= Tokyo Koku Ki-107 =

Japanese trainer aircraft

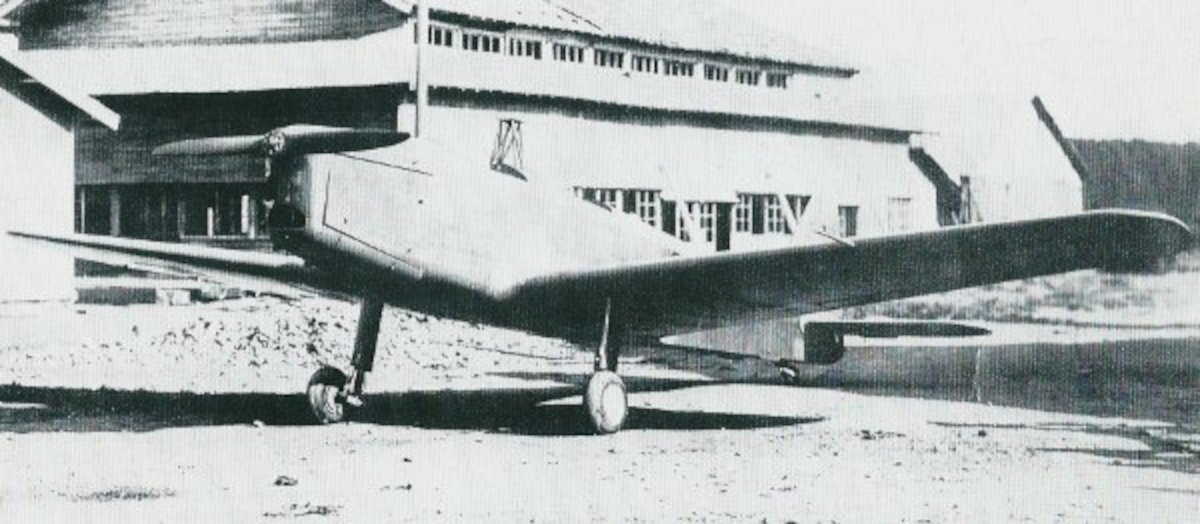

General information
- Type: Monoplane trainer
- National origin: Japan
- Manufacturer: Tokyo Koku
- Primary user: Imperial Japanese Army Air Force
- Number built: 29+

History
- First flight: October 1943

The Tokyo Koku Ki-107 was a Japanese military training aircraft for the Imperial Japanese Army Air Force. The Ki-107 was a wooden-built, low-wing, two-seat monoplane with an open cockpit. Powered by a Hitachi Hatsukaze Ha-47 (Ha-11) inline piston engine, it first flew in October 1943. The Japanese Army had ordered 450, as primary trainers, as replacement for the Kokusai Ki-86 (a license-built Bücker Bü 131 that used the same Ha-47 engine), but production was held up by air raids and only twenty-nine had been delivered by the end of the War.

== Operators ==
Japan

- Imperial Japanese Army Air Force

== Specifications ==
Data from The Illustrated Encyclopedia of Aircraft; Japanese Aircraft of the Pacific War

General characteristics

- Crew: 2 (Teacher and student pilot)
- Length: 8.05 m (26 ft 5 in)
- Wingspan: 10.02 m (32 ft 10.5 in)
- Height: 2.25 m (7 ft 5 in)
- Wing area: 15.44 m^{2} (166.2 sq ft)
- Empty weight: 590 kg (1,301 lb)
- Gross weight: 829 kg (1,828 lb)
- Powerplant: 1 × Hitachi Hatsukaze Ha-47 (Ha-11) (a license-built Hirth HM 504) 4-cylinder inline piston engine, 82 kW (110 hp)

Performance

- Maximum speed: 197 km/h (122 mph, 106 kn)
- Cruise speed: 157 km/h (98 mph, 85 kn)
- Range: 475 km (295 mi, 256 nmi)
- Service ceiling: 2,900 m (9,500 ft)
