= Jeff Cook (golfer) =

American golfer (born 1961)

Personal information
- Full name: Jeff D. Cook
- Nationality: United States
- Born: April 18, 1961 (age 65) Muncie, Indiana, U.S.
- Height: 6 ft 0 in (1.83 m)
- Weight: 175 lb (79 kg; 12.5 st)

Career
- Sport: Golf
- College: Indiana University
- Turned professional: 1987
- Former tours: PGA Tour; Ben Hogan Tour; T. C. Jordan Tour
- Professional wins: 6

Number of wins by tour
- Korn Ferry Tour: 1
- Other: 5

Jeff D. Cook (born April 18, 1961) is an American professional golfer.

== Early life and amateur career ==
Cook was born in Muncie, Indiana. He played college golf at Indiana University.

== Professional career ==
In 1987, he turned professional. Cook played on the PGA Tour and its developmental tour from 1990 to 2000. On the developmental tour, he won the 1990 Ben Hogan Greater Ozarks Open. On the PGA Tour, his best finish was T-17 at the 1993 Anheuser-Busch Golf Classic. He also won the Indiana Open four times between 1986 and 1992.

Cook currently works for Mizuno Golf.

== Professional wins (6) ==
=== Ben Hogan Tour wins (1) ===
No.	Date	Tournament	Winning score	Margin of victory	Runner-up
1	Aug 19, 1990	Ben Hogan Greater Ozarks Open	−9 (69-70-68=207)	Playoff	(United States) Olin Browne

Ben Hogan Tour playoff record (1–0)

No.	Year	Tournament	Opponent	Result
1	1990	Ben Hogan Greater Ozarks Open	(United States) Olin Browne	Won with birdie on first extra hole

=== T. C. Jordan Tour wins (1) ===
No.	Date	Tournament	Winning score	Margin of victory	Runner-up
1	Sep 12, 1993	Heritage Links Classic	−17 (64-70-67-70=271)	Playoff	(Mexico) Javier Sanchez

=== Other wins (4) ===
- 1986 Indiana Open
- 1988 Indiana Open
- 1989 Indiana Open
- 1992 Indiana Open

== See also ==
- 1992 PGA Tour Qualifying School graduates
