= Shinryu =

Shinryū is the Japanese form of Shenlong, the spiritual dragon in Chinese mythology.

Shinryu, Shin-ryu, or Shin Ryu may also refer to:

- Shin Ryu (1619–1680), general of the Joseon Dynasty in Korea
- Kashima Shin-ryū, a martial art
- Mizuno Shinryu, a late-World War II Japanese rocket-powered suicide interceptor concept that was never completed
- Shindō Yōshin-ryū, a traditional school of Japanese martial arts, teaching primarily the art of jūjutsu
- Shin Ryu-jin, contestant of the South Korean survival reality show Mix Nine
- A recurring superboss in the Final Fantasy franchise

== See also ==
- Shienryu
- Kyushin Ryu
