= Ralph Williamson =

Ralph Williamson may refer to:

- Ralph Williamson, captain of the St. Michael of Scarborough
- Ralph Williamson (golfer), see Indiana Open
- Ralph Williamson, in 1731 High Sheriff of Staffordshire
