= Mitsubishi J8M Shūsui =

Japanese rocket-powered interceptor

Mitsubishi Shūsui J8M / Ki-200
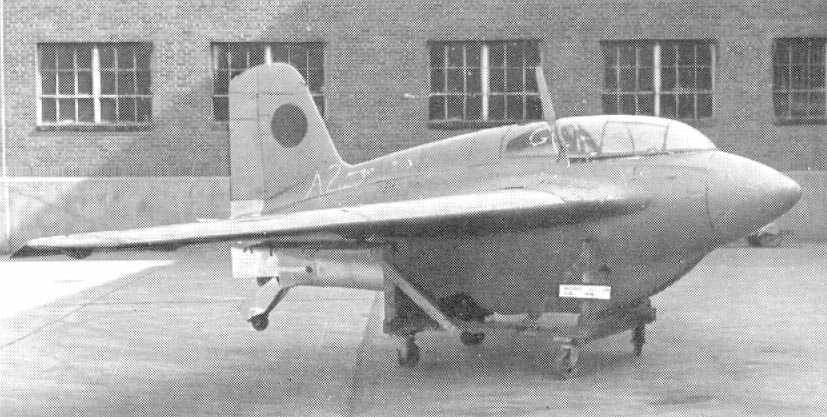
- J8M prototype

General information
- Type: Rocket-powered Interceptor
- Manufacturer: Mitsubishi Aircraft Company
- Primary users: IJA Air Service IJN Air Service
- Number built: 7

History
- Manufactured: 1944–1945
- First flight: 7 July 1945
- Developed from: Messerschmitt Me 163 Komet
- Variants: Yokosuka MXY8; Yokosuka MXY9

The Mitsubishi Shūsui (秋水, Sharp Sword), naval-designation J8M, army-designation Ki-200, is a World War II rocket-powered interceptor aircraft designed and produced by the Japanese aircraft manufacturer Mitsubishi. It is closely based on the German Messerschmitt Me 163 Komet. The name Shūsui literally translates to "Autumn Water", but is used as a poetic term meaning "Sharp Sword" deriving from the swishing sound of a sword.

The J8M was developed as a joint project for both the Imperial Japanese Navy Air Service (JNAF) and the Imperial Japanese Army Air Service (JAAF), which sought to counter the growing threat of Allied strategic bombing of Japan. Originally, the J8M was intended to be a straightforward licence-built copy of the Me 163, however, difficulties in shipping an example and associated materials to Japan led to an effort to reverse engineer the aircraft from a flight operations manual and other limited documentation that had arrived. Starting in 1944, Mitsubishi's design team, headed by the aeronautical engineer Mijiro Takahashi, closely coordinated with the First Naval Air Technical Arsenal to design the airframe. Multiple companies, including Nissan and Fuji, were involved in the manufacturing effort.

During December 1944, an unpowered glider, the Yokosuka MXY8, flew to successfully validate the J8M's handling characteristics. Development was not straightforward, as the JNAF continuously requested design changes while the expedited production schedules overwhelmed some of the manufacturing partners, with readiness for full-scale production not being attained until the final weeks of the war. A single powered prototype was completed and made its maiden flight on 7 July 1945, only weeks prior to the Surrender of Japan that ended the conflict. No operational missions were ever flown. Two examples were transported to the US for evaluation, one of which was preserved and put on public display.

== Design and development ==
The J8M Shūsui can trace its origins back to the German Messerschmitt Me 163 Komet, a rocket-powered interceptor aircraft developed during World War II. The Me 163 had demonstrated impressive capabilities; during late 1941, a prototype had established a new world speed record of 1,004.5 km/h (624.2 mph). Furthermore, by late 1943, Japanese officials had witnessed of the strategic bombing of Germany, and there was a growing suspicion that the Allies' increasingly capable bombers, such as Boeing B-29 Superfortress, would soon be attempting to bomb the Japanese home islands. Recognising that existing piston-engined fighter aircraft, such as the Mitsubishi A6M Zero and Mitsubishi J2M Raiden, would not be sufficiently capable against the looming bomber threat, there was an identified need for a better counter to this upcoming threat and motivated Japan to look towards the latest innovations of the Axis powers.

Japanese military attachés had become aware of the Me 163 following a visit to the Bad Zwischenahn airfield of Erprobungskommando 16, the Luftwaffe evaluation squadron charged with service test of the rocket-propelled interceptor. Japan promptly entered into talks with German for technical assistance in the development of their own rocket interceptor. In late 1943, the two powers had negotiated terms to licence-produce both the Me 163 and its Walter HWK 509A rocket engine. The engine licence alone cost the Japanese 20 million Reichsmarks (equivalent to 81 million 2021 euros). Under the agreement reached, Germany was to provide, by spring 1944, the complete blueprints of the Me 163B and the HWK 509A engine, along with a single complete Me 163, two sets of sub-assemblies and components, and three complete HWK 509A engines. Furthermore, Germany would inform Japan of any improvements and developments of the Me 163, permit the Japanese to study the manufacturing processes for both the Me 163 and its engine and also allow the Japanese to study Luftwaffe operational procedures for the Me 163.

Accordingly, in early 1944, the disassembled aircraft and its engine were dispatched via submarine, destined for Kobe, Japan. It is probable that the airframe was onboard the Japanese submarine RO-501 (ex-U-1224), which left Kiel, Germany on 30 March 1944 and was sunk in the mid-Atlantic on 13 May 1944 by the hunter-killer group based on the escort carrier USS Bogue. Plans and engines were on the Japanese submarine I-29, which left Lorient, France on 16 April 1944 and arrived in Singapore on 14 July 1944, later sunk by the submarine USS Sawfish on 26 July 1944, near the Philippines, after leaving Singapore. Germany is believed to have attempted to send a second Me 163 to Japan onboard U-864, but this submarine was sunk near Bergen by British submarine HMS Venturer in February 1945.

In response to these losses, Japanese officials decided to initiate a reverse engineering effort using a basic instructional manual on the Me 163 in the hands of naval mission member Commander Eiichi Iwaya, who had travelled to Singapore in the I-29 and flown on to Japan when the submarine docked. From its inception, the project was a joint venture between the Imperial Japanese Army Air Service (JAAF) and the Imperial Japanese Navy Air Service (JNAF), in accordance with the Army-Navy Aeronautical Technology Committee accord of August 1943, which stipulated that the services would collaborate in the development of advanced aeronautical weapons. While the JAAF were responsible for the development of the liquid-fuelled rocket engine, the JNAF were to oversee the production of the airframe; the JNAF also initiated work on an alternative turbojet powerplant.

Early on, there were some disagreements between the services however; while the JAAF wanted a new design to be drawn up as it judged there to be little difference in workload for a clean-sheet design, the JNAF preferred the design to be an accurate reproduction of the German Me 163 because it had already proven to be a stable aerodynamic body. It was the JNAF's position that emerged victorious, leading to the issuing of the 19-shi specification in July 1944 for the design of the rocket-powered defence fighter. Shortly thereafter, the contract was awarded to Mitsubishi Jukogyo KK, upon which point the company became responsible for both design and production of the aircraft; the project was headed by the aeronautical engineer Mijiro Takahashi. Takahashi worked in close coordination with the First Naval Air Technical Arsenal. Mitsubishi worked on the development of both the JNAF version (the J8M1 Shūsui) and the JAAF version (Ki-200).

The JAAF decided to undertake their own design to meet the 19-shi specifications, working at their Rikugun Kokugijitsu Kenkyujo (JAAF Aerotechnical Institute) in secret. At the First Naval Air Technical Arsenal in Yokosuka, in association with Mitsubishi and Yokosuka Arsenal, work began to adapt the Walter HWK 509A engine to conform with Japanese manufacturing capabilities and techniques. Work to develop the airframe, undertaken by Mitsubishi together with partner companies Nissan and Fuji, initially proceeded at a rapid pace. Furthermore by this stage, efforts were under way to produce a glider version of the J8M to provide handling data. While working on this glider, the MXY8 Akigusa (秋草, autumn grass), Mitsubishi completed a mock-up of the J8M1 in September 1944.

Both the JAAF and JNAF approved its design and construction, and the construction of a prototype immediately commenced. However, manufacturers allegedly struggled to keep pace with the expedited production schedules (the J8M was set to attain quantity production in a third of the time that Japanese aircraft projects of the era typically would have); production work was also negatively impacted by Allied air raids on Nagoya. Both personnel and resources were in short supply, while efforts to relocate production away for Japan's major cities also impacted the project. Furthermore, the JNAF continuously added new design features and requested modifications that created additional difficulties at Mitsubishi. According to the aviation author Walter E. Grunden, moral amongst the company's design team was low, and that some engineers had spoken out that it would be more promising and productive to concentrate resources on producing a copy of another advanced German fighter, the jet-powered Messerschmitt Me 262 instead.

In December 1944, the MXY8 prototype was completed and, on 8 December 1944, at the Hyakurigahara Airfield, Lieutenant-Commander Toyohiko Inuzuka took the controls of the MXY8. Once in the air, Inuzuka found the MXY8 almost perfectly emulated the handling characteristics of the Me 163. Two additional MXY8 gliders were constructed in the naval yard at Yokosuka, and one was delivered to the Rikugun Kokugijitsu Kenkyujo (JAAF Aerotechnical Institute) at Tachikawa for evaluation. The JNAF initiated the construction of another prototype, which was given the production designation Ku-13; it was to use water ballast to simulate the weight of an operational J8M, complete with engine and weapons. This variant was to be built by Maeda Aircraft Institute, while the JAAF version was to be constructed by Yokoi Koku KK (Yoki Aircraft Co). The JNAF also proposed a more advanced trainer, designated the MXY9 Shūka (秋花, autumn flower), which would be powered by a 2 kN (450 lb_{f}) thrust Tsu-11 ducted-fan engine. However, the conflict ended before this model could be built.

The Japanese succeeded in producing prototypes that outwardly looked very much similar to the Me 163. The J8M1 had a wet weight that was 400 kg (880 lb) lighter, the aircraft having a plywood main spar and wooden vertical tail. The designers had also dispensed with the armoured glass in the cockpit, and the aircraft carried less ammunition and slightly less fuel. The Ki-200 and the J8M1 differed only in minor items, but the most obvious difference was the JAAF's Ki-200 was armed with a pair of 30 mm (1.18 in) Type 5 cannon (with a rate of fire of 450 rounds per minute and a muzzle velocity of 920 m/s (3,000 ft/s)), while the J8M1 was armed with two 30 mm (1.18 in) Ho-105 cannon (rate of fire 400 rounds per minute, muzzle velocity 750 m/s (2,500 ft/s). The Ho-105 was the lighter of the two and both offered a higher velocity than the MK 108 cannon of the Me 163 (whose muzzle velocity was 520 m/s (1,700 ft/s). The Toko Ro.2 (KR10) rocket motor did not produce the same thrust rating as the original, and Mitsubishi calculated that the lighter weight of the J8M1 would not offset this. Performance would not be as good as that of the Me 163, but was still substantial.

The engine used the German propellants of T-Stoff oxidizer and C-Stoff fuel (hydrogen peroxide/methanol-hydrazine), known in Japan as "A" (kō) and "B" (otsu) respectively.

Sixty training versions (Ku-13, Ki-13, MXY-8 & MXY-9) were produced by Yokosuka, Yokoi and Maeda. Seven of the operational version (J8M1/Ki-200) were completed by Mitsubishi.

== Operational history ==
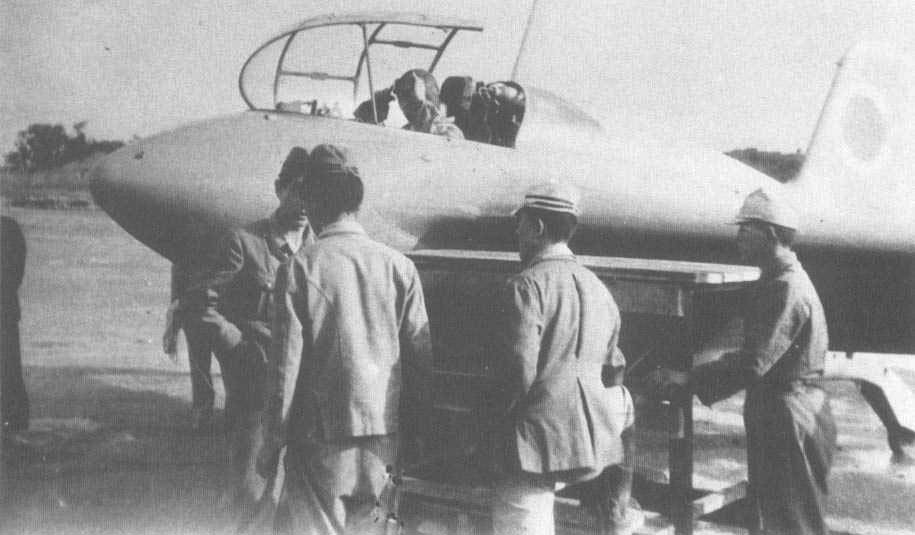
J8M No.17

On 8 January 1945, one of the two J8M1 prototypes was towed aloft, water ballast added in place of the fuel tank and rocket engine to test its aerodynamics. These test flights validated the design's performance. Training courses for JAAF and JNAF pilots began on the Ku-13 glider, which shared a similar configuration to the J8M1. The 312th Naval Air Group was selected to operate the first J8M1. Mitsubishi, Fuji Hikoki, and Nissan Jidosha all had tooling for mass production well into the advanced stages, ready to produce both the J8M1 and the J8M2 variant, which differed from the J8M1 in sacrificing one of the Type 5 cannon for a small increase in fuel capacity. The first J8M1 prototype to be equipped with the Toko Ro.2 (KR10) was ready in June 1945. They were then transferred from the Nagoya plant to Yokoku for final checks before powered flight testing, after final glide tests with the engine installed.

The J8M took to the air for its first powered flight on 7 July 1945, with Lieutenant Commander Toyohiko Inuzuka at the controls; after his "sharp start" rocket-powered takeoff, Inuzuka successfully jettisoned the dolly upon becoming airborne and began to gain speed, climbing skywards at a 45° angle. At an altitude of 400 m (1,300 ft), the engine stopped abruptly, and the J8M1 stalled. Inuzuka managed to glide the aircraft back but clipped a small building at the edge of the airfield while trying to land, causing the aircraft to burst into flames. Inuzuka died the next day. While Mitsubishi and naval technicians sought to find the cause of the accident, all future flights were grounded. According to Grunden, the engine outage had occurred due to a design flaw in the fuel injection system. The steep angle of the climb, coupled with the fuel tanks being half-filled for this first flight, caused a shifting of the fuel, which in turn caused an auto cutout device to activate because of an air lock in the fuel line. Requests to continue flight testing were denied pending the modification of the fuel pumps in the aircraft. The sixth and seventh prototypes were to be fitted with the modified Ro.2 engine.

Contractors were already manufacturing components, and almost ready for full-scale production - although this status would never be attained. Despite another explosion of the fuel mixture during a ground test days after Inuzuka's crash, flight testing was to resume in late August 1945, and the J8M2 design was finalized. However, on 15 August 1945, Japan surrendered, after which all work on the J8M was abruptly terminated. The end of the conflict also spelled the end of the JAAF's Ki-202 Shūsui Kai (Shūsui modified), whose design had begun in secret months before. The Ki-202 was to offer improved flight endurance over the Ki-200 and was slated to be the priority fighter for the JAAF in 1946, but no metal was cut before Japan's surrender.

As with many other Japanese fighter types combating air raids over Japan, the Ki-200 was considered for use in ramming attacks against B-29s. The envisioned mission profile was to make one or two firing passes and then, with the remaining energy, conduct a ramming attack. Any fuel left on board would most likely detonate, increasing the effectiveness of the attack but also meaning the pilot had little chance of survival. Nevertheless, the cost was deemed to be worth it, and plans were being drawn up to form a "Hagakure-Tai" (Special Attack Unit), similar to the German Sonderkommando Elbe, when the war ended.

== Variants ==
J8M – IJAAS-variants:

- Ki-200 Shūsui – Short-range interceptor: 2 × 30 mm Ho-155 or 2× 20 mm Ho-5 autocannons
- Ki-202 Shūsui Kai – Long-range redeveloped version by the Army Aerotechnical Research Institute

J8M – IJNAS-variants:

- J8M1 – Short-range interceptor: 2 × 30 mm Type 5 autocannons
- J8M2 Shūsui Model 21(?) – Long-range interceptor: 1 × 30 mm Type 5 autocannon (second cannon omitted for more fuel)
- J8M3 Shūsui Model 22 – Long-range version, with fuselage and wingspan lengthened to 7.10 m (23 ft 3 in) and 9.75 m (32 ft 0 in) respectively. Powered by 19.6 kN (4,410 lbf) Tokuro-3, projected maximum speed 900 km/h (560 mph). None built

Trainers:

- MXY8 Akigusa – (Yokoi Ku-13):Training glider using J8M airframe for Navy and Army.
- MXY9 Shūka – Training version using J8M airframe, powered by Tsu-11 thermojet engine. None built.

== Operators ==
Japan

- Imperial Japanese Army Air Service
- Imperial Japanese Navy Air Service

== Survivors ==
In November 1945, two aircraft were taken from Yokosuka to the United States for evaluation aboard USS Barnes. FE-300/T2-300 (USA ident) (Japanese ident 403) is now exhibited at the Planes of Fame Museum in Chino, California.

The other was at NAS Glenview in October 1946 (identity unknown), but was scrapped.

In the 1960s, a nearly complete (but badly damaged) fuselage was discovered in a cave in Japan. This was on display at a Japanese Air Self Defense Force base near Gifu until 1999, when it was restored and completed by Mitsubishi for display in the company's internal Komaki Plant Museum.

=== Gallery ===
A Mitsubishi J8M1 Shūsui, at the Planes of Fame Museum, Chino, California, US:

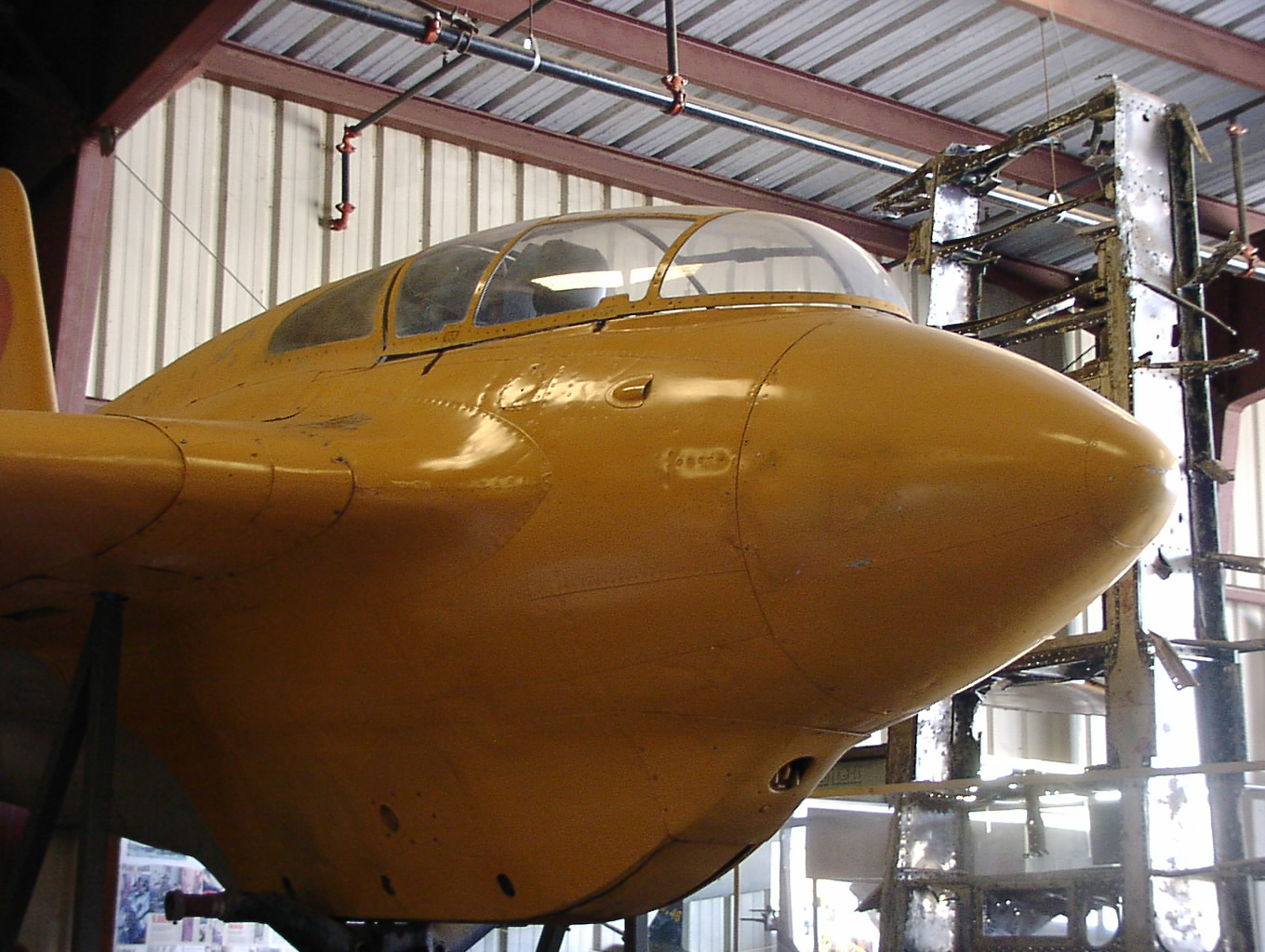

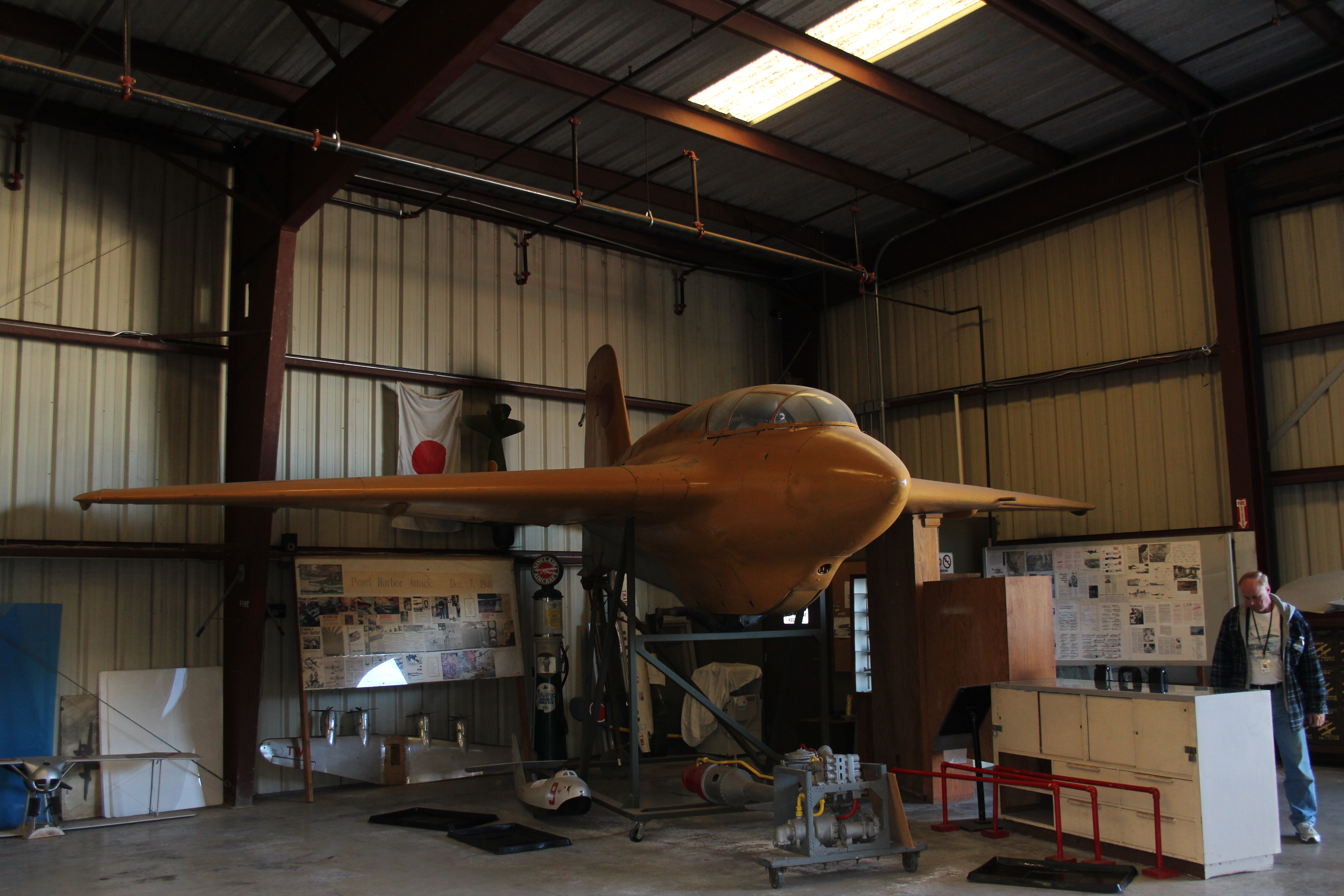

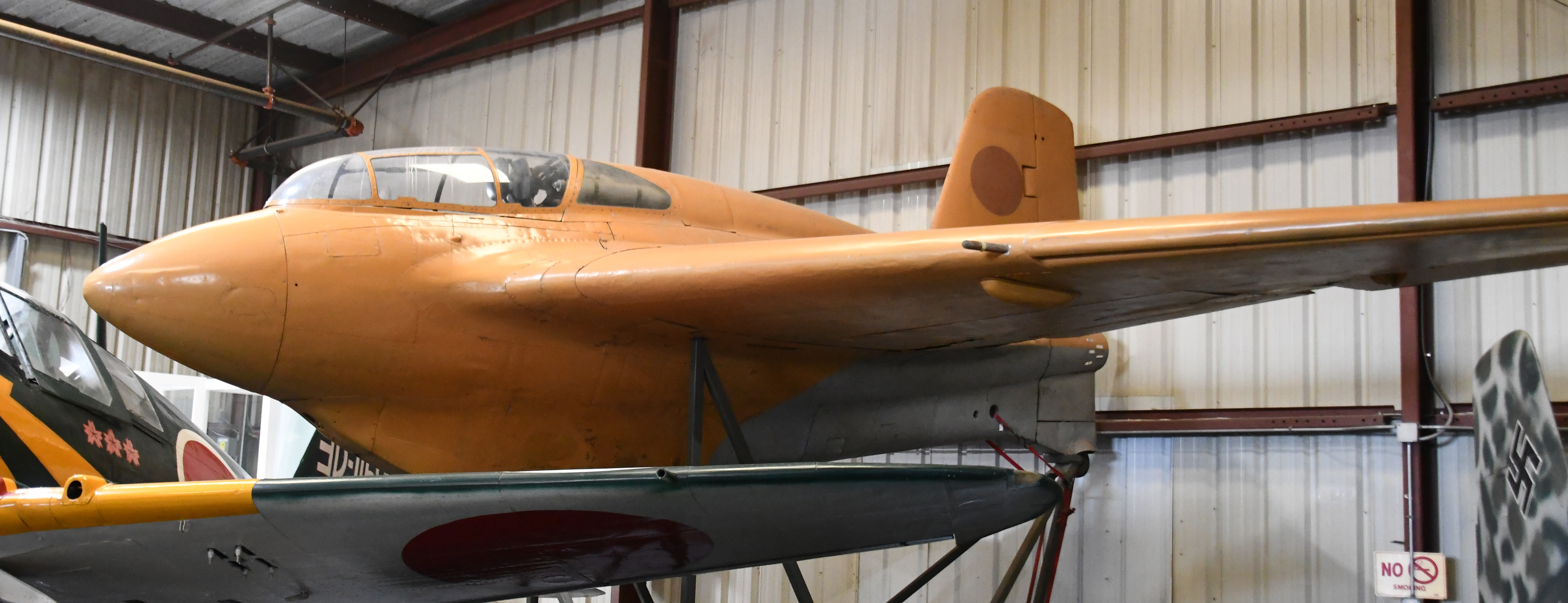

== Comparative Specifications ==
Specifications
	J8M1	J8M2	Ki-200
Manufacturer:	Mitsubishi Jukogyo K.K		
Type:	Interceptor		
Crew:	1		
Span:	9.50 m (31 ft)		9.47 m (31 ft)
Length:	6.03 m (20 ft)		5.88 m (19 ft)
Height:	2.68 m (9 ft)		2.68 m (9 ft)
Wing area:	17.72 m^{2} (191 sq ft)		17.69 m^{2} (190 sq ft)
Wing loading:	219.22 kg/m^{2} (44.9 lb/ft^{2})	219.70 kg/m^{2} (45 lb/ft^{2})	
Empty weight:	1,445 kg (3,186 lb)	1,510 kg (3,329 lb)	1,505 kg (3,318 lb)
Loaded:	3,000 kg (6,614 lb)	3,650 kg (8,047 lb)	
Maximum:	3,870 kg (8,532 lb)	3,900 kg (8,598 lb)	3,870 kg (8,532 lb)
Useful load:	1,545 kg (3,406 lb)	2,140 kg (4,718 lb)	
Fuel capacity:	T-Stoff = 1,181 L (260 imp gal); C-Stoff = 522 L (115 imp gal)		
Armament
Gun:	2 × Type 5 30 mm autocannon	1 × Type 5 30 mm autocannon	2 × Ho-155 30 mm autocannon or 2 × Ho-5 20 mm autocannon
Capacity:	53 rounds per gun		
Performance
Powerplant:	One Toku-Ro.2 (KR10) bipropellant rocket engine developing 1,500 kg (3,307 lb) of thrust		
Liquid-propellant:	T-Stoff = 80% hydrogen peroxide + 20% water with oxyquinoline and pyrophosphates C-Stoff = 30% hydrazine hydrate + 70% methanol, water and potassium cyanocuprate catalyst		
Max speed:	900 km/h (559 mph) at 10,000 m (32,808 ft)		
Cruise speed:	699 km/h (434 mph)		351 km/h (218 mph)
Landing speed:	150 km/h (93 mph)		
Range:	three minutes and six seconds of powered flight		two minutes and 30 seconds of powered flight
Max range:	five minutes and 30 seconds of powered flight		seven minutes of powered flight
Climb:	2,000 m (6,562 ft) in 40 seconds 4,000 m (13,123 ft) in two minutes and eight seconds 8,000 m (26,247 ft) in three minutes and eight seconds 10,000 m (32,808 ft) in three minutes and 50 seconds		10,000 m (32,808 ft) in three minutes and 40 seconds
Rate of climb:	43.47 m/s (8,557 ft/min)		45.45 m/s (8,947 ft/min)
Ceiling:	12,000 m (39,370 ft)		

== See also ==
Related development

- Messerschmitt Me 163
- Rikugun Ki-202
- Mizuno Shinryu
- Yokosuka MXY8
- Yokosuka MXY9

Related lists

- List of military aircraft of Japan
- List of fighter aircraft
- List of rocket aircraft
