= Rikugun Ki-202 =

Japanese rocket-powered interceptor project

Ki-202 Shūsui Kai

General information
- Type: Rocket-powered interceptor aircraft
- Manufacturer: Rikugun Kokugijitsu Kenkyujo
- Status: Cancelled
- Primary user: Imperial Japanese Army Air Force
- Number built: 0

History
- Developed from: Messerschmitt Me 163

The Rikugun Ki-202 Shūsui Kai (秋水改, Sharp Sword improved) was a direct development of the German Messerschmitt Me 163 Komet rocket-powered interceptor aircraft. None were produced before Japan's surrender that ended World War II.

In a split from the development of the Mitsubishi J8M/Ki-200 Shūsui, the IJA instructed Rikugun to develop a new design based on the Me 163, independent of the IJN's J8M. A fundamental shortcoming of the Me 163, and all other aircraft based on it, was extremely limited endurance, typically only a few minutes. The Imperial Japanese Navy proposed to improve the endurance of the J8M1 by producing a version with only one cannon, thereby saving weight and space for more fuel (the J8M2). The Army on the other hand opted to keep both cannons and enlarge the airframe to accommodate larger tanks, resulting in the Ki-202, which was to have been the definitive Army version of the fighter. Power was to be supplied by a 2,000 kg (4,409 lb) thrust Mitsubishi Toku Ro.3 (KR20) rocket motor. Undercarriage was to have been a sprung skid and tail-wheel.

== Specifications (Ki-202 estimated) ==
Data from Japanese Secret Projects:Experimental aircraft of the IJA and IJN 1939–1945

General characteristics

- Crew: 1
- Length: 7.68 m (25 ft 2 in)
- Wingspan: 9.72 m (31 ft 11 in)
- Height: 2.74 m (9 ft 0 in)
- Wing area: 18.39 m^{2} (197.9 sq ft)
- Empty weight: 1,619 kg (3,569 lb)
- Gross weight: 3,384 kg (7,460 lb)
- Max takeoff weight: 5,015 kg (11,056 lb)
- Powerplant: 1 × Mitsubishi Toku Ro.3 liquid-fuelled rocket motor, 19.61 kN (4,409 lbf) thrust

Performance

- Maximum speed: 900 km/h (560 mph, 490 kn) at 10,000 m (33,000 ft)
- Landing speed: 132 km/h (82 mph)
- Endurance: 10 minutes 28 seconds
- Service ceiling: 12,000 m (39,000 ft)
- Rate of climb: 12.346 m/s (2,430 ft/min) initial
- Time to altitude:
  - 2,000 m (6,600 ft) in 1 minute 21 seconds
  - 4,000 m (13,000 ft) in 2 minutes
  - 6,000 m (20,000 ft) in 2 minute 34 seconds
  - 8,000 m (26,000 ft) in 3 minute 2 seconds
  - 10,000 m (33,000 ft) in 3 minute 26 seconds
- Wing loading: 272.43 kg/m^{2} (55.80 lb/sq ft)

Armament

- Guns: 2 × 30 mm (1.18 in) Ho 155-II autocannon

== See also ==
Related development

- Messerschmitt Me 163 Komet
- Mitsubishi J8M
- Yokosuka MXY9

Related lists

- List of fighter aircraft
- List of military aircraft of Japan

== Bibliography ==
- Dyer, Edwin M. III (2009). Japanese Secret Projects:Experimental aircraft of the IJA and IJN 1939–1945 (1st ed.). Hinkley: Midland publishing. pp. 40–42. ISBN 978-1-85780-317-4.
