= Indiana PGA Championship =

Golf tournament in Indiana

The Indiana PGA Championship is a golf tournament that is the championship of the Indiana section of the PGA of America. Although the Indiana section was chartered in 1924, there were no section championships held until 1936. Todd Smith, member of the Indiana Golf Hall of Fame, holds the record with six victories. PGA Tour winners who also won this tournament include Bob Mann, who partnered with Wayne Levi to win the 1978 Walt Disney World National Team Championship, and Bob Hamilton, who won the PGA Championship in 1944, and Chris Smith, who won the 2002 Buick Classic.

== Winners ==
- 2026 Timothy Wiseman
- 2025 Timothy Wiseman
- 2024 Sabrina Bonanno
- 2023 Timothy Wiseman
- 2022 Timothy Wiseman
- 2021 Michael Asbell
- 2020 Chris Smith
- 2019 Michael Asbell
- 2018 Brad Fellers
- 2017 Craig Bowden
- 2016 Brett Melton
- 2015 Craig Bowden
- 2014 John DalCorobbo
- 2013 Jeff March
- 2012 John DalCorobbo
- 2011 John DalCorobbo
- 2010 David Carich
- 2009 Todd Smith
- 2008 Jim Ousley
- 2007 John DalCorrobo
- 2006 Quinn Griffing
- 2005 Alan Schulte
- 2004 Brad Fellers
- 2003 Scott Pieri
- 2002 Brad Fellers
- 2001 Todd Smith
- 2000 Alan Schulte
- 1999 Todd Smith
- 1998 Denny Hepler
- 1997 Todd Smith
- 1996 Todd Smith
- 1995 Gary Sowinski
- 1994 Todd Smith
- 1993 Denny Hepler
- 1992 Greg Havill
- 1991 Scott Steger
- 1990 Cary Hungate
- 1989 Scott Steger
- 1988 Cary Hungate
- 1987 Cary Hungate
- 1986 Bill Shumaker
- 1985 Cary Hungate
- 1984 Bill Shumaker
- 1983 Bill Mattingly
- 1982 Bob Mann
- 1981 Bob Mann
- 1980 Mal McMullen
- 1979 Don Padgett II
- 1978 Geoff Hensley
- 1977 Bill Shumaker
- 1976 Jim Barber
- 1975 Don Padgett II
- 1974 Bob Placido
- 1973 George Thomas
- 1972 Bill Miller, Sr.
- 1971 Don Essig III
- 1970 Sam Carmichael
- 1969 Arnold Koehler
- 1968 Alan White
- 1967 Ed Knych
- 1966 Jim Guinnup
- 1965 Ed Knych
- 1964 Ed Knych
- 1963 Ed Knych
- 1962 Charlie Harter
- 1961 William Heinlein
- 1960 Don Street
- 1959 Jim Guinnup
- 1958 Jim Guinnup
- 1957 Charlie Harter
- 1956 Jimmy Scott
- 1955 Jim Guinnup
- 1954 William Heinlein
- 1953 Wayne Timberman
- 1952 Mike DeMassey
- 1951 Todd Houck
- 1950 Charlie Harter
- 1949 Charlie Harter
- 1948 William Heinlein
- 1947 Wayne Timberman
- 1946 William Heinlein
- 1945 William Heinlein
- 1944 Bob Hamilton
- 1943 Bob Hamilton
- 1942 Wayne Timberman
- 1941 Bud Williamson
- 1940 Russell Stonehouse
- 1939 John Watson
- 1938 Bud Williamson
- 1937 Ralph Stonehouse
- 1936 Bud Williamson
