= Craig Bowden =

American professional golfer (born 1968)

Personal information
- Full name: Craig David Bowden
- Nationality: United States
- Born: June 18, 1968 (age 58) Bedford, Indiana, U.S.
- Height: 5 ft 9 in (1.75 m)
- Weight: 170 lb (77 kg; 12 st)
- Spouse: Tisa Bowden
- Children: 2

Career
- Sport: Golf
- College: University of Indianapolis
- Turned professional: 1989
- Former tours: PGA Tour; Web.com Tour; Hooters Tour
- Professional wins: 14

Number of wins by tour
- Korn Ferry Tour: 3
- Other: 11

Best results in major championships
- Masters Tournament: DNP
- PGA Championship: CUT: 2018, 2019
- U.S. Open: T50: 2002
- The Open Championship: DNP

Craig David Bowden (born June 18, 1968) is an American professional golfer who has played on the PGA Tour and the Web.com Tour.

== Early life and amateur career ==
Bowden played college golf at the University of Indianapolis.

== Professional career ==
Bowden has gone back and forth between the PGA Tour and its developmental tour during his career. He was a member of PGA Tour in 1997, 2000–01, 2004, 2007, and 2010 and its developmental tour in 1993, 1996, 1998–1999, 2002, 2003, 2005–06, 2008–09, and 2011–12. He has won three tournaments on the developmental tour and three on the NGA Hooters Tour. At the end of the 2016 season, he ranked 15th on the career Nationwide Tour money list.

Bowden's last full season on the Web.com Tour was 2012. On the 2013 Web.com Tour, he played four events and only made one cut at the Brasil Classic, finishing T52. He has not played on the Web.com Tour since 2013 or the PGA Tour since 2010.

Bowden regularly competes in Indiana Golf Association events, winning the Indiana Open in 1994, 1995, and 2014 and the Indiana PGA Championship in 2015. He finished second in the 2016 Indiana PGA Championship.

== Professional wins (14) ==
=== Nationwide Tour wins (3) ===
No.	Date	Tournament	Winning score	Margin of victory	Runner(s)-up
1	Jun 7, 1998	Nike Miami Valley Open	−16 (65-64-68-67=264)	2 strokes	(United States) Doug Dunakey, (United States) Ryan Howison
2	Oct 26, 2003	Miccosukee Championship	−14 (69-65-65-71=270)	1 stroke	(United States) Chris Couch
3	Aug 20, 2006	Northeast Pennsylvania Classic	−16 (69-69-67-63=268)	Playoff	(United States) Jess Daley

Nationwide Tour playoff record (1–0)

No.	Year	Tournament	Opponent	Result
1	2006	Northeast Pennsylvania Classic	(United States) Jess Daley	Won with par on first extra hole

=== Hooters Tour wins (3) ===
No.	Date	Tournament	Winning score	Margin of victory	Runner(s)-up
1	Aug 23, 1992	Tour Championship	−9 (68-70-69-68=275)	3 strokes	(United States) Chris Berens, (United States) Marion Dantzler
2	Sep 19, 1993	Fox 30 Golf Classic	−9 (66-70-74-69=279)	2 strokes	(United States) Paul Claxton
3	Oct 1, 1995	Gainesville Classic	−18 (65-68-69-68=270)	Playoff	(United States) Tom Gillis

=== Other wins (8) ===
- 1994 Indiana Open
- 1995 Indiana Open
- 2014 Indiana Open
- 2015 Indiana PGA Championship
- 2017 Indiana PGA Championship
- 2019 Indiana PGA Senior Championship
- 2022 Indiana Senior Open, Indiana PGA Senior Championship

== Results in major championships ==
Tournament	1999	2000	2001	2002	2003	2004	2005	2006	2007	2008	2009
Masters Tournament											
U.S. Open	CUT			T50	CUT	CUT					CUT
The Open Championship											
PGA Championship											

Tournament	2010	2011	2012	2013	2014	2015	2016	2017	2018
Masters Tournament									
U.S. Open									
The Open Championship									
PGA Championship									CUT

Tournament	2019
Masters Tournament	
PGA Championship	CUT
U.S. Open	
The Open Championship	

Did not play

CUT = missed the half-way cut
"T" = tied

== See also ==
- 1996 PGA Tour Qualifying School graduates
- 1999 PGA Tour Qualifying School graduates
- 2003 Nationwide Tour graduates
- 2006 Nationwide Tour graduates
- 2009 Nationwide Tour graduates
