= Yokosuka MXY8 Akigusa =

Japanese training glider

MXY8 Akigusa
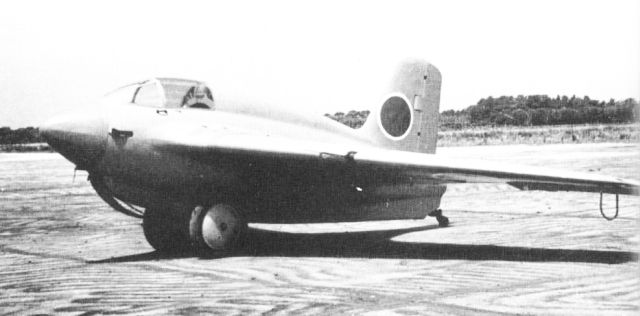

General information
- Type: Training Glider
- National origin: Japan
- Manufacturer: Yokosuka Naval Air Technical Arsenal

History
- Variant: Yokosuka MXY9

The Yokosuka MXY8 Akigusa (秋草, autumn grass) was a training glider built in parallel with the Mitsubishi J8M/K-200 Shūsui rocket-powered interceptor aircraft.

== Design and development ==
The J8M was to have simply been a licence-built Messerschmitt Me 163 Komet, but, due to difficulties in obtaining technical materials from Germany, it eventually had to be designed almost from scratch. The MXY8 was designed in parallel with the J8M to validate the design and then to provide pilot training during the development of the actual interceptor. The Army designation for the type was Ku-13.

The MXY8 was built entirely of wood and fitted with ballast tanks that would be filled with water to simulate the weight and, therefore, flight characteristics of a fully equipped J8M. Some 50-60 of these gliders were eventually built.

A more advanced trainer, the MXY9, equipped with a primitive jet engine was planned but was never produced.

Many sources apply the designation MXY8 to the Yokosuka MXY7 Ohka kamikaze weapon.

== Specifications ==
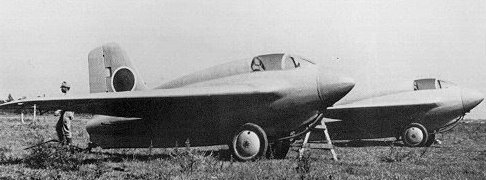
Yokosuka MXY8 Akigusa unmotorized training glider version of the Mitsubishi J8M1 Shūsui

Data from Japanese Aircraft of the Pacific War

General characteristics

- Crew: 1
- Length: 6.05 m (19 ft 10 in)
- Wingspan: 9.5 m (31 ft 2 in)
- Height: 2.7 m (8 ft 10 in)
- Wing area: 17.73 m^{2} (190.8 sq ft)

Performance

== See also ==
Related development

- Messerschmitt Me 163
- Mitsubishi J8M
- Yokosuka MXY9
