= Bob Mann (golfer) =

American professional golfer (born 1951)

Personal information
- Full name: Robert Mann
- Nationality: United States
- Born: November 22, 1951 (age 74) Milwaukee, Wisconsin, U.S.
- Height: 6 ft 0 in (1.83 m)
- Weight: 175 lb (79 kg; 12.5 st)

Career
- Sport: Golf
- College: Indiana University
- Turned professional: 1974
- Former tours: PGA Tour; Champions Tour
- Professional wins: 4

Number of wins by tour
- PGA Tour: 1
- Other: 3

Best results in major championships
- Masters Tournament: DNP
- PGA Championship: T51: 1979
- U.S. Open: CUT: 7 times
- The Open Championship: DNP

Robert Mann (born November 22, 1951) is an American professional golfer. He played on the PGA Tour from 1977 to 1980.

== Early life and amateur career ==
Mann was born in Milwaukee, Wisconsin. He graduated from Whitefish Bay High School in 1970. Mann was the 1969–1970 Wisconsin Junior Amateur Champion.

He earned a scholarship to Indiana University where he was co-captain of the 1973 Big Ten Championship golf team. He majored in marketing and advertising and was graduated with a bachelor's degree.

== Professional career ==
In 1974, Mann began his career as a professional golfer.

As a PGA Tour player, Mann had a handful of top-10 finishes, including a win at the 1978 Walt Disney World National Team Championship with playing partner Wayne Levi. His best finish in a major was tied for 51st place at the 1979 PGA Championship.

After retiring from the PGA Tour, Mann became the head club pro at Valle Vista Country Club in Indianapolis, a position he held for 10 years. Since 1991, he has served as head golf pro at Little Turtle Country Club in Westerville, Ohio, a suburb of Columbus.

== Personal life ==
Mann lives in Columbus, Ohio.

== Awards and honors ==
- Mann won the 1994–1995 Southern Ohio PGA Player of the Year award.
- He also won the 2004 Southern Ohio Senior PGA Player of the Year award.

== Amateur wins ==
- 1969 Wisconsin Junior Amateur
- 1970 Wisconsin Junior Amateur

== Professional wins (4) ==
=== PGA Tour wins (1) ===
No.	Date	Tournament	Winning score	Margin of victory	Runners-up
1	Nov 5, 1978	Walt Disney World National Team Championship (with (United States) Wayne Levi)	−34 (64-65-62-63=254)	3 strokes	(United States) Bobby Wadkins and (United States) Lanny Wadkins

=== Other wins (2) ===
- 1981 Indiana PGA Championship
- 1982 Indiana PGA Championship

=== Senior wins (1) ===
- 2005 Senior Stroke Play Championship
