= Ishikawajima Tsu-11 =

1940s Japanese motorjet aircraft engine

Tsu-11
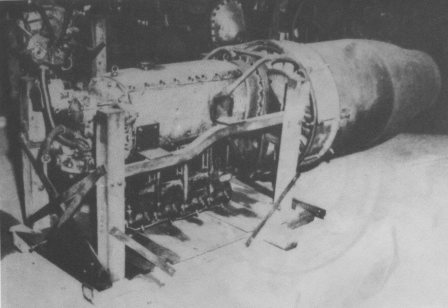
- Type: Motorjet
- National origin: Japan
- Manufacturer: Ishikawajima
- Major applications: Yokosuka MXY7 Ohka; Yokosuka MXY9
- Developed from: Hitachi Hatsukaze

The Ishikawajima Tsu-11 was a motorjet produced in small numbers in Japan in the closing stages of World War II. It was principally designed to propel the Japanese Yokosuka MXY7 Ohka flying bomb, a kamikaze weapon.

== Design and development ==
The Tsu-11 used a four-cylinder inverted inline Hitachi Hatsukaze Toku Model 13 piston engine — a license-built version of the German Hirth HM 504 inverted, inline-four cylinder air-cooled engine, with the "model 13" version indicating its adaptation to drive a single-stage compressor. A fuel injection system was fitted behind the compressor. In operation, fuel would be mixed with the compressed air and the resulting mixture ignited, creating thrust.

The engine was designed to overcome the major shortcoming of the Ohka Type 11 weapons, that of limited range. The Type 11 was powered by solid-fuel rocket motors, which provided tremendous acceleration, but had a very short burn time. The upshot of this was that the Ohka's carrier aircraft would have to fly very close to the target, making it vulnerable to interception. In practice, most Ohka-carrying bombers were shot down before they ever had the opportunity to launch their weapons. It was reasoned that a jet engine would provide high speed as well as enough range to keep the carrier plane safe long enough to release the Ohka and leave the area.

The engine was first tested hung underneath a Yokosuka P1Y bomber sometime in 1944 and was deemed successful enough to order into production. The Ohka was adapted to accommodate the engine in a lengthened fuselage with jet intakes added at the sides. This configuration was designated Ohka Type 22. The Tsu-11 was also selected to power the Yokosuka MXY9 Shuka ("Autumn Fire") - a trainer intended to prepare pilots for the Mitsubishi J8M rocket-powered interceptor. Neither of these aircraft entered service, however, as their development took place too late in the war.

A single example of a Tsu-11 engine exists, preserved at the National Air and Space Museum in Washington, DC. In 1997 it was installed in the museum's Ohka 22 during its restoration. Engineering analysis of the engine during the restoration process suggested that the fuel injection and combustion probably contributed little to the power of the engine, with most of the thrust actually being produced by the compressor.

== Applications ==
- Yokosuka MXY7 Ohka
- Yokosuka MXY9

== See also ==
Related development

- Hirth HM 504
- Hitachi Hatsukaze

Related lists

- List of aircraft engines

== Bibliography ==
- Dyer, Edward M. (2009). Japanese Secret Projects: Experimental Aircraft of the IJA and IJN 1939–1945. Hersham, UK: Midland Publishing. ISBN 978-1-857803-37-2.
- Goodwin, Mike & Starkings, Peter (2017). Japanese Aero-Engines 1910-1945. Sandomierz, Poland: MMPBooks. ISBN 978-83-65281-32-6.
