= Mizuno Shinryū =

Japanese rocket interceptor project

Shinryū
- A diagram showing the Shinryū from several angles.

General information
- Type: Interceptor
- National origin: Empire of Japan
- Manufacturer: Mizuno
- Designer: Yoshio Akita
- Status: Cancelled
- Primary user: IJN Navy Air Service (Intended)
- Number built: 5 "Jinryū" (Note: For the purposes of this text, Shinryū II is used to help differentiate the interceptor from the glider. The kanji and is the same for both spellings but is pronounced differently. Both translations of Jinryū and Shinryū mean "Divine Dragon". Shinryū II is also used in contemporary texts and as such, is used here for recognition purposes. Whether the interceptor would have carried the same name as the glider is unknown.) Glider Prototypes; 0 "Shinryū" (Design Only)

History
- First flight: mid-July 1945 (Jinryū)

The Mizuno Jinryū/Shinryū (神龍, "Divine Dragon") was a late-World War II Japanese rocket-powered interceptor. While the Jinryū was still in development, Mizuno began to develop an interceptor which both the Army and Navy air force were in desperate need of to fend off the Boeing B-29 Superfortress. When Japan surrendered to the Allies on 15 August 1945, all aircraft that were under development were stopped, including the Jinryū & Shinryū II. The Shinryū II was the second aircraft developed in Japan to use a canard design, after the Kyushu J7W Shinden.

== Development ==
In June 1944, the first Boeing B-29 Superfortresses appeared over Japan. It was the start of bombing campaign that would see key Japanese cities, infrastructure and industries reduced to ashes through conventional and firebombing raids. With the aircraft industry being a priority target, the Imperial Japanese Navy Aviation Bureau (海軍航空本部, Kaigun Koku Hombu) looked to ways to combat the B-29 menace. One concept was a point defence interceptor that could quickly rise to meet the bombers and so the Mizuno Shinryū was born. However, the development of the Shinryū began with designs for a far more conventional craft.

In November 1944, the Navy Aviation Bureau looked into the possibilities of an aircraft to undertake suicide missions (神風, shinpu). While the mission was not unique, the fact that the aircraft being investigated would be a glider was. The Bureau envisioned that gliders would be launched with rocket boosters from caves or shore positions and pilots would guide the aircraft and the 100 kg (220 lb) explosive payload inside it into Allied ships or tanks should the Japanese home islands be invaded. The Bureau assigned the Yokosuka Naval Air Technical Arsenal (海軍航空技術廠, Kaigun Kōkū Gijutsu-shō) at Yokosuka the task of turning the glider into reality. The project was led by Shigeki Sakakibara who staffed a number of teams that would each be responsible for one part of the glider. The different sections were the wings, the fuselage, control surfaces, aerodynamic testing and test flights once the prototype was complete. The Navy Aviation Bureau gave instructions that the glider must be built from as much wood as possible.

This restriction was imposed for two reasons. The first was that in using wood and keeping the use of metal to an absolute minimum, the glider could be manufactured in any small shop using only wood working tools, and secondly, as a consequence, what metals were available would be conserved for other military uses. Much of the glider's design was conceived by Yoshio Akita. A number of concepts were discussed and sketched and after much deliberation among Akita and his teams the design was complete by May 1945, and the Mizuno Corporation, a small glider manufacturer better known for sports equipment, had almost finished the prototype.

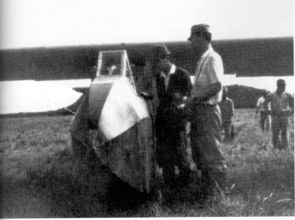
The Jinryu being inspected by Japanese personnel.

The glider was very simple and used a high-wing monoplane form. The straight and flat wings were wide but had a short span and were designed to ensure that the glider was easy to handle given that inexperienced pilots would be at the controls. Also, the platform would be able to accommodate the rocket engines that were to be used to boost the glider into the air. The pilot sat in an open cockpit. The design was sent to the Navy Aviation Bureau for review. Sakakibara studied the plans and projections and after his analysis it was felt the glider was flawed and changes were necessary.

After these had been made the design was approved. Work began on the revised Jinryū, as the glider was now called, by the middle of June 1945. To hasten the construction, the finalised blueprints and work plans for the Jinryū were drawn up even as the components for the first prototype were being built. Construction of the Jinryū was again given to Mizuno. Working around the clock, the company completed two prototypes with such speed that wind tunnel testing of the design was still underway. In fact, the first flight of the Jinryū occurred even before the results of the testing had been provided to Tonsho and Sakakibara. Tashiichi Narabayashi was the pilot who flew the maiden flight in mid-July 1945 at the airfield in Ishioka, a city located in Ibaraki Prefecture, about 90 km (56 mi) northeast of Tokyo. The Jinryū was towed into the air by a Tachikawa Ki-9, piloted by Saburo Fujikura, a man known for his skill in flying gliders prior to the beginning of the war.

For the first test, Narabayashi assessed the Jinryū's handling. On landing, his opinion was that the glider was stable and possessed good handling characteristics. For the second flight Narabayashi would investigate the Jinryū's diving capability and after a few bounces on the ground the Ki-9 and the Jinryū took off. At a height of 2,300 m (7,500 ft), Narabayashi went to cast off from the Ki-9 but found that the tow rope release had stuck; however, he was able to cut the rope and proceed with the test flight. When Narabayashi put the Jinryū into a dive and had reached 300 km/h (190 mph), the glider began to vibrate to such a degree that he was unable to read the gauges. Pulling the nose up to bleed off speed, Narabayashi discovered that the vibrations ceased. During his descent Narabayashi examined the vibrations and after landing the issue was reviewed. The conclusion was that the tail was not sufficiently reinforced and the vertical stabiliser was too small.

The Jinryū was modified by adding some strengthening in the tail and fitting a second stabiliser. The changes were later validated both in the air and in the wind tunnel testing of the modified Jinryū model. Before flying the Jinryū, Narabayashi had suspected that the aircraft would have stability problems, which proved to be the case. With the handling and flight characteristics of the Jinryū proven, the testing moved to the next phase - that of-powered flight. The glider was relocated to an airfield in Kasumigaura, about 19 km (12 mi) north of Ishioka. Here, the Jinryū was modified to accept a group of three Toku-Ro I Type I rocket engines that together would produce 300 kg (660 lb) of thrust during a 10-second burn.

Testing of the rocket array showed two serious flaws. The first was the quality of the rockets that resulted in a number of failures. The second was the inconsistency of the burn times. Narabayashi noted his concerns and forwarded them to Major Suganuma who had been placed in charge of the Jinryū project. In addition to expressing his doubts about the rocket engines, he also stated that the Jinryū would be unsuited for shinpu missions because, despite the changes made to the glider to improve the flight characteristics, it was a challenging aircraft to fly. Narabayashi suggested that instead of being used for shinpu operations, the glider should be modified to take six rocket engines each with a 30-second burn time. He estimated that at maximum burn the Jinryū could attain a speed of 750 km/h (470 mph), and for weapons he envisioned that it could carry ten explosive charges adapted from artillery shells used by the IJA in their 100 mm (3.9 in) guns (likely the Type 92). Not only did Narabayashi agree that the Jinryū could be used against tanks and ships but added that it could also be used to attack US B-29 bombers.

Despite the issues with the rockets work continued on preparing the Jinryū for powered flight. Major Suganuma, however, would become the catalyst for the Shinryū II's continued development. Taking Narabayashi's concerns on board, Suganuma formed a team to revise the Jinryū and produce a design for an interceptor rather than a glider; Suganuma was especially interested in this idea since he had access to rocket engines that promised 32-second burn times. Two people were retained from the Jinryū project: Sakakibara, the lead designer, and Yoshio Tonsho who would oversee the construction of the prototype. Yujiro Murakami was tasked with the aerodynamic testing of the Shinryū II. All of those assigned to develop the Shinryū II were ordered by Suganuma to maintain the utmost secrecy. Unlike the Jinryū, the Shinryū II was to be built from the outset as an interceptor. Sakakibara would use a canard design that made this the second Japanese aircraft to be developed during the war with such a feature (the first was the Kyushu J7W Shinden). In addition, the main wings had a platform similar to a cropped delta. These design features were included as a means of ensuring stability in flight as well as good handling characteristics. Since the average Japanese pilot had little experience with canard equipped aircraft, the Shinryū II had spoilers fitted into the top of each main wing. Each spoiler was able to rotate between 60 degrees and 90 degrees and if the mechanism for controlling the spoilers was damaged, they would automatically return to the closed position. The pilot was provided with an enclosed cockpit. For power, the Shinryū II was to use four Toku-Ro I Type 2 rocket engines located in the rear of the fuselage. Each engine provided a 30-second burn time and all together up to 600 kg (1,300 lb) of thrust could be delivered. Two rockets would be used to get the Shinryū II airborne while the other two engines would be used when making the attack. There was a concern regarding the operating temperatures of the Toku Ro rockets and two methods of cooling the engines were considered. The first would have utilised an air-cooled combustion chamber that would have required an air inlet using a bayonet mechanism in order to maintain air flow across the chamber. It also would have required specific positioning of the fuel injectors so as not to have the air flow disrupt the injection process. The second method would use injectors which sprayed a water and alcohol mixture onto the rocket nozzle, cooling it.

In reviewing the two solutions for cooling, it was determined that the water/alcohol system would be the simplest to implement. No provision was made for a wheeled landing gear system and skids were used. A nose skid was provided with a basic spring suspension to absorb the landing forces. Under each wing was a non-sprung skid arrangement supported by two struts. For take-off the Shinryū II was to use a two wheeled dolly similar to the one used by the Mitsubishi J8M Shūsui . Once airborne the pilot could jettison the dolly. In addition to conventional runway take-off procedures, other methods for launching the Shinryū II were considered but what exactly these were is not known. It can be speculated that towing the Shinryū II aloft was one consideration. Another may have been air dropping the Shinryū II in the same manner as the Kūgishō MXY7 Ōka. In both cases this may have preserved two of the rocket engines which would have been used up had the Shinryū II taken off from the ground. In order to combat the B-29, which could operate at altitudes up to 10,000 m (33,000 ft), the Shinryū II was to be equipped with a pressurised cockpit or, if such a cockpit proved problematic, the pilot would wear a pressure suit.

For weapons, the Shinryū II was to be armed with eight rockets. Attached to the inside of the rear landing skid arrangement were four tubes, one on top of the other and angled downwards, which contained the rockets. There has been some conjecture as to the mission objective of the Shinryū II. Some sources make the case that the Shinryū II was to be used like the MXY7 while others come to the conclusion that the Shinryū II was to attack armoured ground targets such as tanks. In both cases these sources state that the nose of the Shinryū II contained an impact fused explosive warhead and once the rocket armament was expended, the pilot would crash the aircraft into his final target using the warhead to deliver the coup de grâce. However, analysis of the Shinryū II shows that neither mission was likely. The aircraft would have been far more complex to build than the Toka or Ōka and the Shinryū II was constructed for maneuverability, high altitude operation and the means to land. In addition, using the Shinryū II for shinpu missions against tanks makes little sense when there were other simpler and more effective means (both already in service and under development) to eliminate armour.

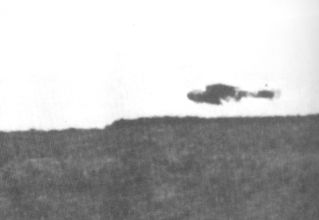
Mizuno Jinryū during landing

Perhaps this is a case of the Jinryū glider's role being applied to the Shinryū II, or an assumption based on the fact that, like the IJN's other special attack aircraft such as the Kikka, Baika and Toka, the Shinryū II possessed no letter/numerical designation. So, by extension, the Shinryū II must also have been a special attack weapon. This, of course, is not to say that the pilot could not choose to use the Shinryū II as a shinpu aircraft. As an interceptor, the Shinryū II had a similar role to the Mitsubishi J8M Shūsui and the German Bachem Ba 349 Natter, which the Japanese were aware of and obtained data on (although the plans never made it to Japan). Like the J8M and Ba349, and due to the limited range afforded by the rocket engines, the Shinryū II would have to be positioned close to targets that were likely to be bombed. And like the J8M, the Shinryū II would have used a jettisonable wheeled dolly to take-off while firing a pair of its rocket engines. Unlike the J8M which burned up all of its fuel at once, the Shinryū II had a second set of rocket engines which could be used to sustain flight endurance or to increase speed during the attack. In the same way as the Ba349, the Shinryū II would be armed with rocket projectiles, likely fired as a group to affect a spread pattern, to bring down the bomber target. Finally, akin to the J8M, once the fuel and ammunition were expended, the Shinryū II would glide back to its base to be recovered, refueled and rearmed.

The Shinryū II would never be built because the end of the hostilities in August 1945 terminated any further work on the design. Likewise, the Jinryū glider would never fly under power. After the failure of the rocket motors during ground tests, the war came to a close before more suitable and reliable motors could be acquired and tested. Mizuno completed a total of five Jinryū gliders.

== Variants ==
Jinryū
Special attack aircraft. Mizuno's only (known) plane to be ordered into production. 5 glider prototypes produced.
Shinryū II
Rocket Interceptor with 4 rocket pods stacked on each other under each wing. Designed to intercept the B-29 Superfortress in a similar fashion to the Bachem Ba 349. None built.

== Operators ==
Japan

- Imperial Japanese Navy Air Service

== Specifications ==
Data from Japanese Secret Projects: Experimental aircraft of the IJA and IJN 1939-1945

General characteristics

- Crew: 1
- Length: 7.6 m (24 ft 11 in)
- Wingspan: 7 m (23 ft 0 in)
- Height: 1.8 m (5 ft 11 in)
- Wing area: 11 m^{2} (120 sq ft)
- Powerplant: 4 × Toku-Ro I Type II solid-fuel rockets, 1.5 kN (340 lbf) thrust each

Performance

- Maximum speed: 300 km/h (190 mph, 160 kn)
- Cruise speed: 110 km/h (68 mph, 59 kn)
- Range: 4.0 km (2.5 mi, 2.2 nmi)
- Service ceiling: 400 m (1,300 ft)

Armament

- Guns: 4 × 30 mm (1.18 in) Type 5 cannons (Although suggested, there is no evidence that supports this).
- Rockets: 8 x unguided rockets
- Bombs: 1 × 100 kg (220 lb) explosive warhead or 10 × explosive charges adapted from 100 mm (3.9 in) artillery gun shells (likely the Type 92)

== See also ==
- Kawanishi K-200
- Kyushu J7W Shinden
- Nakajima Kikka
- Nakajima Ki-201

Related development

- Kawanishi Baika
- Mitsubishi J8M
- Rikugun Ki-202
- Yokosuka MXY-7 Ohka

Aircraft of comparable role, configuration, and era

- Bachem Ba 349 Natter
- Messerschmitt Me 163
- Mitsubishi J8M Shusui

Related lists

- List of fighter aircraft
- List of military aircraft of Japan
- List of rocket aircraft
