= Indiana Open =

The Indiana Open is the Indiana state open golf tournament, open to both amateur and professional golfers. It is organized by the Indiana section of the PGA of America. It has been played annually since 1915 at a variety of courses around the state. The tournament was not played in 1917.

== Winners ==
- 2026 Brayden Miller (a)
- 2025 Nick Bienz
- 2024 Michael Davan
- 2023 Nick Bienz
- 2022 Seth Fair
- 2021 Michael Davan
- 2020 Eric Steger
- 2019 Michael Davan
- 2018 Michael Sharp (a)
- 2017 Brian Maurer
- 2016 Brett Melton
- 2015 Timothy Hildebrand (a)
- 2014 Craig Bowden
- 2013 Seth Fair
- 2012 Stephen Conrad
- 2011 Brian Maurer
- 2010 Chase Wright (a)
- 2009 Aaron Monson (a)
- 2008 Brett Melton
- 2007 Jeff Sanders
- 2006 Alan Schulte
- 2005 Alan Schulte
- 2004 Lee Williamson
- 2003 Jamie Broce
- 2002 Jamie Broce
- 2001 Lee Williamson (a)
- 2000 Todd Smith
- 1999 Soon Ko
- 1998 Dave McCampbell
- 1997 Tony Soerries
- 1996 Tony Soerries
- 1995 Craig Bowden
- 1994 Craig Bowden
- 1993 Todd Smith
- 1992 Jeff Cook
- 1991 Bill Blumenherst
- 1990 Denny Hepler
- 1989 Jeff Cook
- 1988 Jeff Cook
- 1987 Bill Schumaker
- 1986 Jeff Cook
- 1985 Denny Hepler
- 1984 Gary Gant
- 1983 Jim Gallagher Jr.
- 1982 Bill Schumaker
- 1981 Joe Campbell
- 1980 Scott Steger
- 1979 Bob Buinnup
- 1978 Bill Schumaker
- 1977 Joe Campbell
- 1976 Ed Knych
- 1975 Don Padgett II
- 1974 Mal McMullen
- 1973 Wally Armstrong
- 1972 Don Padgett II
- 1971 Ed Knych
- 1970 Billy Kratzert (a)
- 1969 Brent Hartman (a)
- 1968 Ed Knych
- 1967 Randy Quick
- 1966 Bob Hamilton
- 1965 Jim Shaw
- 1964 Don Essig III
- 1963 Ed Knych
- 1962 Sam Carmichael
- 1961 Bill Newcomb
- 1960 Sam Carmichael (a)
- 1959 Dale Morey (a)
- 1958 Bill Heinlein
- 1957 Dale Morey (a)
- 1956 Joe Campbell (a)
- 1955 Joe Campbell (a)
- 1954 Jimmy Scott
- 1953 Dale Morey (a)
- 1952 Mike DeMassey
- 1951 Dale Morey (a)
- 1950 Fred Wampler (a)
- 1949 Jimmy Scott
- 1948 George Shafer
- 1947 Noel Epperson
- 1946 Maurie Feeney
- 1945 George Shafer
- 1944 Bill Heinlein
- 1943 Mike Stefanchik (a)
- 1942 Bob Hamilton
- 1941 Ralph Williamson
- 1940 Wayne Timberman
- 1939 Bill Read, Jr. (a)
- 1938 Bob Hamilton
- 1937 Ralph Williamson
- 1936 Marion Smith
- 1935 Bill Heinlein
- 1934 Bill Heinlein
- 1933 Guy Paulson
- 1932 Neal McIntyre
- 1931 Neal McIntyre
- 1930 John Watson
- 1929 Neal McIntyre
- 1928 Guy Paulson
- 1927 Neal McIntyre
- 1926 Leonard Schmutte
- 1925 Chet Nelson
- 1924 Ervin Nelson
- 1923 Gunnar Nelson
- 1922 Jack Blakeslee
- 1921 Jack Blakeslee
- 1920 John Simpson (a)
- 1919 Wally Nelson
- 1918 Lee Nelson
- 1917 No tournament
- 1916 Cyril Walker
- 1915 Sidney Cooper

a = amateur
