= Hirth HM 504 =

1930s German aircraft engine

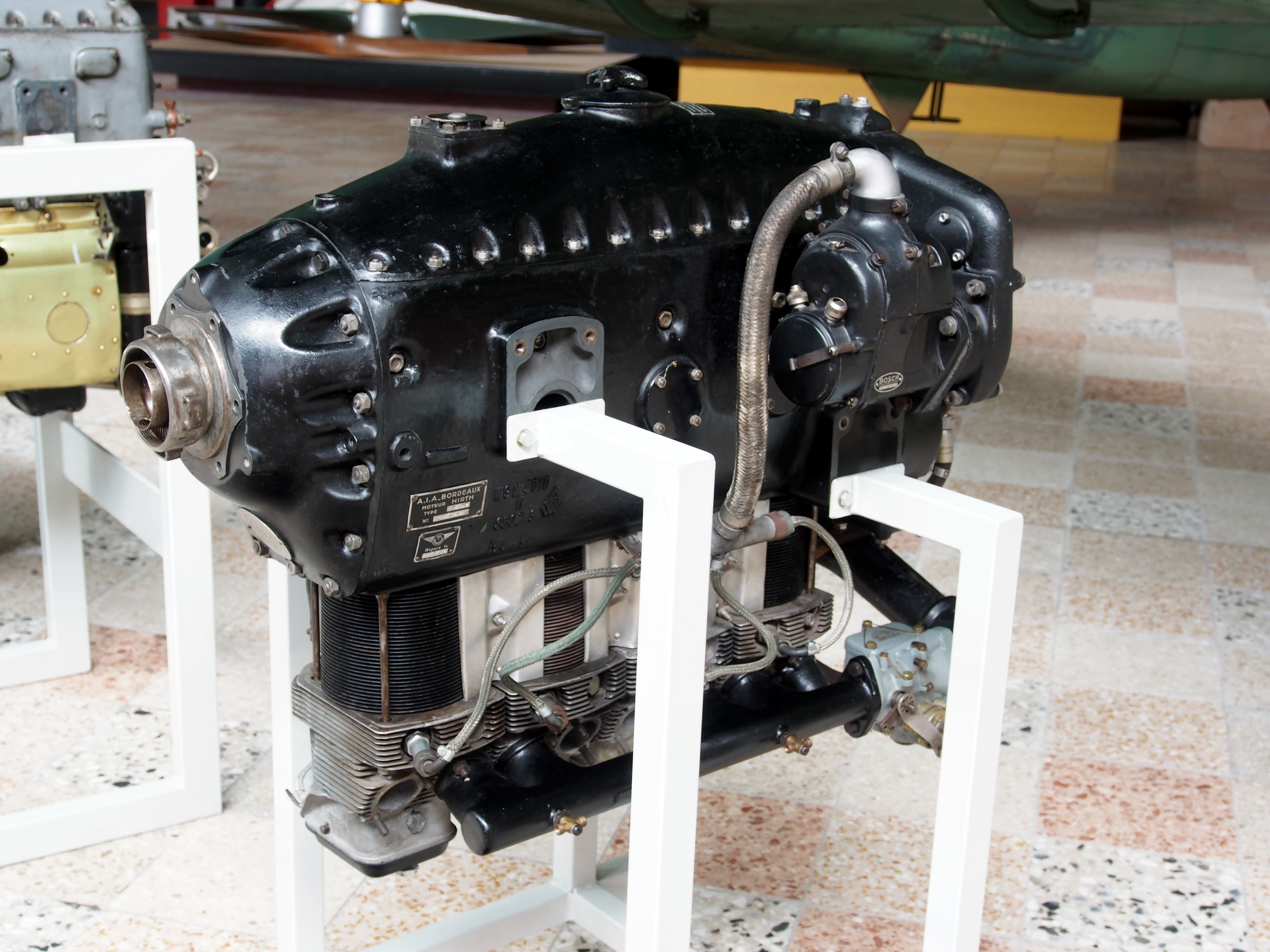
- Hirth HM 504 on display at the Flugausstellung Hermeskeil
- Type: Inline piston engine
- National origin: Germany
- Manufacturer: Hirth-Motoren GmbH, Stuttgart-Zuffenhausen
- Major applications: Bücker Bü 131
- Developed into: Hitachi Hatsukaze

The Hirth HM 504 is a four-cylinder air-cooled inverted inline engine. The HM 504 was a popular engine for light aircraft of the 1930s-1940s, and it was used to power a number of Germany's trainer aircraft of World War II. The engine featured a cast magnesium alloy crankcase made of Elektron The Hitachi Hatsukaze Model 11 was a Japanese licensed version.

== Applications ==
- Arado Ar 79
- Bücker Bü 131
- Bücker Bü 181
- BŻ-1 GIL (helicopter)
- Klemm Kl 35
- Matra-Cantinieau MC-101 (helicopter)
- Morane-Saulnier MS.603
- Payen Arbalète
- Repülőgépgyár Levente II

== Specifications (HM 504 A-2) ==
Data from Flugzeug-Typenbuch. Handbuch der deutschen Luftfahrt- und Zubehör-Industrie 1944, Der Flugmotor. Bauteile und Baumuster

=== General characteristics ===
- Type: 4-cylinder air-cooled inverted inline
- Bore: 105 mm (4.13 in)
- Stroke: 115 mm (4.53 in)
- Displacement: 3.980 L (242.87 cu in)
- Length: 945 mm (37.2 in)
- Width: 520 mm (20.5 in)
- Height: 780 mm (30.7 in)
- Dry weight: 107 kg (236 lb) dry, unequipped

124 kg (273 lb) wet, equipped

=== Components ===
- Valvetrain: 1 inlet and 1 exhaust under-valve per cylinder driven by pushrods and rockers
- Fuel type: 80 Octane
- Oil system: dry sump, pressure feed with scavenge
- Cooling system: air-cooled

=== Performance ===
- Power output:

- 105 PS (104 hp; 77 kW) at 2,530 rpm (5 minutes) at sea level
- 95 PS (94 hp; 70 kW) at 2,450 rpm (30 minutes) at sea level
- 85 PS (84 hp; 63 kW) at 2,360 rpm (max. continuous / cruise) at sea level

- Specific power: 26.35 PS/L (0.43 hp/cu in; 19.38 kW/L)
- Compression ratio: 6.2:1
- Specific fuel consumption: 0.228 kg/PSh (0.510 lb/(hp⋅h); 0.310 kg/kWh) at max continuous
- Oil consumption: 0.002–0.003 kg/PSh (0.004–0.007 lb/(hp⋅h); 0.003–0.004 kg/kWh) at max continuous
- Power-to-weight ratio: 0.98 PS/kg (0.44 hp/lb; 0.72 kW/kg)
- B.M.E.P.: 9.37 atm (9.49 bar; 137.7 psi)

== See also ==
Related development

- Hitachi Hatsukaze
- Ishikawajima Tsu-11

Comparable engines

- Alfa Romeo 110
- Argus As 8
- Blackburn Cirrus Minor
- de Havilland Gipsy Minor
- Elizalde Tigre IV
- Menasco Pirate

Related lists

- List of aircraft engines
