= Bücker Bü 131 Jungmann =

Military training aircraft by Bücker of Germany

Bü 131 Jungmann
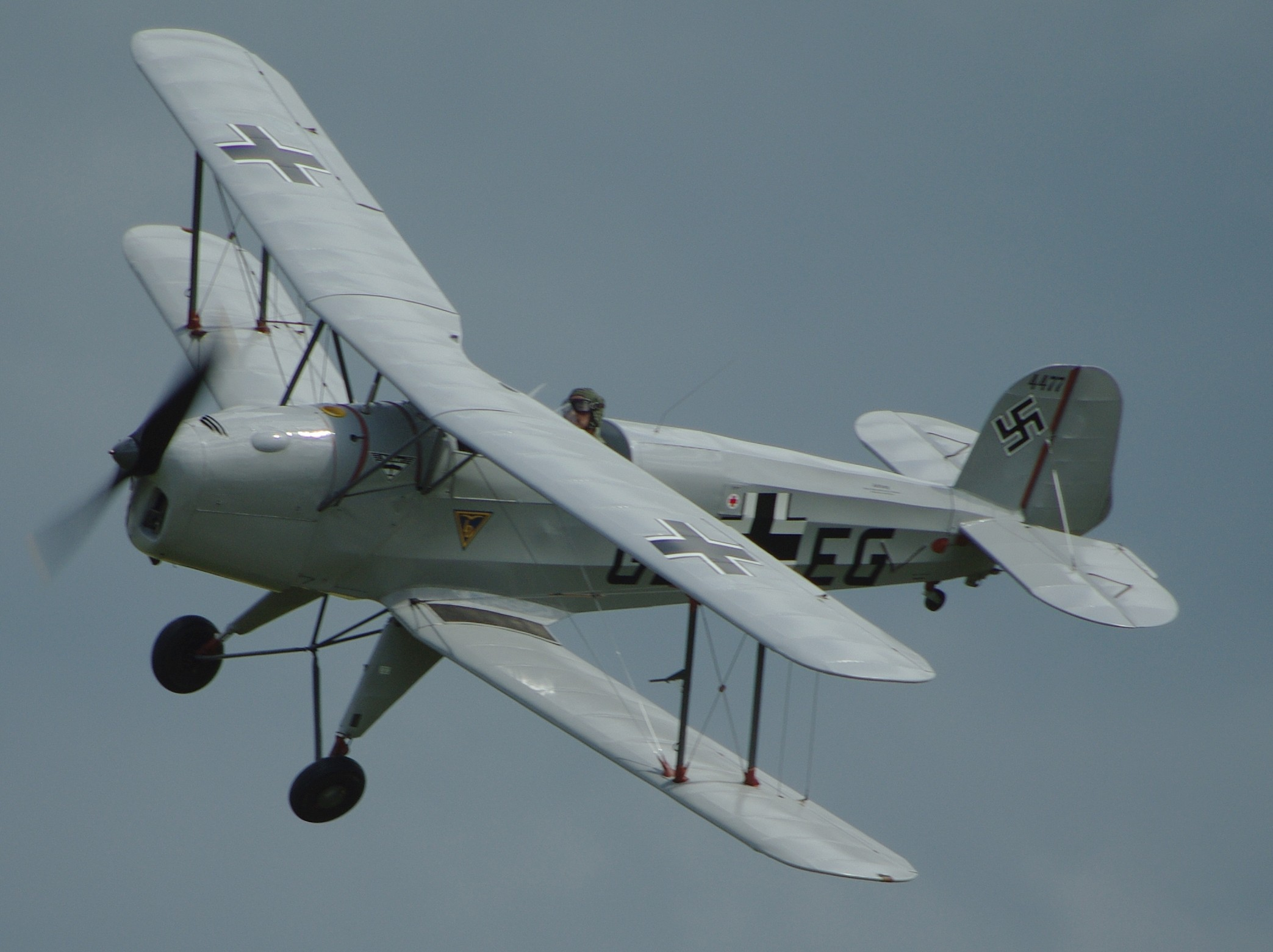

General information
- Type: Basic trainer
- National origin: Germany
- Manufacturer: Bücker Flugzeugbau
- Designer: Carl Bücker
- Primary users: Luftwaffe Spanish Air Force; Imperial Japanese Army Air Service; Royal Hungarian Air Force
- Number built: around 5,000

History
- Manufactured: 1935–1945
- Introduction date: 1935 (Luftwaffe)
- First flight: 27 April 1934
- Retired: 1968 (Spanish Air Force)
- Developed into: Bücker Bü 133 Jungmeister

The Bücker Bü 131 Jungmann (freshman, young man) (Note: Commonly translated as young man, but often used to refer to a freshman, or a member of an organization in their first year.) is a basic biplane trainer aircraft designed and produced by the German aircraft manufacturer Bücker Flugzeugbau. It was the company's first aircraft, as well as being the final biplane to be produced in Germany.

On 27 April 1934, the first prototype Bü 131 performed its maiden flight, which was roughly two years after the company had been founded in Berlin-Johannisthal by Carl Bücker. Anders J. Andersson had led the aircraft's design effort. Comprising both metal and wooden construction, the Bü 131 was designed to be suitable in the trainer role, and even to perform aerobatic manoeuvres. The first deliveries of the Bü 131 occurred in 1934, the Deutscher Luftsportverband (DLV) being a key early customer for the type. Later on, the Bü 131B was selected as the primary basic trainer for the German Luftwaffe. In this capacity, it was operated in large numbers throughout the Second World War.

Throughout the 1930s, there had been substantial demand for the Bü 131, multiple large export orders and production licenses were issued as a result. The Kingdom of Yugoslavia was the largest pre-war export customer for the type, flying as many as 400 Bü 131s at one point. Hundreds were produced locally by the Spanish aircraft company Construcciones Aeronáuticas SA (CASA). In excess of 1,300 Bü 131s were operated by the military air services of Imperial Japan under local designations of Kokusai Ki-86 and Kyūshū K9W Momoji. The Bü 131 remained in operation with numerous air forces for decades after the conflict, some choosing to retain the type through to the late 1960s. It has proved to be a relatively popular biplane with private pilots, who have often elected to have their aircraft refitted with modern engines for increased performance.

== Development ==
The origins of the Bü 131 can be traced back to the work of one man, Carl Bücker. After serving in the Kaiserliche Marine during the First World War, Bücker relocated to Sweden and became the managing director of Svenska Aero AB (Not to be confused with Svenska Aeroplan AB, SAAB). He later returned to Germany with Anders J. Andersson, a young designer from SAAB, and founded a new company, Bücker Flugzeugbau GmbH, in Berlin-Johannisthal during 1932. From the onset, Anderson headed up the company's design team, (Note: Anderson played a key leadership role in Bücker Flugzeugbau up until 1939 and the outbreak of the Second World War.) and immediately set about developing the company's first aircraft, out of the efforts for which ultimately emerged the Bü 131.

The aircraft was designed to be suitable for aerobatic manoeuvres and training activities. It featured numerous conventional features for such aircraft at that time, being a biplane with two open cockpits in tandem along with fixed landing gear. Both the upper and lower wings were broadly identical in terms of design, to the extent that they could be readily interchanged with on another. Accordingly, all of the wings, which had an 11 degree sweep back and positive stagger, were equipped with ailerons. The wings had a structure largely composed of I-section wooden spars along with a fabric covering.

The fuselage of the Bü 131 comprised a structure of welded steel tubing, the covering of which was metal for the front section and fabric around the rear section. Both fuel and oil were accommodated in tanks within the fuselage. Hinged to the side of the fuselage was the twin main legs of the undercarriage, which were furnished with both spring and oil-based shock absorbers, while a spring tailwheel was also present on the underside of the aft fuselage. The mainwheels were outfitted with balloon tyres and brakes.

On 27 April 1934, the first prototype, D-3150, performed its maiden flight; it was piloted by Joachim von Koppen. Early aircraft were powered by a single Hirth HM60R four-cylinder inverted air-cooled inline engine, capable of producing up to 80 hp (60 kW). Initial deliveries to customers commenced later that same year, making it the company's first aircraft to attain production status. It would ultimately be the final biplane to be manufactured in quantity within Germany.

During 1936, production was transitioned to a revised model, designated Bü 131B. This model featured a more powerful Hirth 504A-2, which could produce up to 105 hp (78 kW). The Bü 131C model, which never entered quantity production, was powered by the British Blackburn Cirrus Minor, capable of up to 80 hp (60 kW).

Due to the copious demand for the type, multiple companies were granted licenses to produce the Bü 131. One such license was secured by the rival German manufacturer Dornier, which built 88 aircraft of the 94 ultimately operated by Switzerland. Eleven aircraft (one prototype and ten production aircraft) were built as the T 131 in Czechoslovakia by Ringhoffer-Tatra prior to the German occupation of Czechoslovakia in 1938, with further aircraft under production being completed for the Germany before Tatra was ordered to cease aircraft production. While Tatra was ordered to stop production by the German occupiers, the Prague-based aircraft manufacturer Aero, was assigned to build the Bu-131D-2 for the Luftwaffe, with production reaching 24 per month. Production at Aero continued until September 1940, before the factory transitioned to production of the Focke-Wulf Fw 189 Uhu, with about 300 built. Perhaps the most ambitious licensee was the Spanish aircraft company Construcciones Aeronáuticas SA (CASA), which ultimately locally produced roughly 530 aircraft until the line was finally closed down sometime in the early 1960s.

In 1945, Aero restarted production of the Bü 131 to meet the needs of the Czechoslovak Air Force for training aircraft. Initial production, designated the Aero C-4, was powered by the Hirth HM 504A engine, with deliveries starting in April 1946. After building 20–30 C-4s, production switched to the Aero C-104, powered by the Czechoslovak Walter Minor 4-III engine. Production continued until 1949, with 260 built.

== Operational history ==
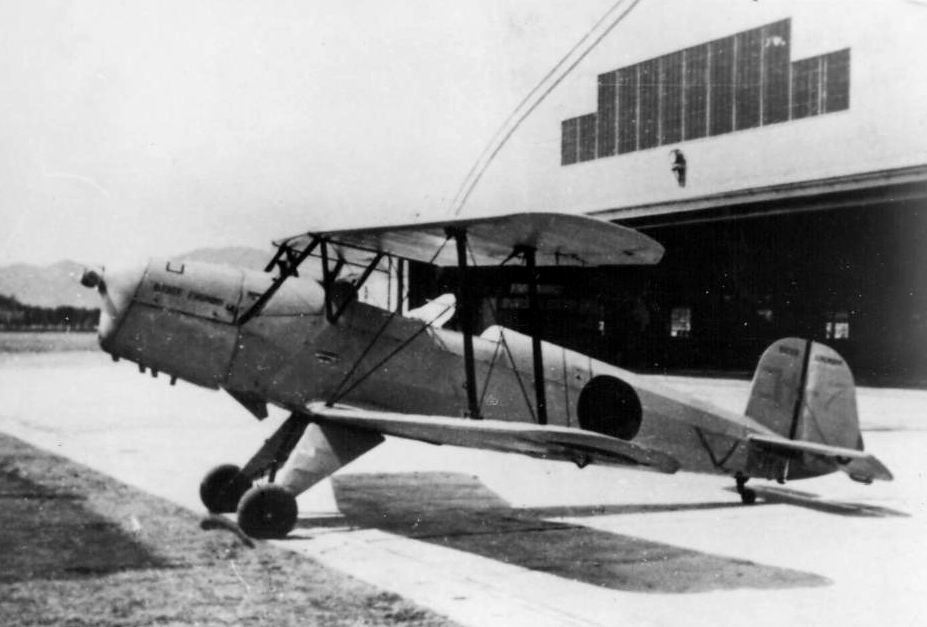
A Japanese Kokusai Ki-86A in 1945.

Being both a sturdy and agile aircraft, the Bü 131A was first delivered to the Deutscher Luftsportverband (DLV) during 1934. Shortly thereafter, the Bü 131B was selected as the primary basic trainer for the German Luftwaffe. During the Second World War, the aircraft served with nearly all of the Luftwaffe's primary flying schools, as well as with night harassment units such as Nachtschlacht Gruppen (NSGr) 2, 11, and 12. During the latter half of the conflict, the Bü 131 was gradually supplanted by the Bücker Bü 181 Bestmann, a newer monoplane trainer.

Prior to the outbreak of war, the Kingdom of Yugoslavia was the leading export customer for the type; it has been claimed that as many as 400 Bü 131s may have found their way there. Another pre-war operator was the Kingdom of Bulgaria, which had 15 aircraft, while the Kingdom of Romania procured around 40 Bü 131s.

The Bü 131 was also widely used by Imperial Japan, where they were normally equipped with locally built Hatsukaze engines. 1,037 aircraft were built under the Kokusai Ki-86 designation for the Imperial Japanese Army Air Service while a further 339 aircraft were produced as the Kyūshū K9W Momoji for the Imperial Japanese Navy Air Service.

During the post-war era, the type continued to be flown by several operators. Most substantially, the Bü 131 remained the primary basic trainer of the Spanish Air Force through to 1968. The Czechoslovak C-4 and C-104 were used to equip the Czechoslovak military air academy, and from 1947, aircraft were released to civilian use. In the 1950s, C-104s were phased out of Czechoslovak Air Force duties, being transferred to aeroclubs, with the last aircraft being retired from Svazarm flying clubs in 1964.

In the 1960s and early 1970s, the Spanish, Swiss, and Czech governments disposed their Bü 131s, often to private owners, leading to numerous aircraft being exported to the United States. About 200 Bü 131 survived through to the twenty-first century, although many of these have been outfitted with newer engines such as the 150 hp (110 kW) Lycoming O-320 or 180 hp (130 kW) Lycoming O-360 four-cylinder horizontally-opposed engines, which have inverted fuel and oil systems for aerobatic flight. Well known aerobatic pilot Marion Cole flew a Bucker Jungman fitted with a Lycoming IO-360 with an inverted fuel system in many airshows and in the World Championship held in East Germany in 1968 as a member of the American Team.

The Bü 131 has often been praised for its outstanding handling characteristics when compared to other biplanes and even some modern aerobatic types. Upkeep and maintenance for the Jungmann is comparable to other antique aircraft and is often superior when fitted with the Lycoming engines. Airframe parts are available from sources in Europe.

During 1994, the Bü 131 was briefly restored to production using leftover CASA jigs by Bücker Prado in Spain, resulting in 21 aircraft being constructed as the BP 131. Also in the 1990s, Janusz Karasiewicz also started production of a derivative of the Bü 131 in Poland, basing the aircraft on original Czech design information. A total of 20 aircraft were reportedly manufactured in Poland between 1994 and 2000.

== Variants ==
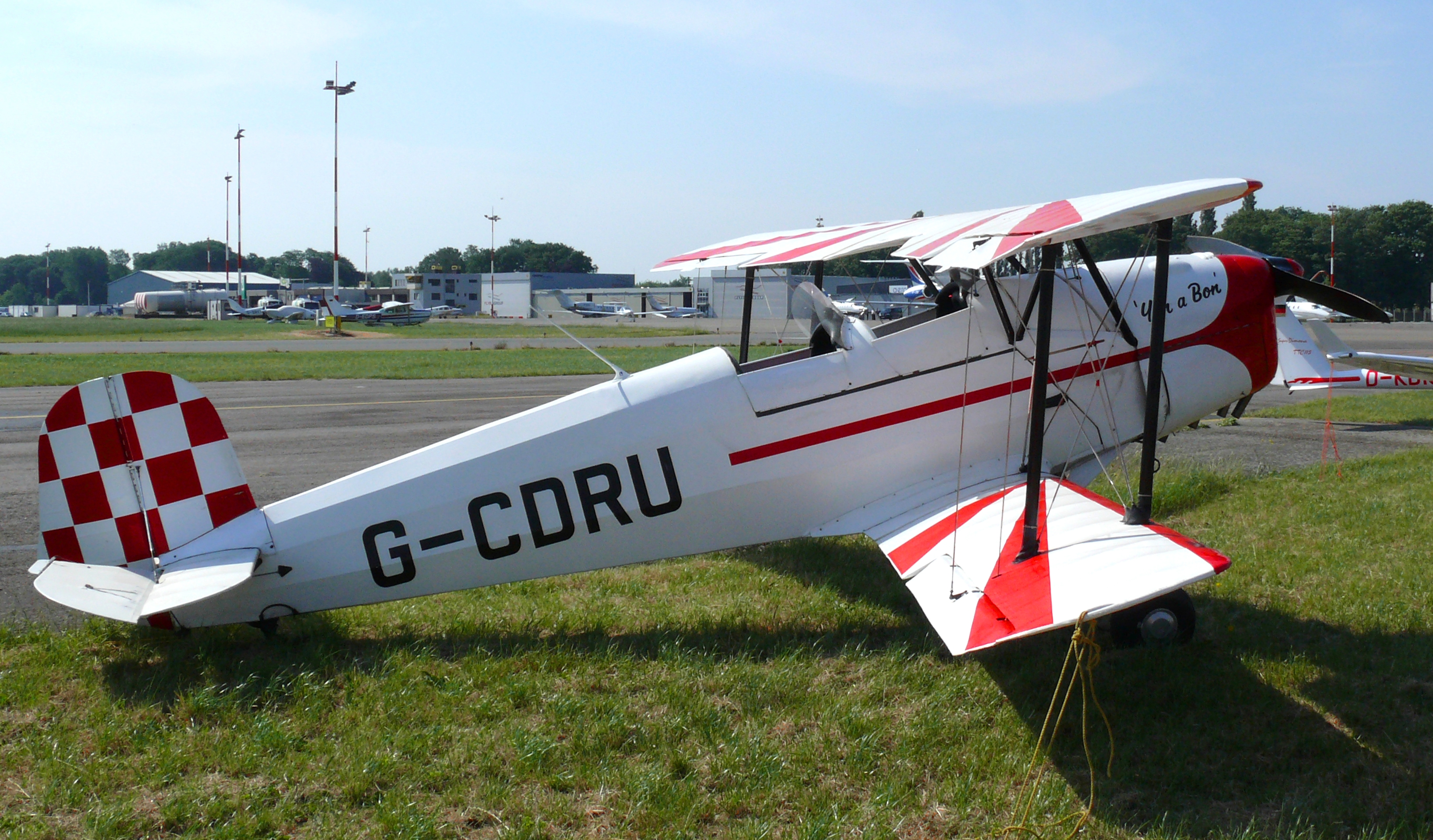
Spanish built CASA 1.131 still being flown

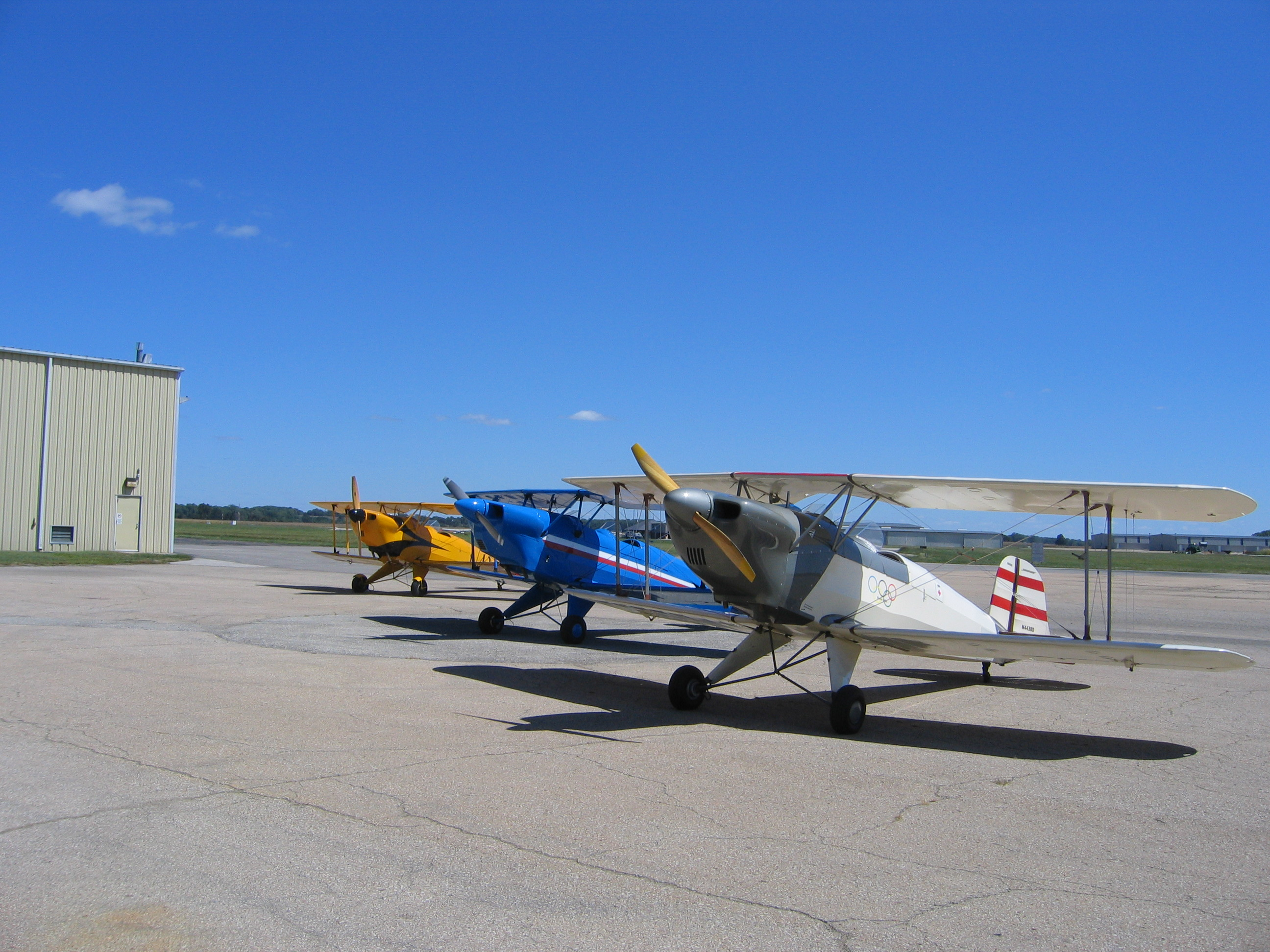
Lycoming-powered Bü 131s in the US

Bü 131A
Two-seat primary trainer biplane. Initial production version.
Bü 131B
Improved version, powered by the more powerful Hirth HM 504A-2 piston engine.
Bü 131C
Experimental version, fitted with 90 hp (67 kW) Cirrus Minor piston engine. One built.
Nippon Kokusai Ki-86A Army Type 4 Primary Trainer
Japanese production version for the Imperial Japanese Army Air Service. Powered by a Hitachi Ha47
Nippon Kokusai Ki-86B Army Type 4 Primary Trainer
Wooden airframe version to relieve scarce supplies of strategic materials.
Kyūshū K9W1 Momiji Navy Type 2 Trainer Model 11
Japanese production version for the Imperial Japanese Navy. Powered by the Hitachi GK4A Hatsukaze 11
Tatra T.131
Czechoslovakia, pre-war licence production by Ringhoffer-Tatra in Kopřivnice.
Aero C-4
Mass-produced in Aero factory in occupied Czechoslovakia during wartime under original Bücker Bü 131B designation, used postwar with original Hirth engine.
Aero C-104
Czechoslovakia, postwar development with a Walter Minor 4-III engine, 260 built.
CASA 1.131
Spanish license-built versions with Hirth HM 504 or 125 hp (93 kW) ENMA Tigre G-IVA.
BP 131
modern license-built version
SSH T-131P
Pre-production modern Polish version, powered by 78 kW (105 hp) Walter Minor 4-III engine. Four built from 1994.
SSH T-131PA
Main Polish production version, with 103 kW (138 hp) LOM M332AK engine. First flew 1995. Three preproduction built 2012 and 29 series production aircraft by 2022.

== Operators ==
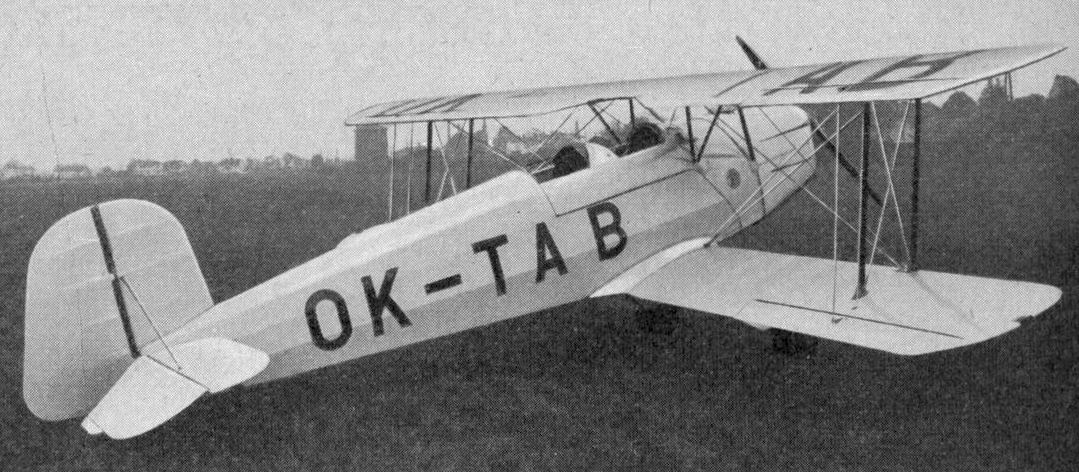
Tatra T.131 photo from Le Pontentiel Aérien Mondial 1936

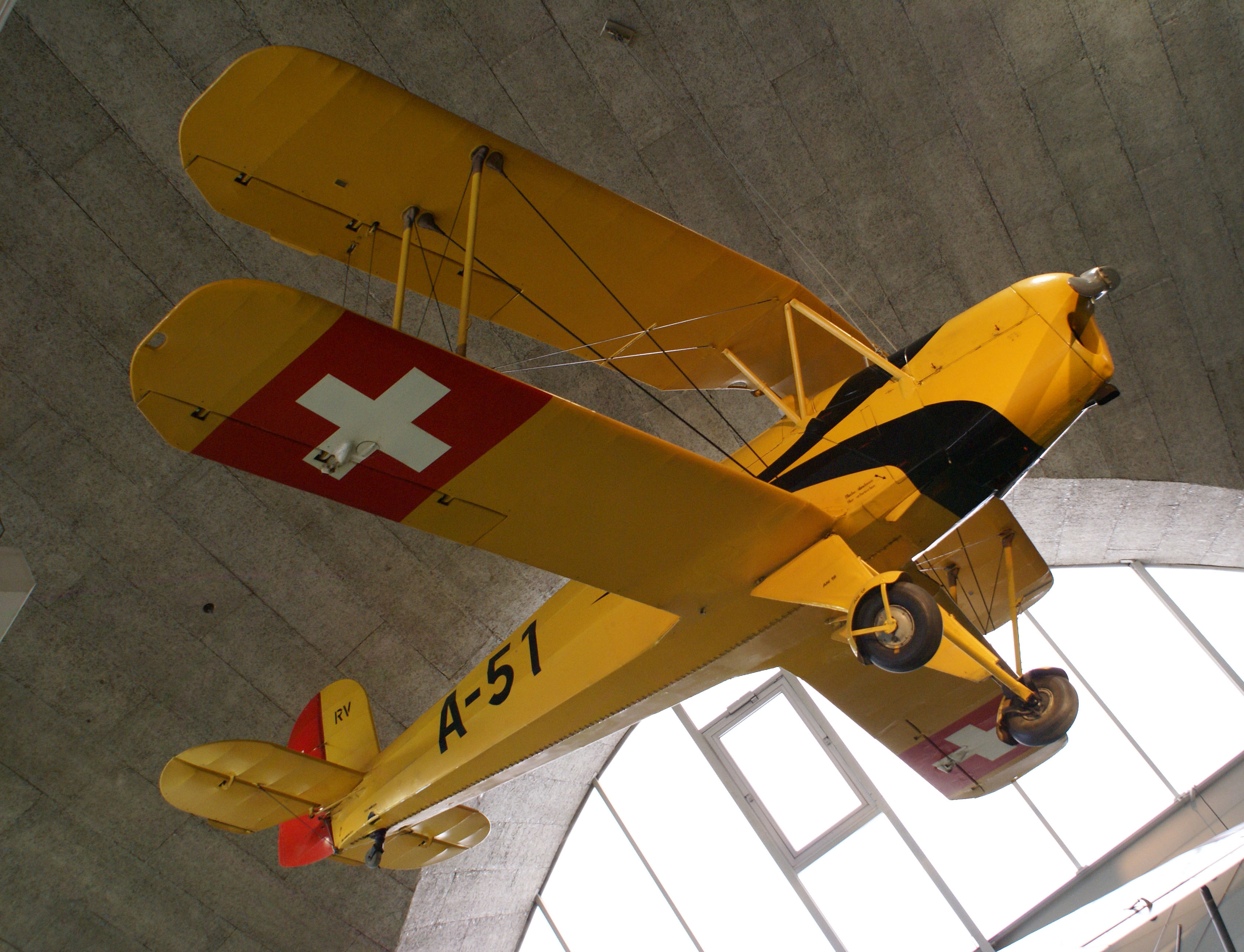
A Swiss Air Force Bü 131 B.

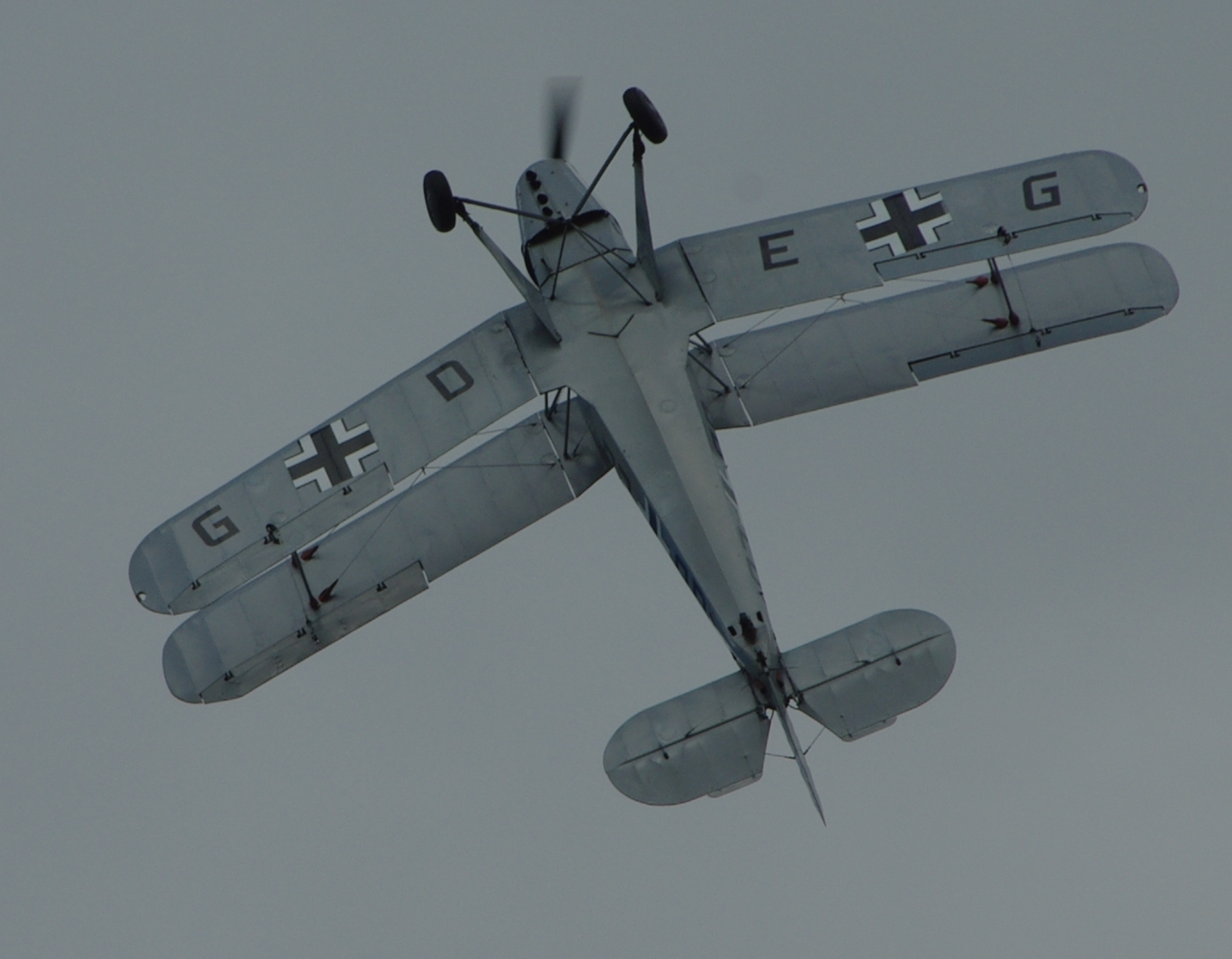
Jungmann G-RETA of the Shuttleworth Trust enters a loop

Bulgaria

- Bulgarian Air Force

Czechoslovakia

- Czechoslovak Air Force
- Sbor národní bezpečnosti (Czechoslovak national security guard)
- Svazarm

Independent State of Croatia

- Zrakoplovstvo Nezavisne Države Hrvatske

Germany

- Luftwaffe

Greece

- Hellenic Air Force

Hungary

- Royal Hungarian Air Force

Japan

- Imperial Japanese Army Air Service
- Imperial Japanese Navy Air Service

Lithuania

- Aeroclub of Lithuania

Netherlands

- Royal Netherlands Air Force

Poland

- Polish Air Force (1 bought for tests before 1939)

Romania

- Royal Romanian Air Force
- Romanian Air Force

Slovakia

- Slovak Air Force (1939–1945)

South Africa

- South African Air Force

Spain

- Spanish Air Force

Switzerland

- Swiss Air Force

Kingdom of Yugoslavia

- Yugoslav Royal Air Force

Yugoslavia

- SFR Yugoslav Air Force

== Specifications (Bü 131B) ==
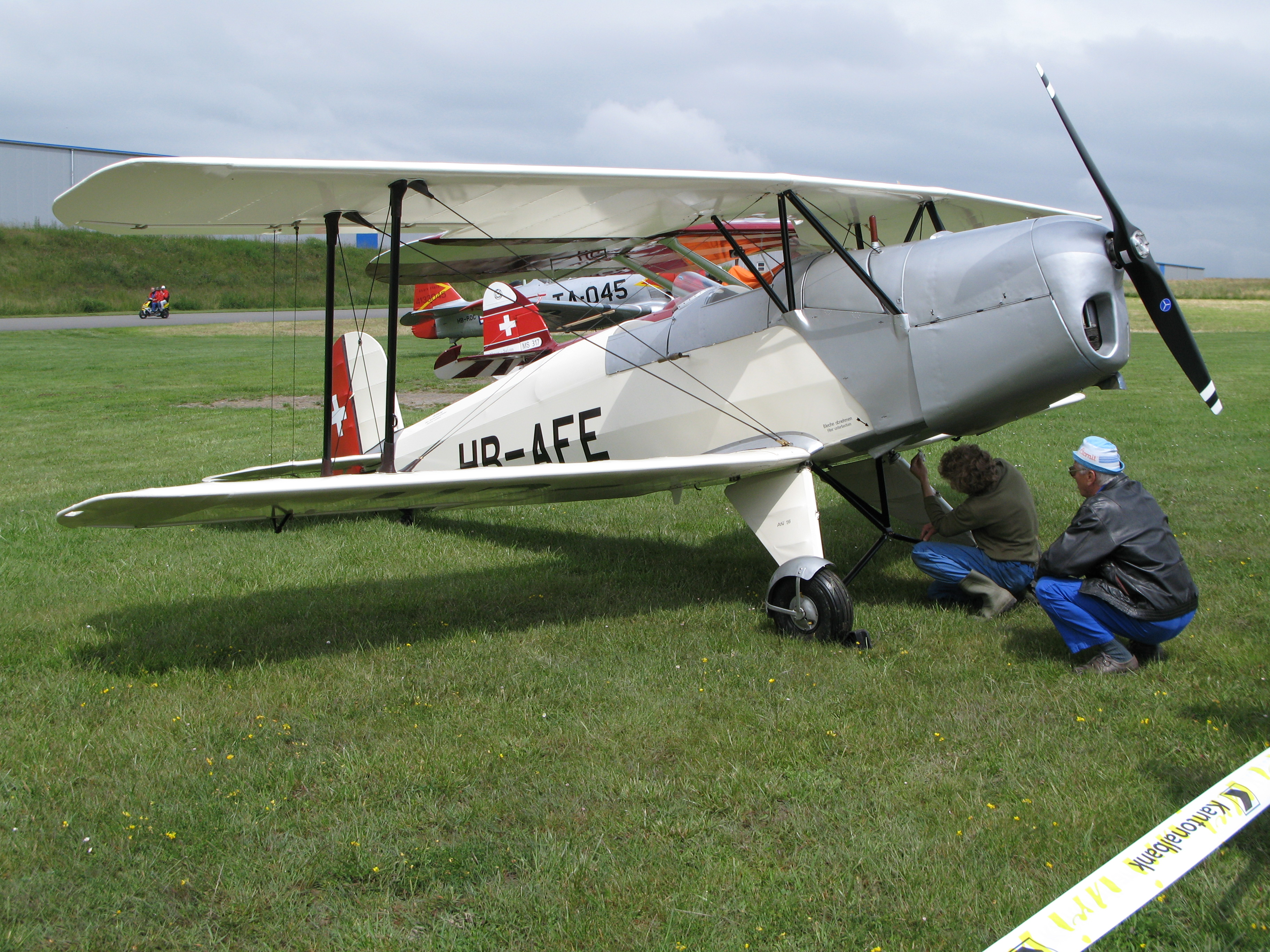
a 1938 Bü 131

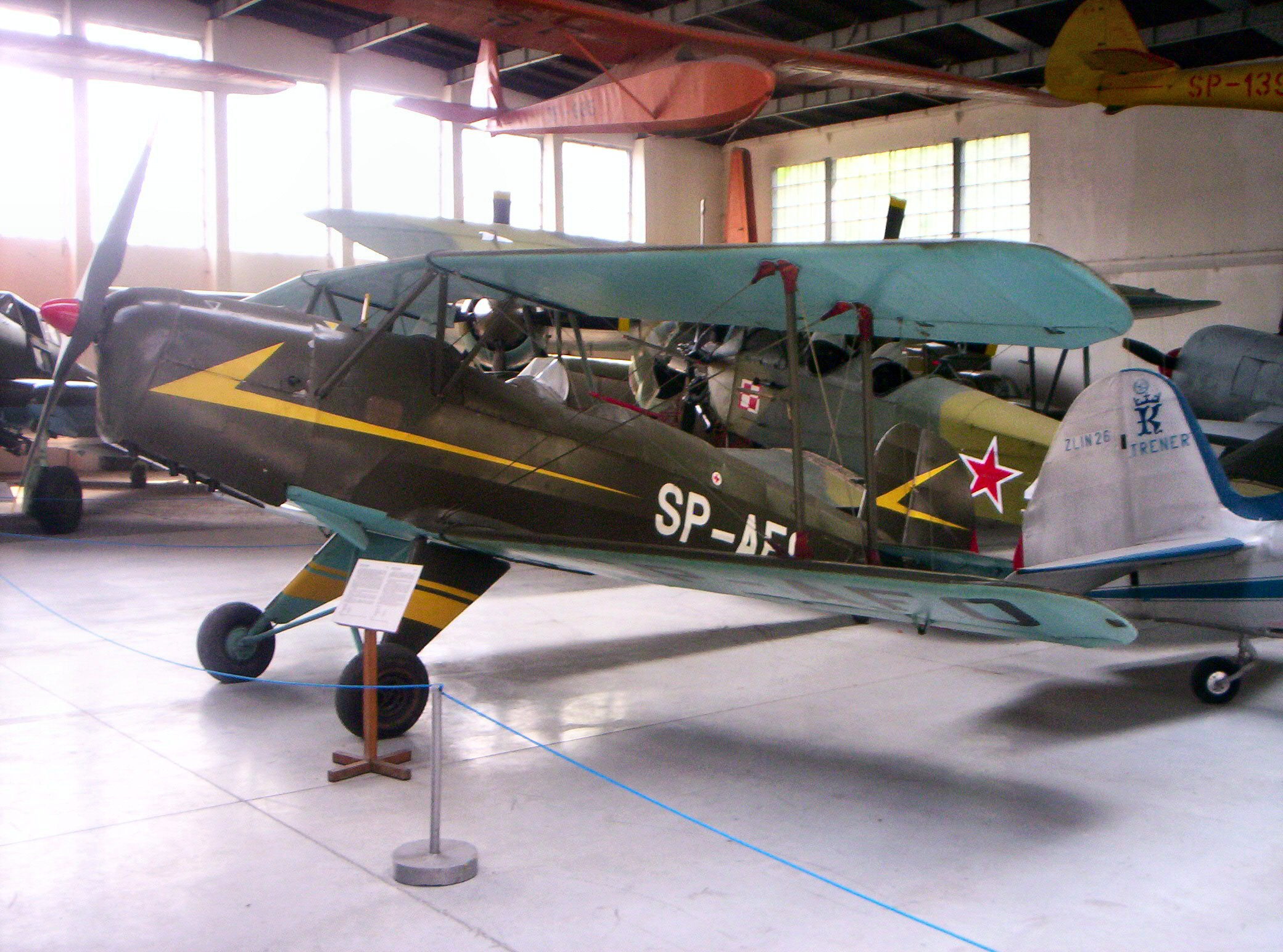
Bücker Bü 131B Jungmann (Polish Aviation Museum)

Data from Jane's Fighting Aircraft of World War II

General characteristics

- Crew: 2
- Length: 6.62 m (21 ft 9 in)
- Wingspan: 7.4 m (24 ft 3 in)
- Height: 2.25 m (7 ft 5 in)
- Wing area: 13.5 m^{2} (145 sq ft)
- Airfoil: NACA 3410.5
- Empty weight: 380 kg (838 lb)
- Gross weight: 670 kg (1,477 lb)
- Powerplant: 1 × Hirth HM 504 four-cylinder inverted air-cooled in-line piston engine, 75 kW (100 hp)
- Propellers: 2-bladed fixed-pitch propeller

Performance

- Maximum speed: 183 km/h (114 mph, 99 kn)
- Cruise speed: 170 km/h (110 mph, 92 kn)
- Landing speed: 82 km/h (51 mph; 44 kn)
- Range: 650 km (400 mi, 350 nmi)
- Service ceiling: 4,300 m (14,100 ft)
- Time to altitude: 1,000 m (3,300 ft) in five minutes and 12 seconds

2,000 m (6,600 ft) in 12 minutes
3,000 m (9,800 ft) in 23 minutes
4,000 m (13,000 ft) in 45 minutes

- Wing loading: 46.3 kg/m^{2} (9.5 lb/sq ft)
- Power/mass: 0.120 kW/kg (0.073 hp/lb)

== See also ==
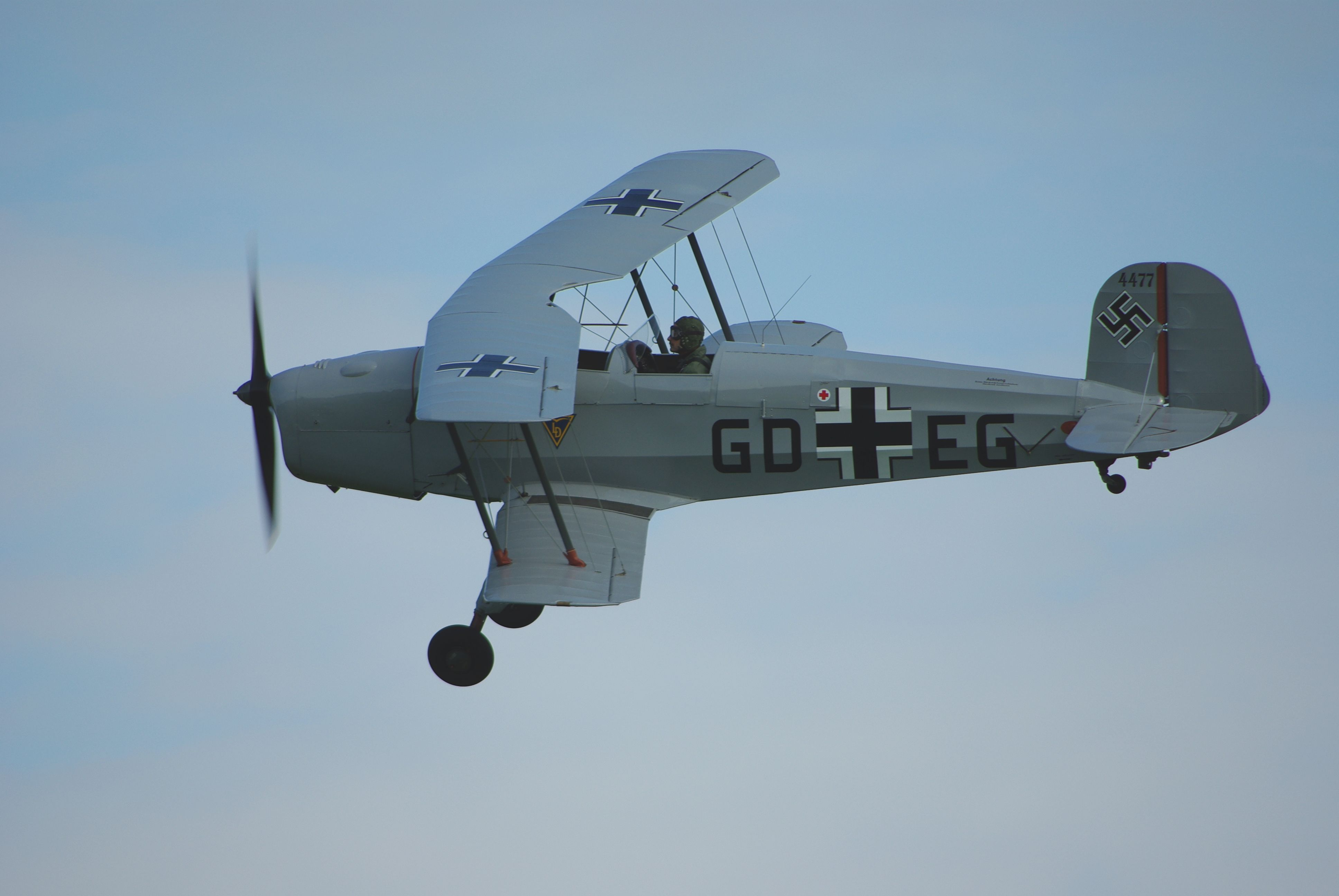
Shuttleworth's Jungmann G-RETA at Old Warden

Related development

- Bücker Bü 133 Jungmeister
- B&F Fk131 Bücker Jungmann – a 21st-century replica aircraft

Aircraft of comparable role, configuration, and era

- Boeing-Stearman Model 75
- de Havilland Tiger Moth
- Fleet Finch
- Great Lakes Sport Trainer
- Repülőgépgyár Levente II
- Stampe-Vertongen SV.4
- Polikarpov Po-2
- RWD 8

Related lists

- List of interwar military aircraft
- List of military aircraft of Germany
