= Mizuno =

Japanese sports equipment company

Mizuno Corporation

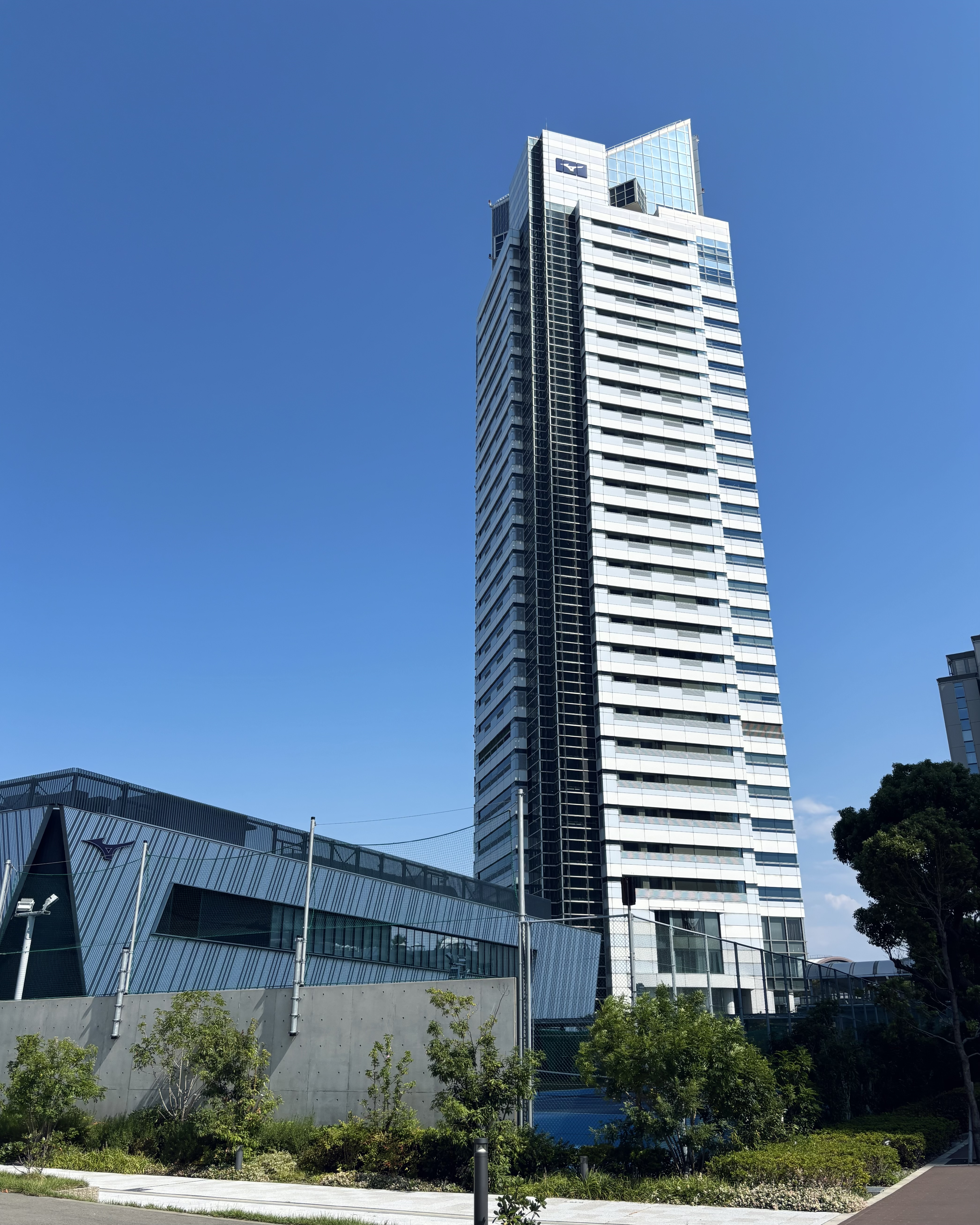
- Mizuno Crista, the Osaka head office
- Native name: ミズノ株式会社 / 美津濃株式会社
- Romanized name: Mizuno Kabushiki-gaisha
- Type: Public (K.K.)
- Traded as: TYO: 8022
- Industry: Sports equipment
- Founded: April 1, 1906; 120 years ago
- Founder: Rihachi Mizuno; Rizo Mizuno
- Headquarters: Suminoe, Osaka, Japan
- Key people: Akito Mizuno (President)
- Products: Clothing; Sportswear; Footwear
- Revenue: JPY 148,703,000,000 (2010)
- Net income: JPY 1,406,000,000 (2010)
- Number of employees: 5,368 (2013)
- Website: mizuno.com (Corporate website)

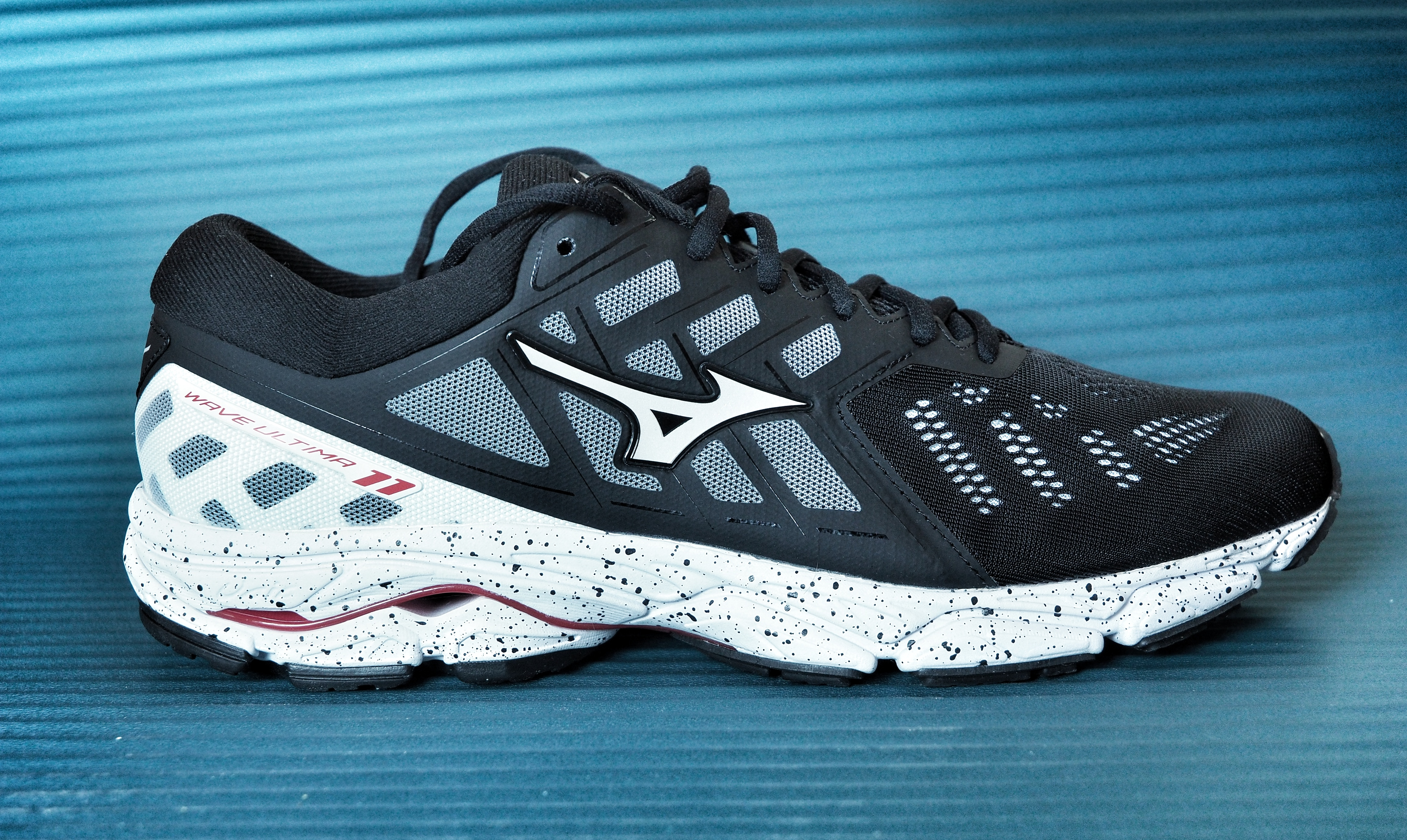
Mizuno Wave Ultima 11 running shoe

Mizuno Corporation (Japanese: ミズノ株式会社 / 美津濃株式会社, Hepburn: Mizuno Kabushiki-gaisha) (TYO: 8022) is a Japanese sports equipment and sportswear company, founded in Osaka in 1906 by Rihachi Mizuno. Today, Mizuno is a global corporation which makes a wide variety of sports equipment and sportswear for table tennis, boxing, badminton, golf, baseball, mixed martial arts, association football, gridiron football, futsal, judo, rugby, running, skiing, athletics, swimming, tennis, handball, volleyball and netball.

== History ==
Mizuno was founded in 1906 as Mizuno Brothers, Ltd. by Rihachi Mizuno (1884-1970) and his younger brother Rizo, in Osaka. The shop sold Western-world sundries, including baseballs, and then in 1907 began to sell order-made athletic wear. In 1910 the shop moved to Umeda-Shinmichi and its name was changed to Mizuno Shop. In 1913 the firm began to manufacture baseballs and gloves. In 1933 Mizuno presented Star Line, the first Japanese made golf clubs. By 1935 its golf club showroom was the world's largest. In 1941 the company name was changed to Mizuno Co., Ltd, and has remained the same since. During World War II, Mizuno manufactured military ordnance for Japan's war effort.

The first American factory was established in Los Angeles, under the denomination American Mizuno in 1961. During the following years, Mizuno signed sponsorship deals with some of the most prominent personalities in sports, such as track and field athlete Carl Lewis, the All Blacks rugby team, former San Francisco 49ers quarterback Joe Montana for most of his years in the NFL, the Manu Samoa rugby team, Czech tennis player Ivan Lendl, and golf player Nick Faldo and baseball Hall of Famer Rickey Henderson.

To gain a foothold in the baseball glove market in the United States, the mobile "Mizuno Baseball Workshop" was introduced in the late 1970s to service major league clubs during spring training in Arizona and Florida. The forty-foot (12 m) van contained extensive leather-working equipment and was operated by two skilled Japanese craft workers who could produce made-to-order gloves and repair all brands. Rihachi Mizuno also devoted time to promote sports ranging from research and production of equipment or hosting baseball tournaments in his native Japan. A sports foundation was established in his will, and he was inducted into the Japanese Baseball Hall of Fame in 1971.

The company also expanded its operation centres opening new factories in Germany, France, China, Scotland and Hong Kong.

In 2023, the World Intellectual Property Organization (WIPO)'s Madrid Yearly Review ranked Mizuno's number of marks applications filled under the Madrid System as 8th in the world, with 79 trademarks applications submitted during 2023.

== Aircraft ==
To commemorate the company's 30th anniversary, the company began manufacturing gliders in 1936. Among the company's military design efforts included the Mizuno Shinryu, a proposed rocket-powered interceptor that never left the prototyping stages, and the Mizuno MXZ1, a training glider.

== Golf ==
Mizuno is a manufacturer of golf clubs and accessories.

=== Clubs ===
Mizuno golf equipment range includes drivers, fairway woods, hybrids, irons, wedges, and putters, with prominent product lines such as the JPX and Mizuno Pro series.

JPX Series: JPX irons, such as the JPX925 Hot Metal, Forged, and Tour models, are designed for a range of players and balance ball speed, forgiveness, and distance control. JPX drivers feature technologies such as Cortech chambers and adjustable weighting systems intended to influence launch conditions.

Mizuno Pro Series: Forged irons in this series, including the Mizuno Pro 241, 243, and 245, are designed with traditional blade-style aesthetics and are used by some professional golfers. Mizuno also offers Signature Series models—Mizuno Pro S-1 and S-3—which provide compact profiles and precision shaping. The company's custom fitting services leverage its Shaft Optimizer 3D technology to recommend club configurations based on swing data.

=== Putters ===
Mizuno's M.CRAFT series putters are milled from 1025 mild carbon steel and offered in multiple head shapes. Some models are supplied with weighting kits to allow customization of balance and feel.

=== Golf Balls ===
A 2020s Mizuno RB 566 golf ball.

Mizuno produces golf balls such as the RB Tour, RB 566, Mizuno Pro S, and Mizuno Pro X. The RB Tour line is intended for players seeking spin control, while the RB 566 series is designed for increased carry and forgiveness. The Mizuno Pro S and Pro X models are recent additions positioned to offer tour-level performance, with construction optimized for soft feel and trajectory consistency across swing speeds.

=== Players ===
Many players have played using Mizuno equipment during their careers, including 13 of the 24 players who have ever held a men's #1 ranking (as of 2022). Tiger Woods used Mizuno golf clubs until he signed a deal with Titleist and turned professional in 1996, but continued to play with Mizuno clubs for his first pro year and a half while waiting for his ideal set of clubs from Titleist; notably, he won his first Masters Tournament victory in 1997 with his Mizuno clubs.
