= Yokosuka MXY9 Shūka =

Japanese training glider project

MXY9 Shūka

General information
- Type: Trainer
- Designer: Yokosuka

History
- Developed from: Yokosuka MXY8

The Yokosuka MXY9 Shūka (秋花, autumn flower) was a projected development of the MXY8 training glider, adding a small motorjet engine, the Tsu-11. It was intended to provide further training for pilots who were to fly the Mitsubishi J8M/Ki-200 Shūsui rocket-powered interceptor aircraft.

None were built prior to Japan's surrender and the end of World War II.

== Specifications (MXY9, as designed) ==
Data from Japanese Secret Projects

General characteristics

- Length: 6.05 m (19 ft 10 in)
- Wingspan: 9.5 m (31 ft 2 in)
- Height: 2.7 m (8 ft 10 in)
- Wing area: 17.7 m^{2} (191 sq ft)
- Powerplant: 1 × Tsu-11 thermojet, 1.7 kN (380 lbf) thrust

== See also ==
Related development

- Mitsubishi Shūsui
- Yokosuka MXY8

Related lists

- List of military aircraft of Japan
