= List of Lockheed P-3 Orion variants =

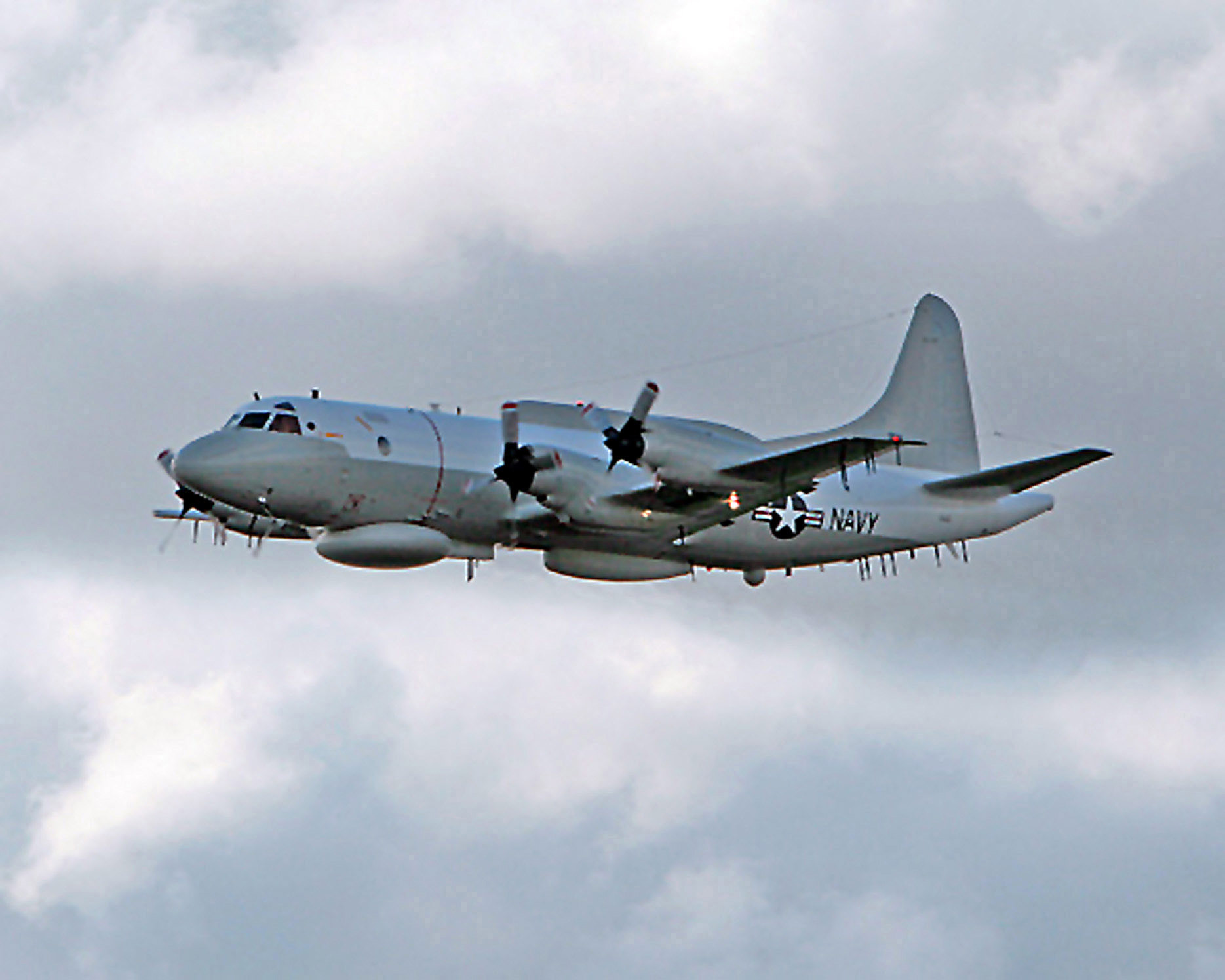
Lockheed EP-3E ARIES II in 2006

The Lockheed P-3 Orion maritime surveillance aircraft underwent a number of variants and specific unique design elements. The following is an extensive catalogue of each variant and/or design stage of the aircraft. For a broader article on the history of the P-3, see Lockheed P-3 Orion.

== P-3A and variants ==
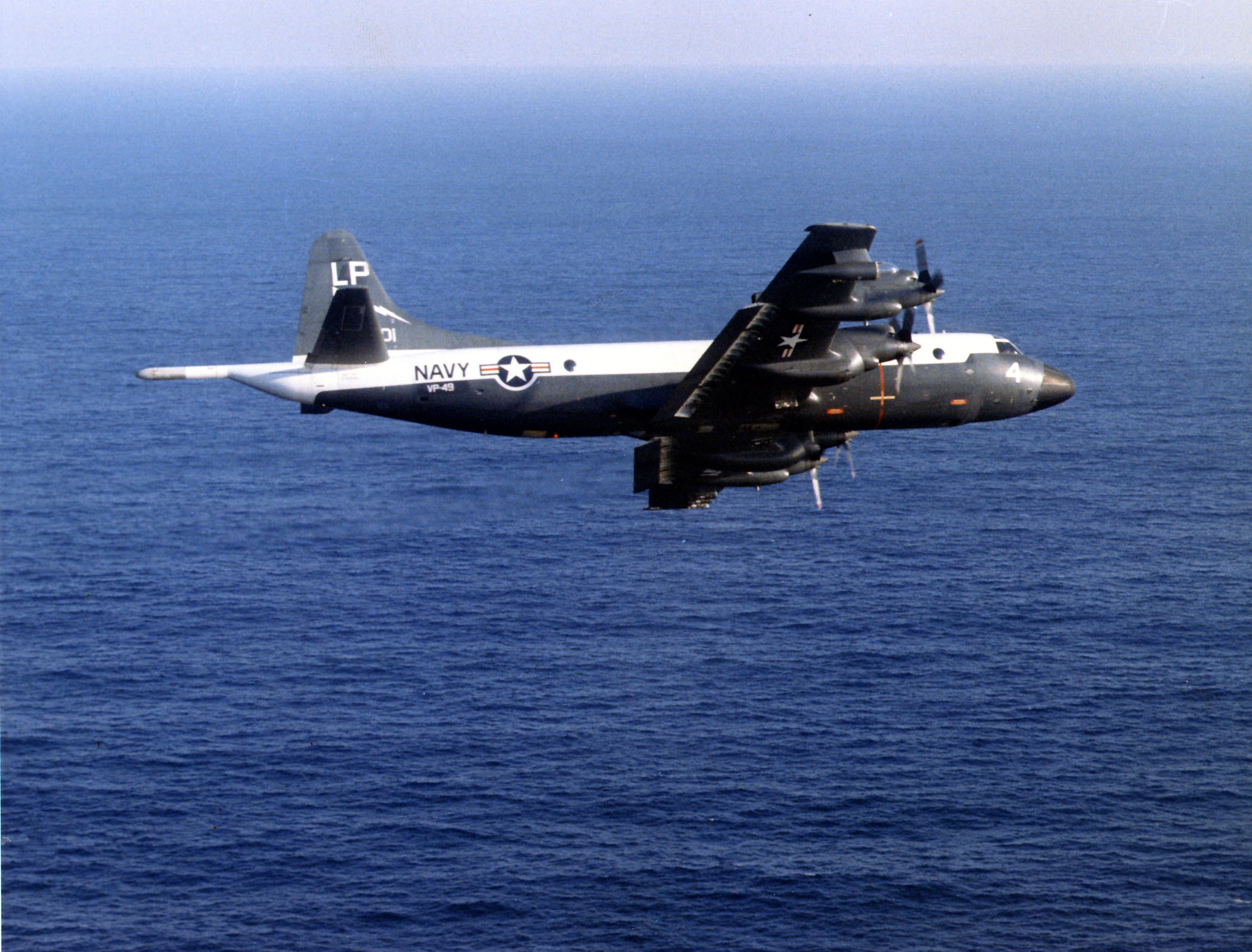
A P-3A from VP-49 wearing the original blue/white scheme, in 1964

- P-3A: The original production version; 157 built.
- P-3A (CS): Four P-3A aircraft were reequipped with AN/APG-66 radars for use by U.S. Customs and Border Protection's Office of Air and Marine.
- EP-3A: Seven modified for electronic reconnaissance testing.
- NP-3A: Three modified for the U.S. Naval Research Laboratory.
- RP-3A: Two modified for scientific uses for the former Oceanographic Development Squadron EIGHT (VXN-8) at NAS Patuxent River.
- TP-3A: 12 modified for training duties in Fleet Replacement Squadrons with all ASW gear removed.
- UP-3A: 38 reconfigured as utility transports with all the ASW gear removed.
- VP-3A: Three WP-3A and two P-3A aircraft converted into VIP/staff transports.
- WP-3A: Four converted for weather reconnaissance.

== P-3B and variants ==
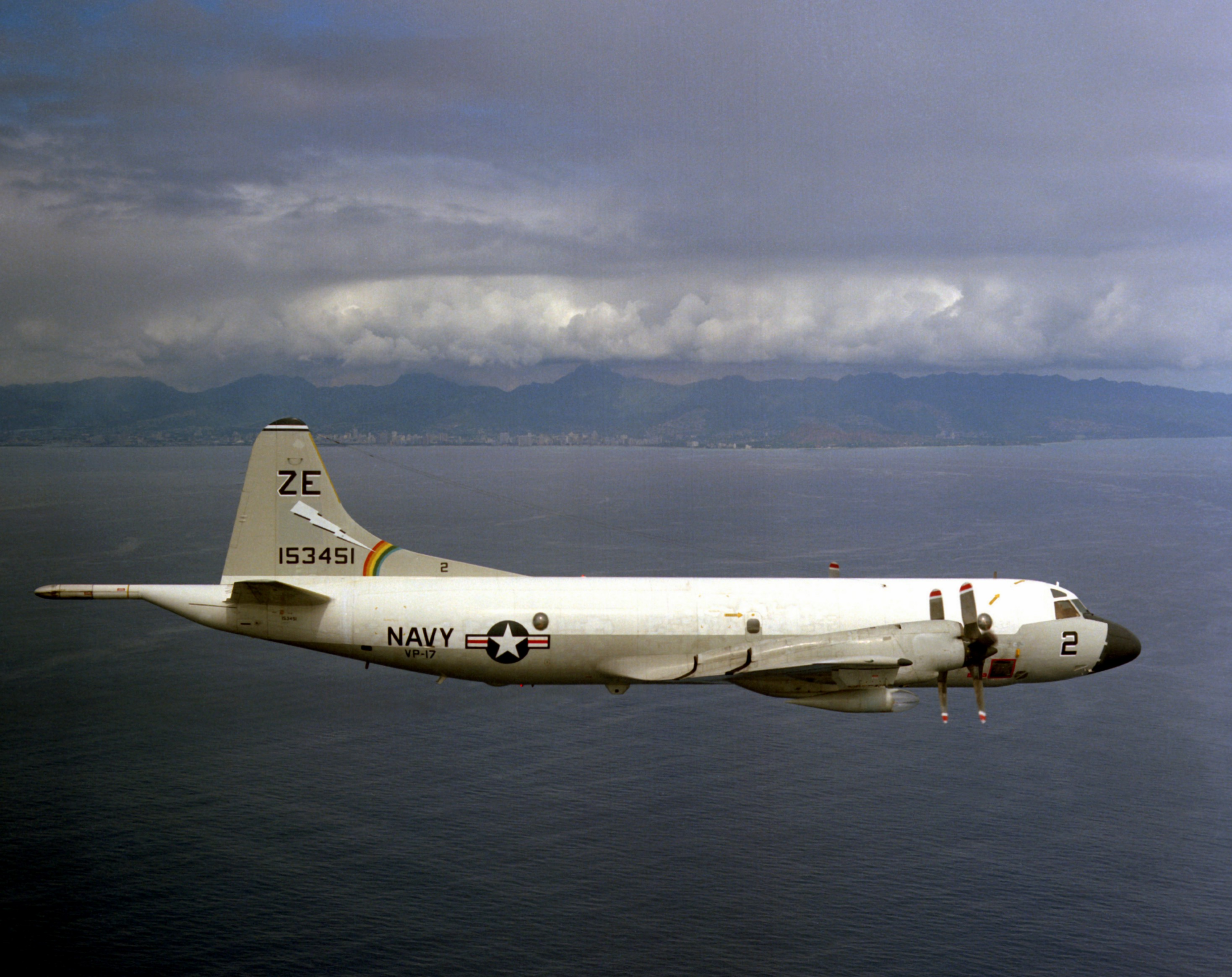
A P-3B from VP-17 off Oahu, in 1976.

- P-3B: Second main production version/series T56-A14 engines in lieu of T56-A10W engines on P-3A.
- P-3AM: Modification to P-3B model for the Brazilian Air Force. Twelve aircraft with EADS/CASA avionics, with deliveries to the Brazilian AF beginning on 3 December 2010.
- EP-3B: Three P-3As were obtained by the Central Intelligence Agency (CIA) from the United States Navy (USN) under Project STSPIN in May 1963, as the replacement aircraft for the CIA's own covert-operations fleet of RB-69As and P2V-7Us. Converted by Aerosystems Division of LTV at Greenville, Texas, the three P-3As were simply known as "black" P-3A under Project Axial. Officially transferred from the USN to the CIA on June/July 1964, LTV Aerosystems converted the three aircraft to be both ELINT and COMINT platforms. The first arrived in Taiwan and was officially transferred to the Republic of China Air Force (ROCAF) top secret "Black Bat" Squadron on 22 June 1966. Armed with four AIM-9 Sidewinder short range AAM missiles for self-defense, the three "black" P-3As flew peripheral missions along the China coast to collect SIGINT and air samples. When the project was terminated in January 1967, they were flown to NAS Alameda, California, for long term storage. Two of the three aircraft were converted as the only EP-3B examples by Lockheed at Burbank in September 1967, while the third aircraft was converted by Lockheed in 1969–1970 to serve as a development aircraft for various electronic programs. The two EP-3Bs were known as "Bat Rack", owing to their short period of service with Taiwan's "Black Bat" Squadron, and were issued to the USN's VQ-1 Squadron in 1969 and deployed to Da Nang Air Base, Vietnam. Later, the two EP-3Bs were converted to EP-3E ARIES, along with ten EP-3As. The twelve EP-3Es were retired in the 1980s, when replaced by an equivalent number of EP-3E ARIES II aircraft.
- NP-3B: One P-3B converted into a testbed, for the U.S. Naval Research Laboratory.

== P-3C and variants ==
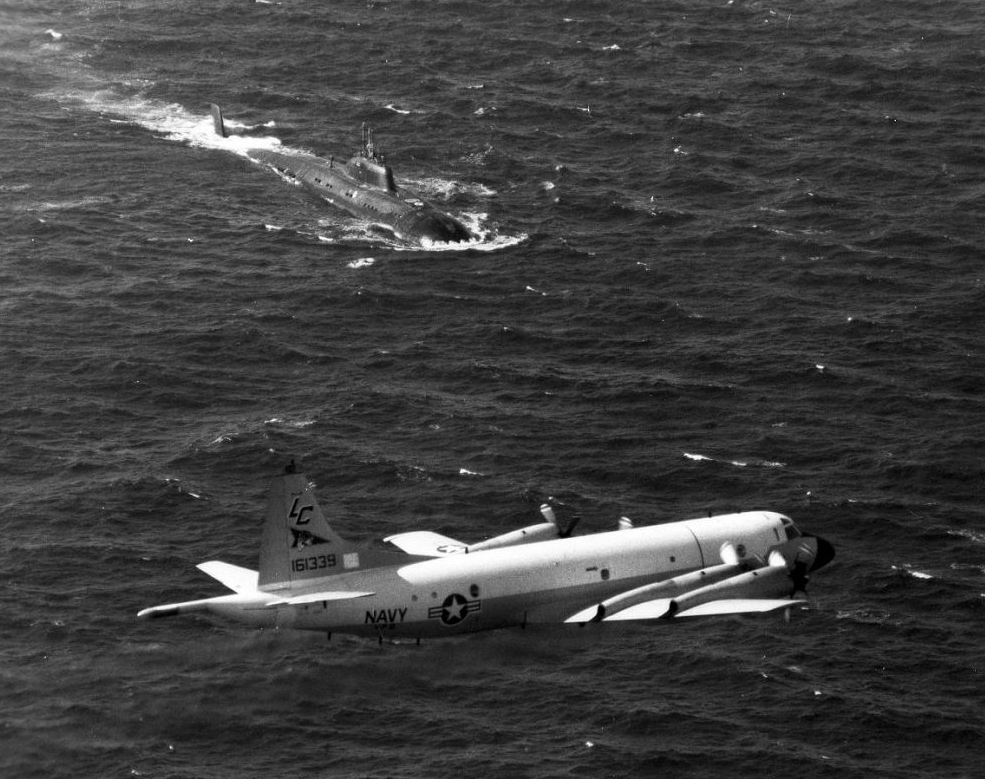
A VP-8 P-3C shadowing a Soviet Victor-class submarine, 1985.

- P-3C: Third main production version/series. T56-A14 engines. The P-3C had a new ASW suite and mission computer with a revised internal layout. Externally the P-3C featured electrically operated entry ladder; small fin-top antenna; externally loaded belly sonobuoy chutes; and three small windows on the aft right side (one window forward of the overwing emergency exit and two well aft). Initial production aircraft had a nose camera located on the lower part of the radome. Later production aircraft had a retractable IRDS turret in lieu of the nose camera. Beginning in the early 1980s existing camera-equipped noses were retrofitted with IRDS turrets. Early models were also known as P-3C "Baseline" or Non-Update (NUD) aircraft. All aircraft were later retrofitted with dual LTN-72 inertial navigation systems.
  - P-3C Update I: New and improved avionics, 31 built.
  - P-3C Update II: With infra-red detection system (IRDS), sonobuoy reference system (SRS), and ability to carry the AGM-84 Harpoon anti-ship missile; 44 built.
  - P-3C Update II.5: 24 aircraft with more reliable LTN-72 inertial navigation system and enhanced communications equipment.
  - P-3C Update III: 50 new-build aircraft incorporating systems of Update II and Update II.5 with new acoustic processor, sonobuoy receiver, plasma displays, OMEGA navigation and improved auxiliary power unit (APU).
  - P-3C SUDS (Sensor Update System) (US): retrofit of selected NUD, UDI, UDII an UDIII aircraft to UDIII acoustic processor and other avionics standard; NUD and UDI aircraft modified under SUDS were not retrofitted with SRS
  - P-3C Update IV: P-3C with Boeing Update 4 avionics suite. Update 4 was intended to be the common avionics suite for the P-3C aircraft and its planned replacement, the Lockheed P-7, which never made it to production. One P-3C was converted to the UD4 interior and that aircraft was later stripped and turned into a Special Mission aircraft.
  - P-3C AIP (Anti-Surface Warfare Improvement Program) (US): P-3C Update III with interior modification to add ASQ-222 mission computer, ASQ-78A/B acoustics system, and APS-137 ISAR radar; OMEGA navigation system replaced with Global Positioning System (GPS) and TADIL-J/Link 16 data link system added
  - P-3C UIP (Upgrade Improvement Program) (RNoAF): P-3C with interior modification to add ASQ-222 mission computer, ASQ-78A/B acoustics system, APS-137 ISAR radar
  - P-3C BMUP (Update III Block Modification Upgrade Program) (US): 25 aircraft with interior modification to convert selected NUD/SUDS, UD2/SUDS and UD2.5/SUDS to carry ASQ-227 mission computer and ASQ-78B acoustics suite
  - P-3C CDU (Counter Drug Update) (US): Aircraft modified with an AN/APG-66 radar and an AN/AVX-1 electro optical sensor for counter drug operations in support of USCG.
  - P-3C CUP (Capability Upkeep Program) (RNLN): P-3C with interior modification to convert UD2.5 to carry ASQ-227 mission computer and ASQ-78B acoustics suite; all aircraft relinquished by Royal Netherlands Navy in 2005 due to defense budget cuts and subsequently sold to/operated by the German Navy (eight aircraft) and the Portuguese Air Force (five aircraft)
  - P-3CK - upgraded and modernized ex-USN P-3B acquired by Republic of Korea Navy

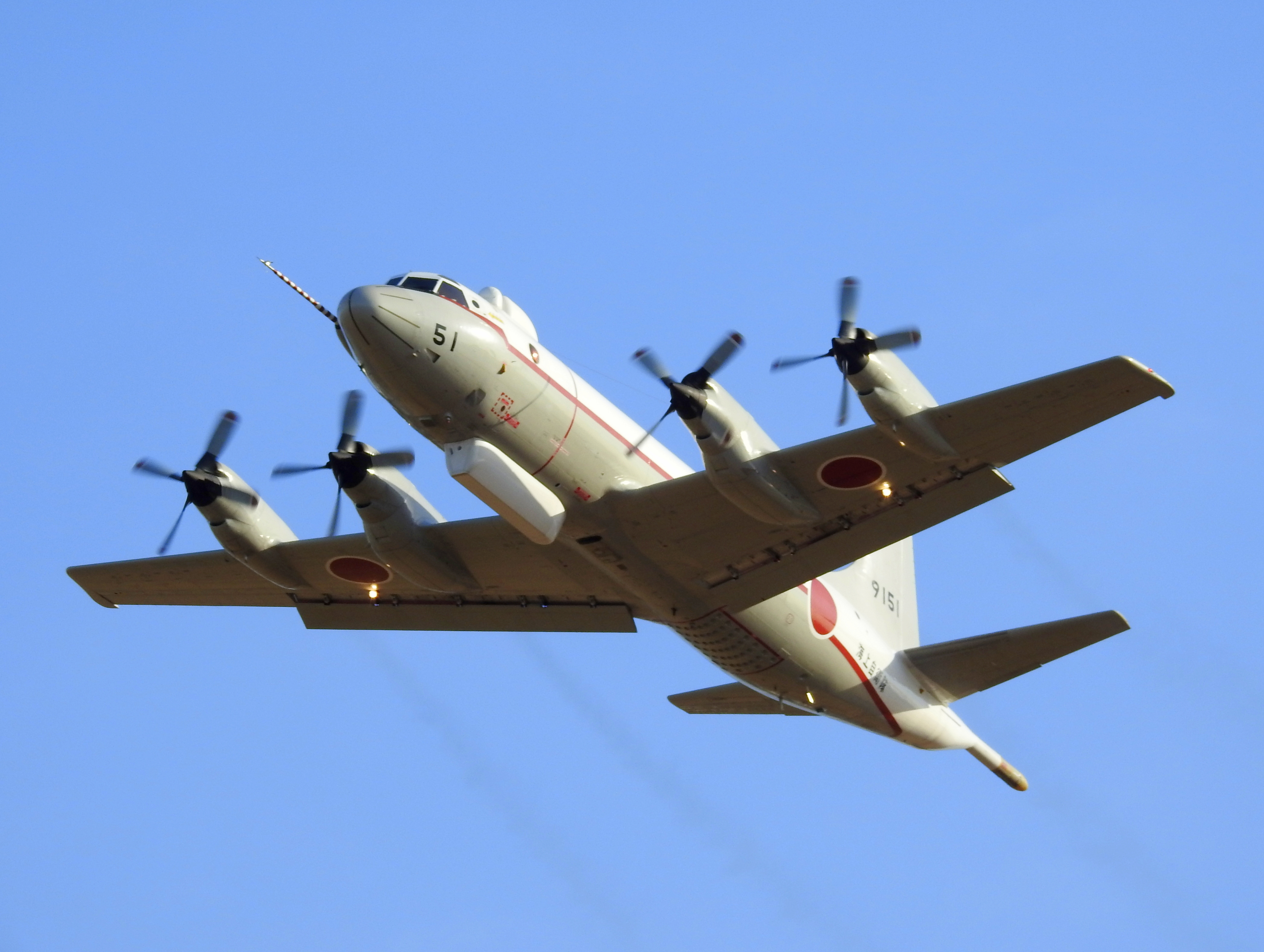
The sole Japan Maritime Self-Defense Force Lockheed UP-3C Orion #9151

- EP-3: ELINT aircraft for the Japan Maritime Self-Defense Force. Not to be confused with EP-3E ARIES, EP-3E ARIES II or EP-3J operated by the USN
- NP-3C/NP-3D: One P-3C converted into an NP-3C test bed for the U.S. Naval Research Laboratory, with extant RP-3C and RP-3D later converted to NP-3D standard. Two additional P-3A also modified to NP-3D for Pacific Missile Test Center, but differing from other example with addition of Extended Area Test System Radar (EATS) incorporated into vertical stabilizer.
- RP-3A/RP-3C/RP-3D: Three modified P-3As with two later modified to RP-3D standard for oceanographic research in support of the United States Naval Research Laboratory; one P-3C modified to replace third RP-3A. All aircraft later converted to NP-3D standard.
- OP-3C: Ten P-3Cs converted to reconnaissance aircraft for the Japan Maritime Self-Defense Force.
- UP-3C: One equipment testing aircraft for the Japan Maritime Self-Defense Force.

== UP-3D ==
ELINT training aircraft for the Japanese Maritime Self-Defense Force.

== RP-3D ==
One P-3C modified on production line to optimize MAD capabilities. The aircraft did extensive geomagnetic surveys under Project Magnet. In 1973, the RP-3D was instrumental in pinpointing the wreckage of Civil War ironclad USS Monitor.

== WP-3D ==
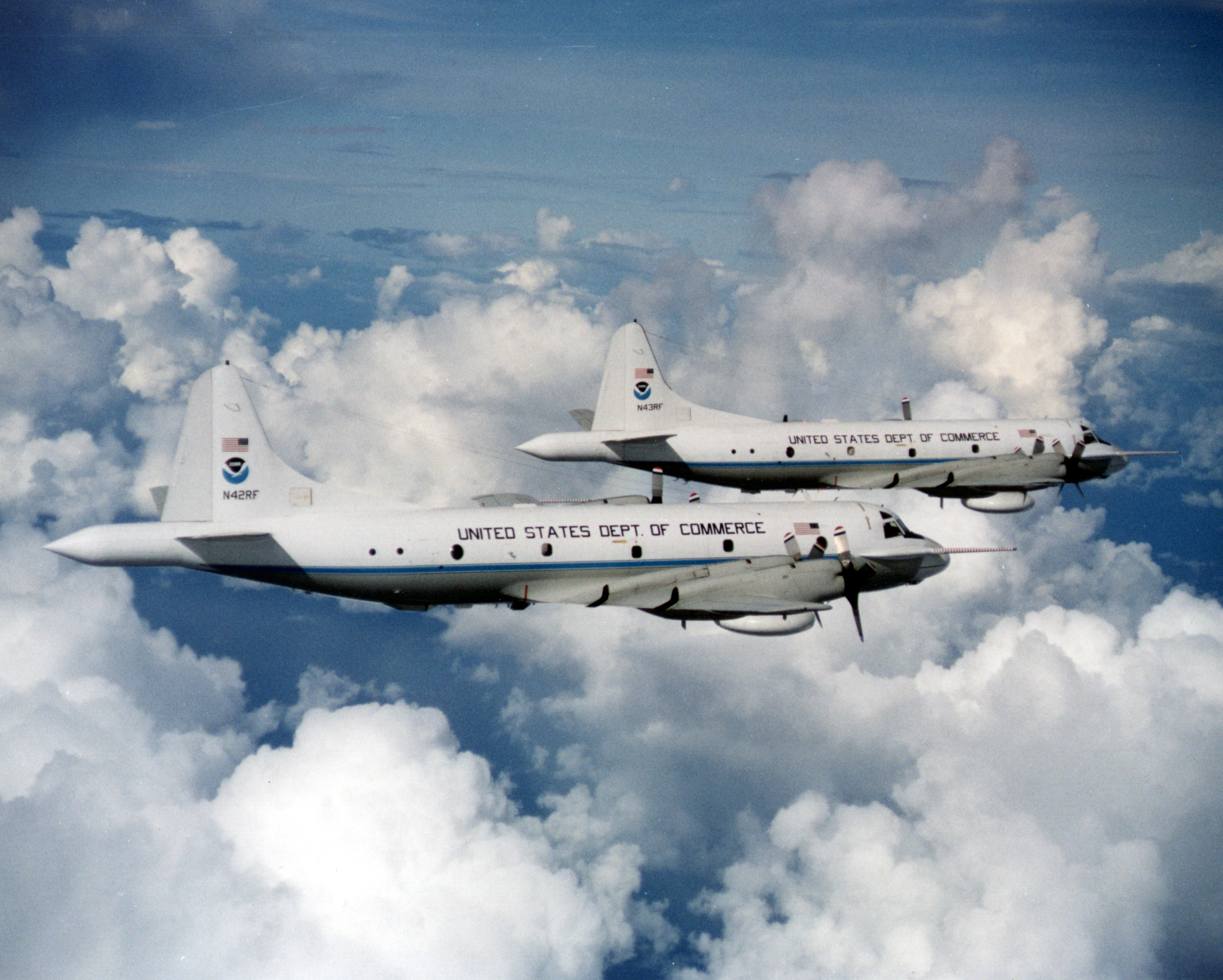
NOAA WP-3D Hurricane Hunters

The Lockheed WP-3D Orion is a production line variant of the P-3 Orion used by the Aircraft Operations Center division of the National Oceanic and Atmospheric Administration (NOAA) at Lakeland Linder International Airport, Florida. Only two of these craft exist, each incorporating numerous features for the role of collecting weather information. During hurricane season, the WP-3Ds are deployed for duty as hurricane hunters.

== EP-3E Aries & Aries II ==
10 P-3A and 2 EP-3B aircraft converted into ELINT aircraft.

The EP-3E Aries II are 12 P-3C aircraft converted into ELINT aircraft.

== EP-3E SIGINT ==
Eight US Navy EP-3E aircraft are to be converted by L-3 Communications Integrated Systems into "surge configuration" Signals Intelligence aircraft. This will expand their multi-source intelligence capacity to meet the increased intelligence demands of the "surge" in counter-terrorism operations.

== NP-3E ==
Various aircraft used for tests.

== P-3F ==
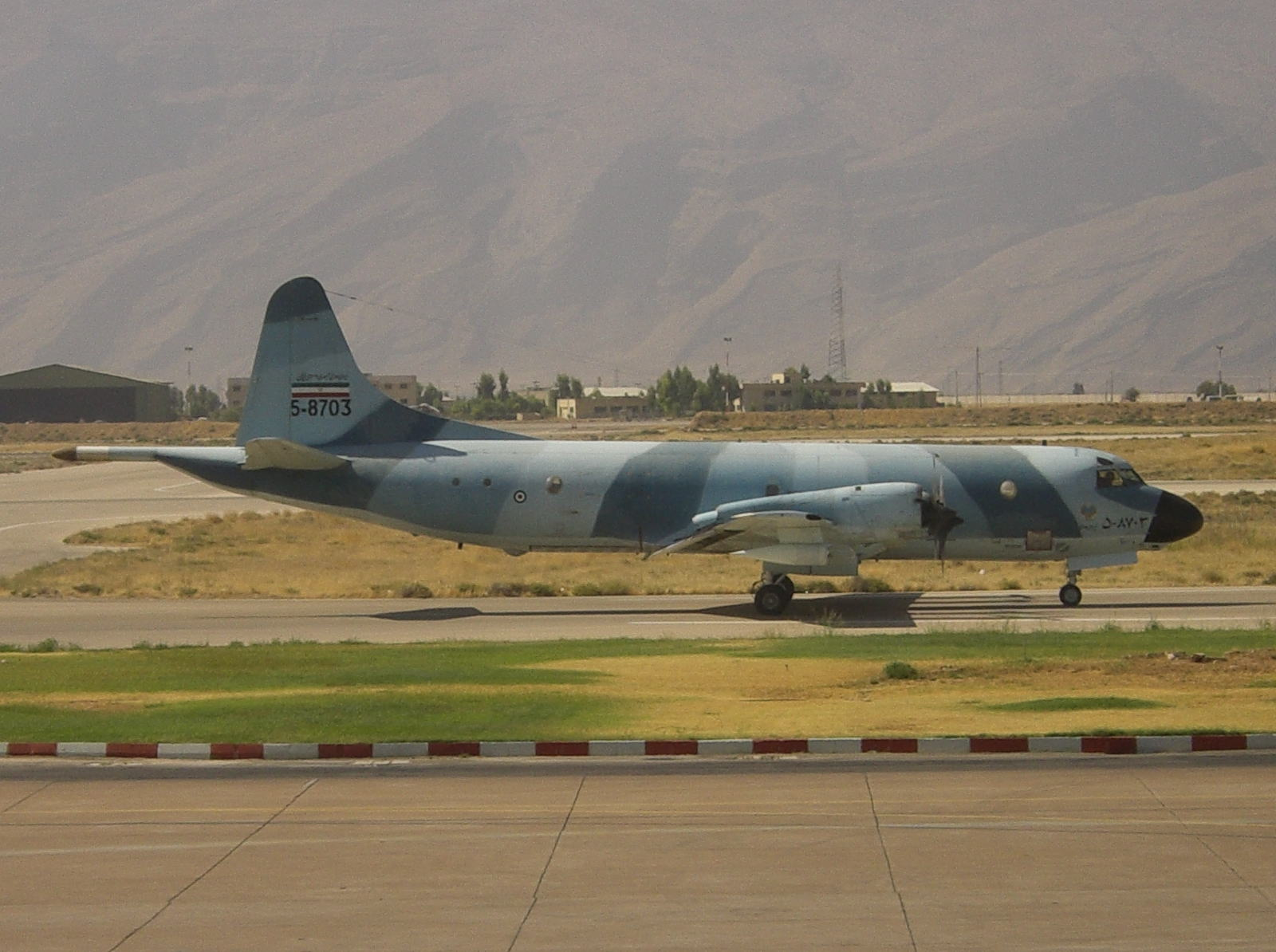
A Lockheed P-3F Orion of the Islamic Republic of Iran Air Force (s/n 5-8703), at Shiraz Int'l Airport in 2007.

Six P-3F Orions delivered to the former Imperial Iranian Air Force in the late 1970s.

The airframe of the P-3F was based on the P-3C, which was the then-current production variant of the P-3 for the USN. Unlike production model P-3Cs and CP-140/140As, the P-3F lacked the small fin-top UHF antenna. The P-3F did not have the ASW suite or mission computer of the P-3C and most of the displays and processors were adapted from the older P-3A and P-3B (although the P-3F had the APS-115 radar of the P-3C). The P-3Fs came from the factory with the then-standard gray and white U.S Navy paint scheme, but while crews were undergoing training in the US, the aircraft were repainted in a unique three-tone blue paint scheme.

Three aircraft are still operational with the Islamic Republic of Iran Air Force (IRIAF).

== P-3G ==
Original designation of what became the Lockheed P-7.

== P-3H ==
Proposed P-3C upgrade with Update IV avionics and survivability upgrades, proposed in the wake of the cancellation of the P-7 and using some of that aircraft's airframe and systems.

== EP-3J ==
Two P-3A aircraft modified for FEWSG use as a simulated adversary EW platform in exercises; later transferred from FEWSG to the former Tactical Electronic Warfare Squadron Thirty-Three (VAQ-33) at NAS Key West, Florida, providing adversary electronic warfare services for Fleet training. Upon disbandment of VAQ-33, the aircraft were transferred to Patrol Squadron 66 at NAS Willow Grove and 2 years later to the newly commissioned Fleet Air Reconnaissance Squadron Eleven (VQ-11) of the Navy Reserve at NAS Brunswick, Maine, continuing the previous role of VAQ-33. The aircraft were retired at the disbandment of VQ-11 as part of a post-Cold War force reduction of the Naval Air Reserve.

== P-3K & P-3K2 ==
Five aircraft originally of P-3B standard but subsequently updated, delivered to New Zealand in 1965–67, replacing Short Sunderlands. The original P-3B aircraft were operated by No. 5 Squadron RNZAF from Whenuapai, Auckland. These received part of the P-3C Update II package and some local innovations, then being designated P-3K (for Kiwi), together with a P-3B purchased second hand from the Royal Australian Air Force and brought up to P-3K standard.

P-3K2: Upgraded P-3K, all 6 aircraft were re-winged and underwent a further round of avionics and sensor updates in 2005. In January 2023 all six aircraft were retired, having been replaced with four Boeing P-8 Poseidon aircraft.

== P-3M ==
Five former Royal Norwegian Air Force (RNoAF) P-3B modernized by EADS-CASA for the Spanish AF. They have a new sensor suite integrated by a six console EADS-CASA Fully Integrated Tactical System (FITS)data system. New sensors include an Elta-2022 radar, SPAS-16 acoustic processor, new 99-channel sonobuoy receiver and AMES-C ESM system. Only the original MAD system was kept.

== P-3N ==
Two P-3B modified for coast guard missions for the RNoAF.

== P-3P ==
Six ex-Royal Australian Air Force aircraft originally of P-3B standard but subsequently updated for the Portuguese Air Force. Being replaced by newer P-3C Update II.5s (P-3C CUP) formerly operated by the Royal Netherlands Navy.

== P-3T & VP-3T ==
The P-3T consists of two former USN P-3As modified for the Royal Thai Navy.

The VP-3T is a single former USN P-3A modified for Royal Thai Navy VIP use and some surveillance operations.

== P-3W ==
Designation used internally by the RAAF to distinguish the first 10 P-3C aircraft procured in the P-3C Update 2 configuration (1978–79) from the second 10 aircraft which were procured in the Update 2.5 configuration (1982–83). The older aircraft were designated as P-3C and the newer aircraft P-3W. All were equipped with the British AQS-901 Acoustics Processor. Eventually with various system upgrades to the mission systems the two types merged into one and they are now all known as AP-3C.

== AP-3C & TAP-3C ==
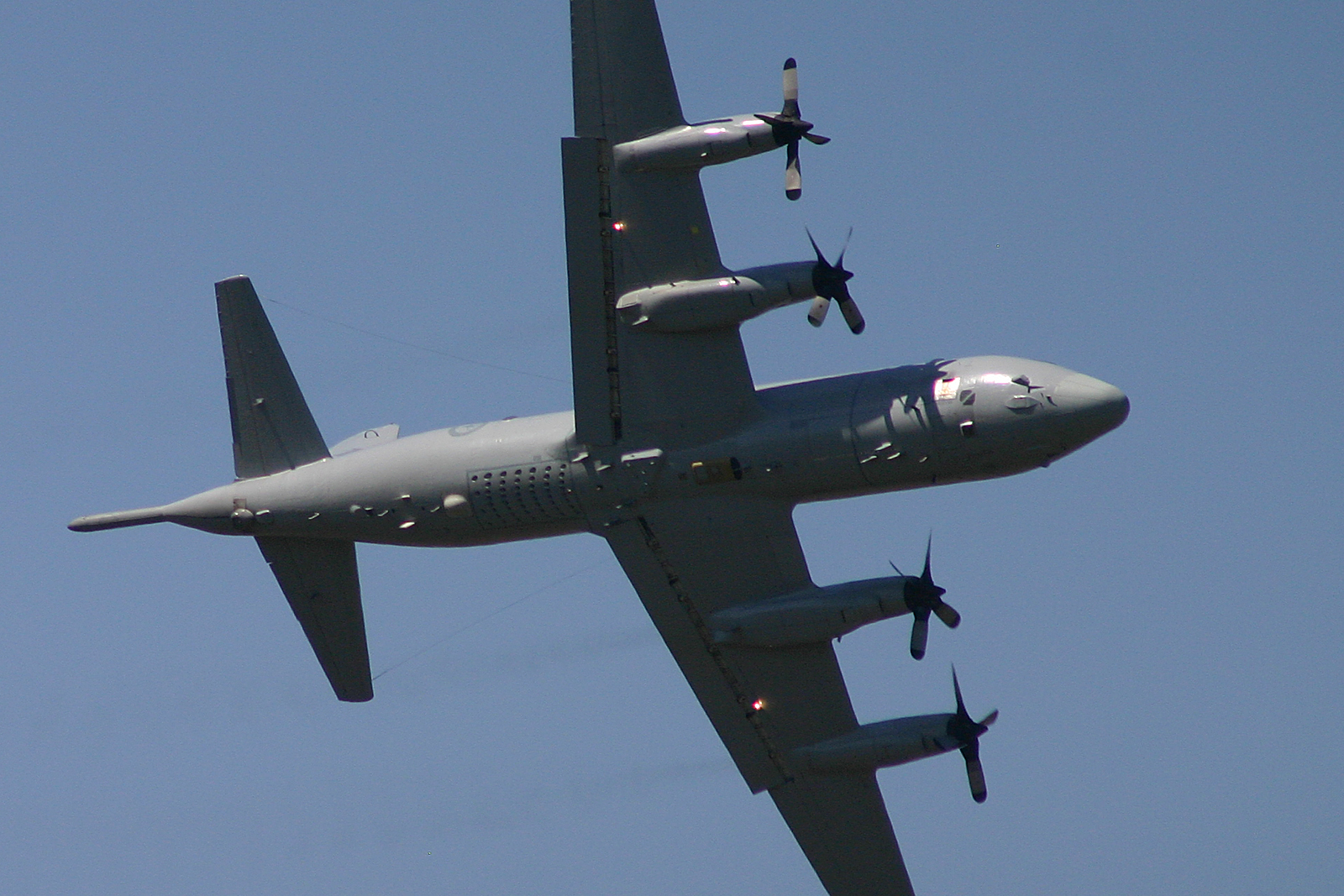
The underbelly of an AP-3C

The Lockheed AP-3C Orion is a variant of the P-3 Orion used by the Royal Australian Air Force (RAAF) for tasks such as naval fleet support, maritime surveillance, search and survivor supply and anti-surface and anti-submarine warfare. They are fitted with a variety of sensors. They include digital multi-mode radar, electronic support measures, electro-optics detectors (infra-red and visual), magnetic anomaly detectors, identification friend or foe systems, and acoustic detectors. The 18 AP-3C Orions were upgraded from P-3Cs between 1997 and 2005, with the program taking three years longer than expected due to systems integration problems. All 18 AP-3C Orions are operated by No. 92 Wing which is based at RAAF Base Edinburgh in South Australia. Aircraft from the wing have seen service as part of Australian Defence Force operations in Australia, South East Asia and the Middle East.

All Royal Australian Air Force P-3C/W aircraft which have been fully upgraded with totally new mission systems by L-3 Communications to include an Elta SAR/ISAR RADAR and a GD-Canada Acoustic Processor system.

The TAP-3 is 3 modified B-models for training duties with the Royal Australian Air Force, with all the ASW gear removed and passenger seating installed. Removed from service with the full introduction into service of the AP-3C Simulator. Designator reflected them as being 'Training Australian P-3'

Five AP-3Cs were purchased by MHD-ROCKLAND in 2018. The aircraft are on the US FAA registry as type 285D, and are based in Keystone Heights, FL.

== P-3CK ==
Designation of the eight former USN P-3B TACNAVMOD aircraft that the Republic of Korea Navy procured from the USN and which are in the process of being rebuilt with P-3C configuration wings and fitted with updated Mission System Equipment by Korea Aerospace Industries and L-3 Communications. These use the Vpx ENhanced Open architecture Multi-static(VENOM) acoustic processor system instead of the AN/USQ-78B installed in the aircraft of the United States and trusted allies.

== P-3 AEW&C ==
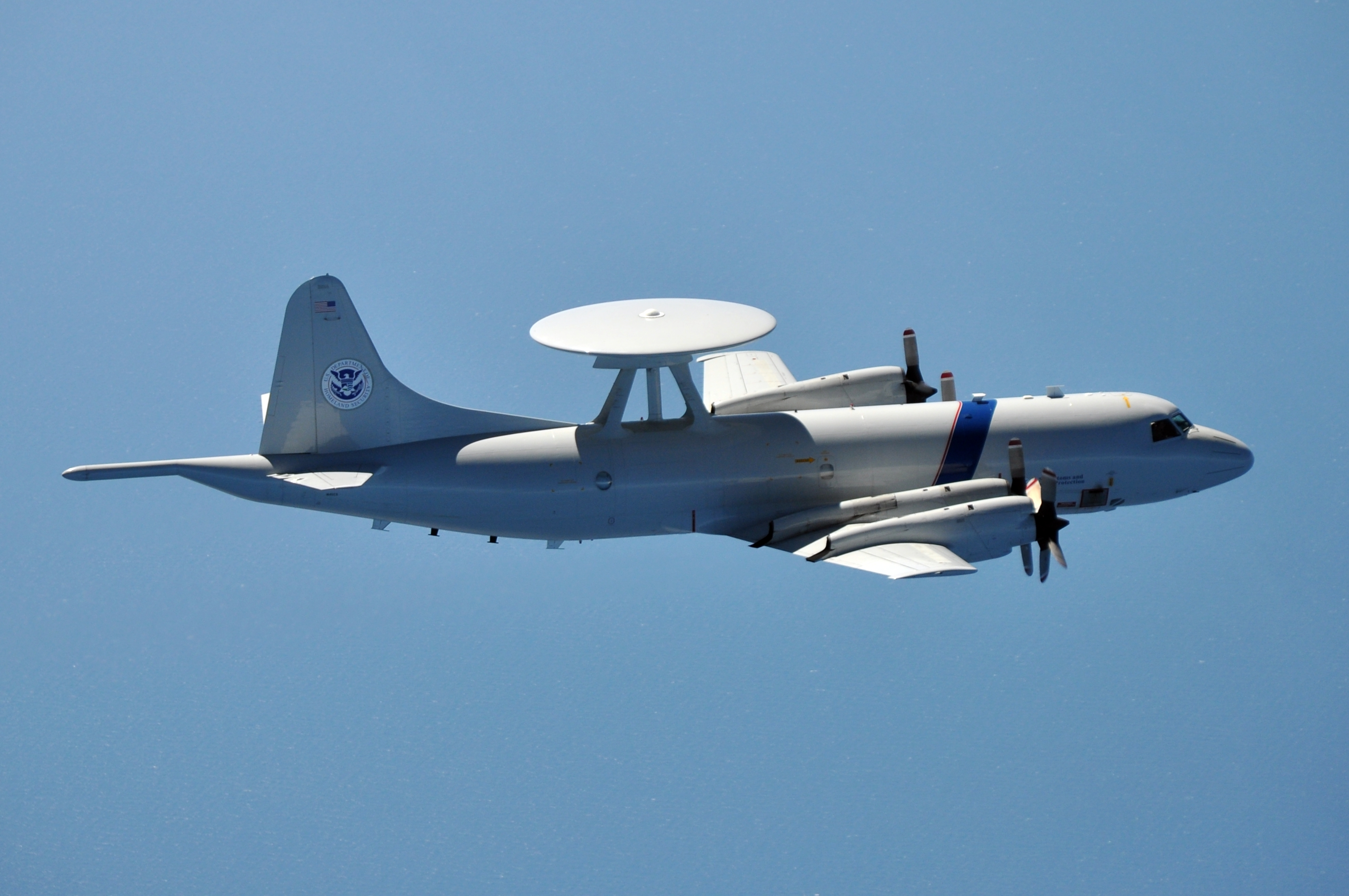
U.S. Department of Homeland Security P-3AEW&C to track drug couriers

Originally nicknamed "Sentinel". Eight P-3B aircraft were converted into Airborne Early Warning and Control aircraft. In the early 90s, "Control" was dropped from the official designation along with the corresponding "C", renaming the model "P-3-AEW". This made it more easily differentiated from the E-3-AWACS operated by the U.S.Air Force. The P-3-AEWs are used by U.S. Customs and Border Protection's Air and Marine Operations for drug interdiction and homeland security missions. "P-3-LRT" (Long Range Tracker), previously known as "Slicks", also operated by CBP, are modified P-3 aircraft with an optical sensor turret in the nose and tracking radar which often work with the AEW ships. The mission using both types of aircraft in a single mission is called "Double Eagle".

== CP-140 Aurora & CP-140A Arcturus ==
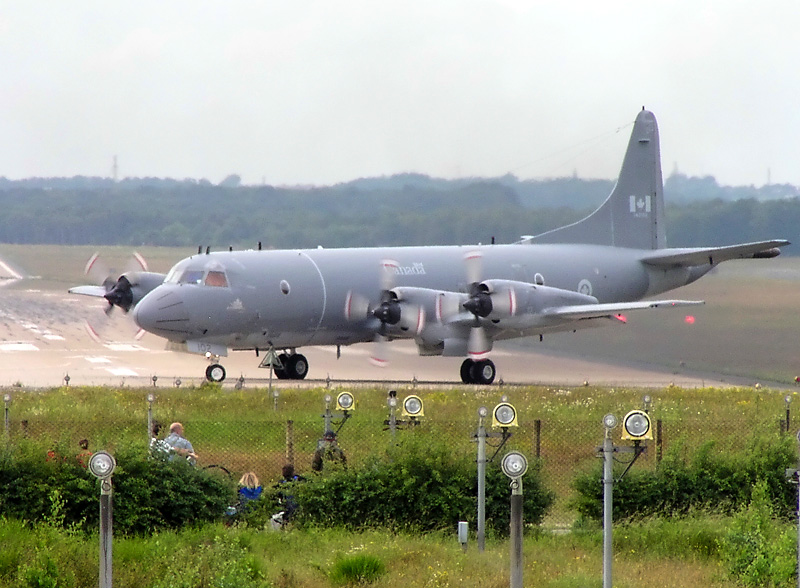
Canadian CP-140 Aurora in June 2007

The Lockheed CP-140 Aurora is a Royal Canadian Air Force maritime patrol aircraft (MPA). The aircraft is based on the P-3 Orion airframe, but mounts the electronics suite of the Lockheed S-3 Viking. In Greek mythology, Aurora is the Greek goddess who restored Orion's eyesight, and the Aurora Borealis are the "northern lights" that are prominent over northern Canada and the Arctic Ocean. Eighteen were built.

The CP-140A Arcturus is a related variant used primarily for pilot training and coastal surface patrol missions. It is not equipped with ASW equipment. Three were built.

== P-7 ==
The Lockheed P-7 was a four turboprop-engined patrol aircraft ordered by the US Navy as a replacement for the P-3 Orion. The external configuration of the aircraft was to be very similar to that of the P-3. Development had not progressed very much before the program was cancelled in the early 1990s, as a cost-cutting measure following the end of the Cold War.

== Orion 21 ==
Proposed new-build and improved variant as a P-3 Orion replacement; lost to the Boeing P-8 Poseidon.

== See also ==
- List of military aircraft of the United States
