= T-stage =

Term for a compressor in certain aircraft engines in the UK

T-stage is a British term for a compressor used in a particular concept for a variable cycle combat engine. The T-stage is part of the HP rotor in this concept.

A US concept for a variable cycle combat engine also uses a similar compressor arrangement as part of the HP rotor. It is called a core driven fan stage (CDFS) by General Electric Aviation in their Variable Cycle Engine (VCE) which ran in 1981.

Alternative concepts including an LP driven stage are shown in the US patent "Variable Cycle Gas Turbine Engines" filed in 1975.
