= General Electric GE38 =

Gas turbine

GE38 / T408
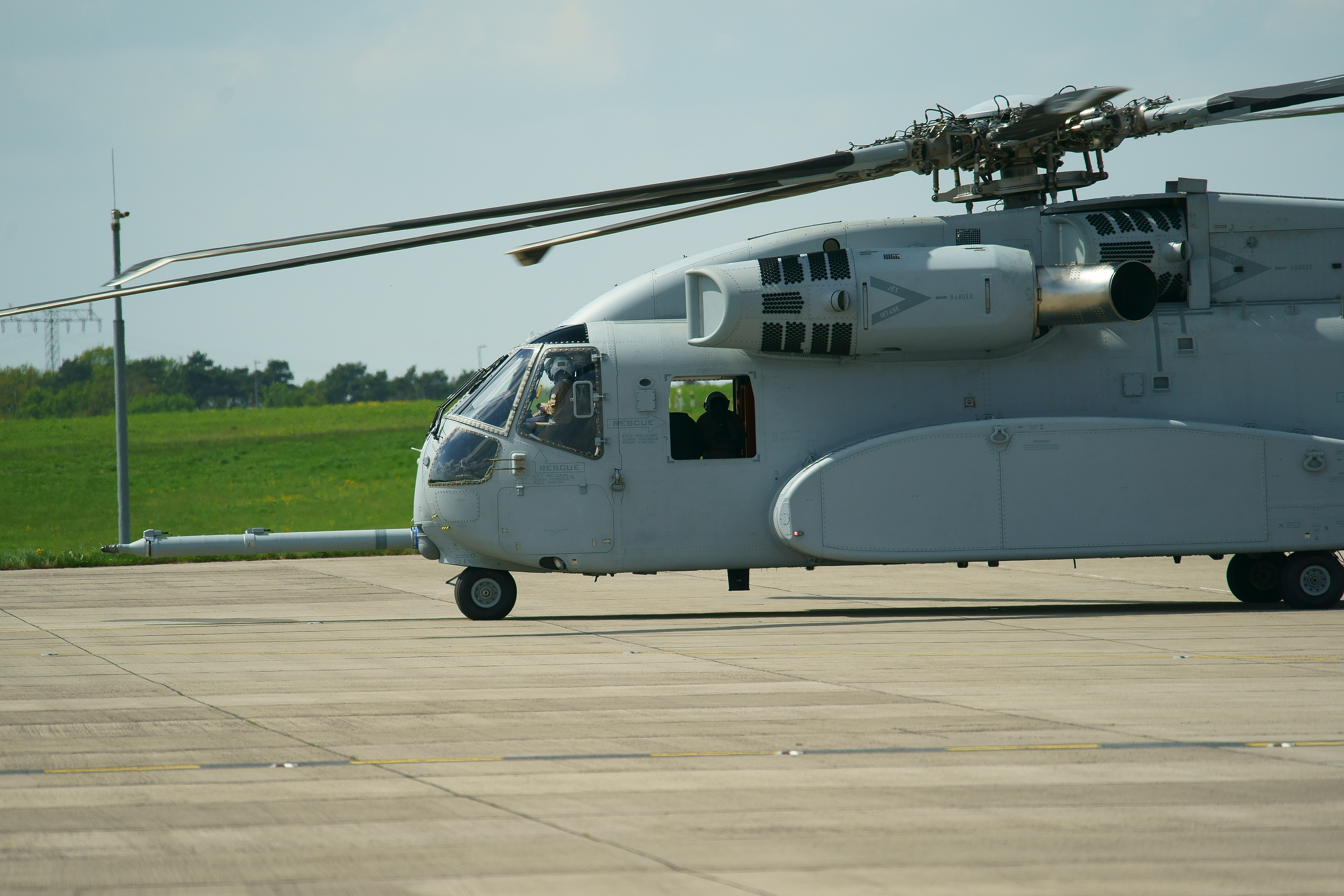
- The T408 on a CH-53K King Stallion
- Type: Turboshaft
- National origin: United States
- Manufacturer: GE Aviation
- First run: December 26, 1989
- Major applications: Sikorsky CH-53K King Stallion (T408)
- Developed into: CFE CFE738

The General Electric GE38 is a gas turbine developed by GE Aviation for turboprop and turboshaft applications. It powers the Sikorsky CH-53K King Stallion as the T408.

== Design and development ==
The GE27 was developed in the early 1980s under the "Modern Technology Demonstrator Engines" (MTDE) program sponsored by the United States Army Aviation Applied Technology Directorate. Sporting a 22:1 pressure ratio, which was a record for single-spool compressors at the time, the GE27 was GE's unsuccessful submission to power the Bell Boeing V-22 Osprey tiltrotor aircraft. The GE27 also had a compressor air flow of 27–28 pounds per second (12–13 kg/s) and a turbine temperature of 2,400–2,500 °F (1,320–1,370 °C; 2,860–2,960 °R; 1,590–1,640 K). The GE27 first ran in late 1984, but it unexpectedly lost the V-22 engine competition to the Allison 501-M80C, which was not a participant in the MTDE program.

In the late 1980s, GE used the GE27 as the basis for the commercial development of turboshafts, turboprops, turbofans, and propfans under the GE38 name. GE formed a 50/50 venture with Garrett (then a division of AlliedSignal) to develop the turbofan variant called the CFE (Commercial Fan Engines) CFE738, which used the GE27's gas generator core. One of a range of advertised GE38 unducted fan (UDF) sizes, the 9,620 lbf (4,360 kgf; 42.8 kN) takeoff thrust GE38-B5 was for a time the baseline engine for the West German-Chinese MPC 75 regional airliner. The GE38 became the T407 military turboprop in partnership with Lycoming Engines for the Lockheed P-7A, with a maximum takeoff power of 6,000 shp (4,475 kW). First run on December 26, 1989, the T407 engine was scheduled to undergo flight testing on a Lockheed P-3 Orion testbed aircraft in the summer of 1990, but the US Navy canceled Lockheed's P-7 contract on July 20, 1990. The commercial version of the T407 was the GLC38 (General Electric/Lycoming Commercial 38), which was unsuccessfully offered for several turboprop airliners in the late 1980s and early 1990s.

The new T408 (GE38-1B) is slated to power the new Sikorsky CH-53K King Stallion three-engined helicopter for the US Marine Corps. It has a power rating of 7,500 shp. The GE38 completed its first round of ground testing in May 2010. Two test engines have completed over 1,000 hours of ground testing by November 2011. Five test engines will be used in the 5,000-hour test program. In September 2019, GE delivered the first production T408 engine to the U.S. Naval Air Systems Command (NAVAIR) for the CH-53K. GE also offered the engine to power the U.S. Navy's Ship-to-Shore Connector air-cushioned landing craft.

The T408 was also tested by the U.S. Army and Boeing as an alternative powerplant on an NCH-47D Chinook testbed helicopter. The helicopter configuration was ground tested beginning in late 2019, followed by an initial flight on September 22, 2020. Conclusion of the test trials was announced on May 12, 2021.

== Variants ==
T407-GE-400

- Lockheed P-7

T408-GE-400 (GE38-1B)

- Boeing NCH-47D Chinook (flying testbed)
- Sikorsky CH-53K King Stallion

CFE CFE738
Turbofan variant of the T407-GE-400, used on the Dassault Falcon
CPX38
Proposed turboprop engine variant of the GE38-1B
GE38-3
An 8,000 shp (6,000 kW) class derivative engine under consideration by the U.S. military in 2006
GE38-B5
A contra-rotating, ungeared, unducted fan (UDF) derivative with a bare engine weight (including the UDF) of 2,395 lb (1,086 kg), a UDF diameter of 85 inches (2.1 meters), and a blade count of 11 on one propeller and 9 on the other; provides a takeoff thrust of 9,644 lbf (4,374 kgf; 42.90 kN) with a thrust-specific fuel consumption (TSFC) of 0.240 lb/(lbf⋅h) (6.8 g/(kN⋅s)), and a cruise thrust of 2,190 lbf (990 kgf; 9.7 kN) with a TSFC of 0.519 lb/(lbf⋅h) (14.7 g/(kN⋅s)); proposed for the MPC 75 German-Chinese regional airliner in the late 1980s
GLC38
Proposed turboprop variant of the T407-GE-400

== Applications ==
- Boeing NCH-47D Chinook (flying testbed)
- Sikorsky CH-53K King Stallion

== Specifications (T408) ==
Data from GE Aviation.

==== General characteristics ====
- Type: Turboprop/turboshaft
- Length: 57.5 inches (1.46 m)
- Diameter: 27 inches (0.69 m)
- Dry weight: 1,104.7 pounds (501.1 kg)

==== Components ====
- Compressor: 5-stage axial + 1-stage centrifugal HP compressor
- Turbine: 2-stage single crystal cooled HP turbine, 3-stage LP turbine
- Oil system: synthetic

==== Performance ====
- Maximum power output: 7,500 shaft horsepower (5,600 kW)
- Overall pressure ratio: 18.6:1
- Specific fuel consumption: About 0.4 lb/(hp⋅h) (0.24 kg/kWh) (estimated)
- Power-to-weight ratio: 6.8 shp/lb (11.2 kW/kg)

== See also ==
Related development

- CFE CFE738
- General Electric GE36

Comparable engines

- Allison T406
- Honeywell T55
- Pratt & Whitney PW150

Related lists

- List of aircraft engines

== Bibliography ==
- Trimble, Steve (October 14, 2020). "GE tests new FATE engine to offer Army upgraded T408". Aviation Week & Space Technology. ISSN 0005-2175.
- General Electric T408 (PDF). World Power Systems Briefing (Aero). Teal Group Corporation (Report). July 2020. Archived from the original on June 14, 2021.
- Trimble, Stephen (October 29 – November 4, 2013). "The power to go further: GE Aviation's GE38 may have its roots in the 1980s, but the manufacturer sees a wealth of opportunities for the new powerplant above and beyond Sikorsky's CH-53K" (PDF). Military engines. Flight International. No. 5413. pp. 38–39. ISSN 0015-3710. OCLC 5168234935. Archived (PDF) from the original on October 29, 2020.
- "GE developing marine version of engine". Defense News. Lynn, Massachusetts, USA. United Press International (UPI). January 18, 2011.
- Gunston, Bill (2006). World Encyclopedia of Aero Engines, 5th Edition. Phoenix Mill, Gloucestershire, England, UK: Sutton Publishing Limited. p. 79. ISBN 0-7509-4479-X.
- Johnson, Edward T.; Lindsay, Howard (June 11–14, 1990). "Advanced technology programs for small turboshaft engines: Past, present, future" (PDF). Volume 2: Aircraft Engine; Marine; Microturbines and Small Turbomachinery. Gas Turbine and Aeroengine Congress and Exposition. Brussels, Belgium: American Society of Mechanical Engineers (ASME). doi:10.1115/90-GT-267. ISBN 978-0-7918-7905-4. OCLC 8518938641.
