= Unison Industries =

Aircraft component manufacturing company

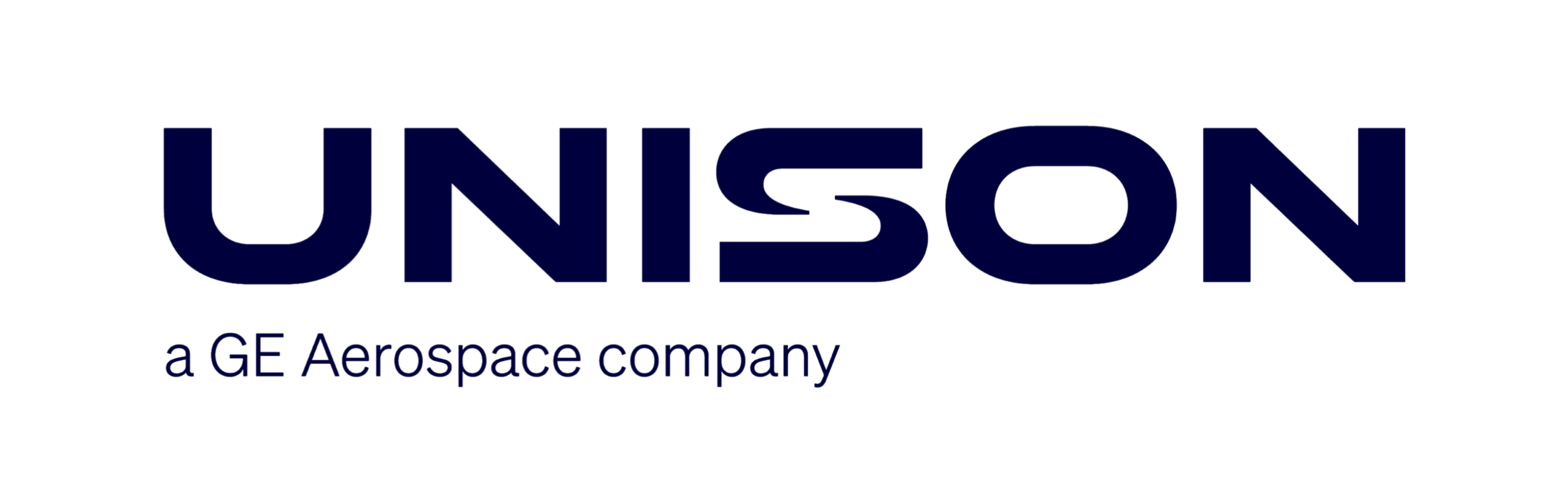
- Type: Subsidiary
- Industry: Aviation & Aerospace
- Founded: 1980
- Headquarters: Jacksonville, Florida, USA
- Number of locations: Dayton, Ohio; Norwich, New York; Saltillo, Mexico
- Key people: Giovanni Spitale, President; John Parish, VP Sales; Ron Barker, CFO; Scott Searles, VP Marketing
- Products: aircraft engine components
- Revenue: $500 million (2007)
- Number of employees: 2,200
- Parent: GE Aerospace
- Website: www.unisonindustries.com

Unison Industries, LLC, headquartered Jacksonville, Florida, is involved in the design, manufacture, and integration of electrical and mechanical components and systems for aircraft engines and airframes.

== History ==
Frederick Sontag holds a B.S. in physics from Harvey Mudd College, an M.S. in physics from the University of Nevada, and an M.B.A. from Harvard Business School. He worked for several corporations during the 1970s before finding himself unemployed.

=== Buyout ===
Sontag invested his life savings in 1980 to secure an $8 million loan for a leveraged buyout of Slick Electro, an aircraft ignition manufacturer in Rockford, Illinois. One of Sontag's first initiatives was to completely redesign the components and materials in the "Slick" products to make them more durable, reliable and easier to maintain. Business was good for several years, but in the mid-1980s, the small airplane market took a nosedive and the company was forced to lay off 180 workers. Sontag dedicated more resources to research and development for better and more diverse products. In 1988, Unison invented the first solid-state ignition system for turbine-powered aircraft, which gave the company notability in the commercial aviation market.

=== Bendix ===
The following year, the company purchased Bendix's aircraft ignition business from the Allied Corporation, which increased Unison's sales 500%. At the time, Bendix was the world leader in ignition systems for turbine aircraft. The Bendix plant was in Jacksonville, Florida.

He relocated the business to Jacksonville, then paid off the original loan and reincorporated it under a new name. The company has one of the highest numbers of engineers in Jacksonville.

=== Goodrich ===
Unison acquired the Engine Electrical Systems Division of BFGoodrich Aerospace in 1997, which added satellite wiring harnesses and space ignition systems to Unison's product line.

=== Westport ===
In April 2000, Unison purchased Westport International, located in Orange, Connecticut. The 45-person center was managed from the Norwich, NY operation. In the Fall of 2001, company officials made the decision to move the operations at Orange to the larger complex at Norwich. It was the first time in company history that Unison had closed a facility.

=== GE ===
In April 2002, after twenty-two years operating as a private entrepreneurial business, Unison became a wholly owned subsidiary of GE Engine Services, Inc., a subsidiary of the GE Transportation division of the General Electric Company. Sontag agreed to remain with the company as a consultant to assist in the transition.

== Operations ==
Unison serves both original equipment manufacturers and aftermarket customers in the general, commercial, and military aviation markets. The company manufactures turbine and piston engine ignition systems, electric power generation and control systems, electrical wiring harnesses and panel assemblies, sensors, switches, and bellows assemblies, tubing, ducting, brackets, flex joints, and air valves.

The company operates several manufacturing facilities and logistics centers worldwide.

The company is a defense contractor, and several of their products are utilized in military applications, including ignition generators for the BGM-109 Tomahawk, which is a cruise missile. They were also involved in the development of the General Electric/Rolls-Royce F136 turbofan engine used in the Lockheed Martin F-35 Lightning II.

=== Incident ===
On January 30, 2006, a cylinder of krypton gas exploded at the company's Jacksonville facility. One person was injured and more than 40 people were exposed to low-level radiation and underwent decontamination procedures.
