= UDC =

UDC may refer to:

== Politics ==
- Central African Democratic Union (French: Union Démocratique Centrafricaine), a political party in the Central African Republic
- Christian Democratic Union (Dominican Republic) (Spanish: Unión Demócrata Cristiana), a former political party in the Dominican Republic
- Christian Democratic Union (Ecuador) (Spanish: Unión Demócrata Cristiana), political party in Ecuador
- Democratic Union of Cameroon (French: Union Démocratique du Cameroun), a political party in Cameroon
- Democratic Union of Catalonia (Catalan: Unió Democràtica de Catalunya), a political party in Spain
- Nicaraguan Christian Democratic Union (Spanish: Unión Demócrata Cristiana), a political party in Nicaragua
- Swiss People's Party (French: Union Démocratique du Centre), a political party in Switzerland
- Union of the Centre (1993), a former political party in Italy
- Union of the Centre (2002), a political party in Italy
- Union of Christian and Centre Democrats (Italian: Unione dei Democratici Cristiani e dei Democratici di Centro), a political party in Italy
- Union of Democratic Control, a British campaigning group set up to oppose the First World War
- Union of the Right and Centre (French: Union de la droite et du centre), an electoral alliance in France
- Umbrella for Democratic Change, a political party in Botswana

== Government ==
- Unified Development Code (also known as a Unified Development Ordinance), a local policy instrument that combines zoning regulations with other desired city regulations
- Urban Development Corporation, a diversified public authority in New York State, United States
- Urban district council, a former level of local authority in England and Wales
- Urban district council, a former level of local authority in Ireland
- Utah Department of Corrections, a government agency dedicated to the management and supervision of convicted felons in the State of Utah, United States
- Uganda Development Corporation, an agency of the Government of Uganda, mandated to promote and facilitate the industrial and economic development of that country

== Education ==
- University of A Coruña (Galician: Universidade da Coruña), a university in A Coruña, Spain
- University of the District of Columbia, a university in Washington, D.C., United States
- University Development Center, an educational-work co-operational program operated by GE Aviation in the United States

== Computing ==
- Utah Data Center, a large data center maintained by the National Security Agency, United States
- Utility Data Center, a Hewlett-Packard product designed to help deploy virtualized resources

== Other uses ==
- UDC Finance, New Zealand finance company
- UDC Homes, an American homebuilder
- United Daughters of the Confederacy, neo-confederate non-profit based in the US
- Universal Decimal Classification, a system of library classification derived from the Dewey Decimal Classification
