= F136 =

F136 may refer to:

- Ferrari F136 engine, a car engine
- General Electric/Rolls-Royce F136, an aircraft engine
