= CFE Company =

The CFE Company is a joint venture established by GE Aviation and the Garrett Engine Division of Allied Signal (now Honeywell Aerospace) in June 1987. The company produces the CFE738, a small turbofan engine used on the Dassault Falcon 2000. "CFE" stands for "Commercial Fan Engines".

== Products ==
- CFE CFE738
