= La-Chun Lindsay =

American aerospace engineer

La-Chun Lindsay OBE
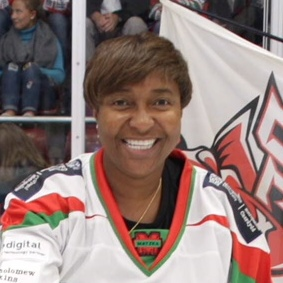
- Born: Rock Hill, South Carolina
- Citizenship: United States of America
- Education: Clemson University
- Scientific career
- Fields: Aerospace Engineering
- Workplaces: GE Aviation

La-Chun Lindsay (pronounced “La-Shon”) is an American aerospace engineer who was the first woman to hold the position of Managing Director of Wales' largest (£3 billion revenue) industrial company, GE Aviation Wales. Lindsay launched GE’s first LGBTQ+ Chapter in Wales as part of her ongoing mission to campaign for LGBT and human rights.

== Early life and education ==
Lindsay was born in the city of Rock Hill in South Carolina. She graduated from Clemson University in 1995, with a B.S in Ceramic Engineering. From January 1992 to August 1994 she worked as a cooperative education student for the Department of Energy at Battelle Laboratory where she developed a "fiber optic coupled system for use in the remote processing of nuclear waste". She also "invented a system to destroy fluorocarbons and halohydrocarbons by reaction with molten aluminum".

== Career ==
After graduating she worked at SELEE Corporation, where she introduced the use of ceramic foam in metal filtration technology. At SELEE, she occupied numerous different roles and led their largest product line. She then joined General Electric Quartz in 1997 as plant manager. Lindsay held a number of roles at General Electric, including Process Engineer, Tubing Green Belt, Supplier Quality Black Belt and Manager of the Sand Processing Plant, before joining the Corporate Audit Staff in 2000. Here, she performed financial, compliance, regulatory and commercial audits, and she was a member of GE's Commercial Council.

In 2007, she became Vice President of Commercial Distribution Finances Field Services Group in GE Capital where she led over 300 remote employees. In 2014, she transitioned to GE Aviation as Plant Leader of Lynn Assembly, Test and Overhaul, where her team grew to over 400, and she was responsible for producing and developing engines for GE Aviation’s military and commercial customers.

In 2015, she became Managing Director for GE Aviation Wales, a company with approximately $3 billion in annual revenues. Lindsay was the first woman to assume a Managing Director position for the company. During Lindsay's leadership, GE Aviation Wales was awarded the contract to service the GE9X jet engine, requiring a £20 million investment in the site, with £5 million pledged by the Welsh Government. Lindsay was a guest speaker at the "Women in the Workplace" event which was held in conjunction with the UEFA Women's Champions League final in Cardiff. Lindsay returned to the United States to work at the GE Aviation headquarters in 2018.

In 2020 Lindsay was appointed the role of Welsh Envoy where she offered in-market support for Welsh export and inward investment ambitions.

== Awards & International recognition ==
- 2016 - 40 Most Influential LGBT People in Wales (4th rank)
- 2017 - 40 Most Influential LGBT People in Wales (2nd rank)
- 2017 - Honorary Fellow at Cardiff University
- 2017 - Honorary Doctorate at the University of South Wales
- 2018 - Honorary degree, College of Engineering, Swansea University
- 2020 - Appointed Welsh Envoy
- 2026 - Appointed an Honorary Officer of the Order of the British Empire (OBE).
- 2026 - Appointed Expert Panelist, Welsh Innovation and Development Agency.

== Diversity efforts ==
La-Chun Lindsay has undertaken high profile events such as chairing a panel on gender equality in Wales at the United Nations. Lindsay was ranked 4th (2016) and 2nd (2017) in the Wales Online ‘Pinc List: The 40 most influential LGBT people in Wales’ for her work in this field.

In 2016, it was claimed that she was the only openly gay executive within the global company of General Electric. During her first two years at GE Aviation Wales, the number of women on the shop floor rose from 1 to 13%. She founded the Wales branch of the GLBTA GE Aviation Alliance, which was developed to attract, develop, and retain gay, lesbian, bisexual, and transgender employees within the company. Since launching GE’s first LGBTQ+ Chapter in Wales it has grown to GE’s largest LGBTQ+ Chapter in the UK.
