= Lockheed P-7 =

1980s cancelled US patrol aircraft project

P-7
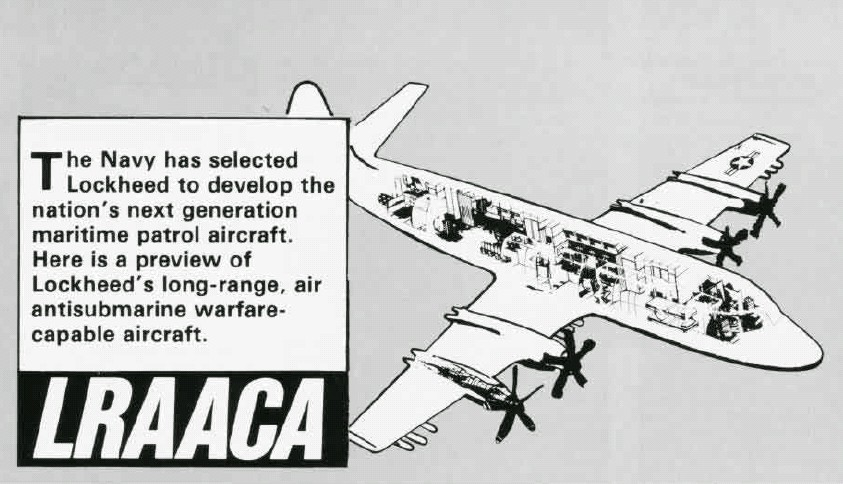
- P-7 LRAACA drawing

General information
- Type: Maritime patrol aircraft
- National origin: United States
- Manufacturer: Lockheed Corporation
- Status: Cancelled
- Number built: None

History
- Developed from: Lockheed P-3 Orion

The Lockheed P-7 was a four turboprop-engined patrol aircraft ordered by the U.S. Navy as a replacement for the P-3 Orion. The external configuration of the aircraft was to be very similar to that of the P-3. Development had not progressed very much before the program was cancelled in July 1990.

== Development ==
In the mid-1980s, the U.S. Navy made plans to replace the large number of Lockheed P-3 aircraft which would reach the end of their useful service lives during the 1990s. To limit costs the U.S. Navy envisioned a modified P-3 with increased payload and updated avionics. This aircraft became known as the "P-3G" of which 125 should be procured over a period of five years up to 2001. However, the U.S. Navy was unwilling to select Lockheed's P-3G without any competition and issued the final "Request for Proposals (RFP)" in January 1987. For the airplane named the P-7A "LRAACA" (Long-Range Air ASW-Capable Aircraft), Lockheed's competitors were:

- Boeing – proposal using a modified 757
- McDonnell Douglas – proposal using a modified MD-90

In October 1988, the U.S. Navy announced that Lockheed won the competition, as the company's proposal was significantly cheaper than that of the competitors. The U.S. Defense Acquisition Board (DAB) recommended a full-scale development of the LRAACA on 4 January 1989. The costs were planned to be about $600 million, with a maximum cost limit of $750 million. However, in November 1989, Lockheed announced a cost overrun of $300 million due to the tight schedule and design problems. On 20 July 1990, the U.S. Navy stopped the P-7A program contract for default, "citing Lockheed's inability to make adequate progress toward completion of all contract phases". The program was finally cancelled by the DAB in late 1990.

== Design ==
The P-7 was designed as an enlarged version of the original P-3C. The fuselage, of similar cross-section to that of the P-3, was lengthened by 2.40 m (8 ft), and the wingspan by 2.10 m (7 ft). The wing center section was increased in length, which moved the engines farther away from the fuselage to reduce noise levels in the cabin. The tailplane was increased by about 25% in area, but shortened in height compared to that of the P-3. The P-7A was to be powered by four General Electric T407-GE-400 turboprops with 5-blade propellers.

Initial plans included the Update IV electronics equipment of the P-3C. The cockpit was to be fitted with eight CRT displays and a stowable HUD for weapons delivery. Other equipment included search radar, MAD, decoy flare launchers, electro-optical detector, radar warning receivers, IR suppression on the engine exhausts and laser deflection screens on the windows. The primary submarine detection sensor was to be the sonobuoy, of which 112 were carried internally; 38 more could be stowed for in flight reloading. Another 150 could be carried in 10 underwing pods.

The design had an internal bomb bay for a maximum of 3,400 kg of weapons and 12 underwing pylons.

== Specifications (P-7A, as designed) ==
General characteristics

- Crew: 13+ (approximate based on seating arrangements)
- Length: 112 ft 8 in (34.34 m)
- Wingspan: 106 ft 7 in (32.49 m)
- Height: 32 ft 11 in (10.03 m)
- Wing area: 1,438 sq ft (133.6 m^{2})
- Empty weight: 105,000 lb (47,627 kg)
- Gross weight: 165,000 lb (74,843 kg)
- Max takeoff weight: 171,350 lb (77,723 kg)
- Powerplant: 4 × General Electric T407 turboprops, 6,000 hp (4,500 kW) each
- Propellers: 5-bladed Hamilton Standard 15WF-5

Performance

- Maximum speed: 410 mph (660 km/h, 360 kn)
- Range: 2,470 mi (3,980 km, 2,150 nmi)
- Power/mass: 0.14 hp/lb (0.24 kW/kg)

== See also ==
Related development

- Lockheed P-3 Orion

Aircraft of comparable role, configuration, and era

- Boeing P-8 Poseidon
- Kawasaki P-1
- McDonnell Douglas P-9D

== Bibliography ==
- United States General Accounting Office (US GAO) (July 17, 1987). "Aircraft requirements: Navy's plans to acquire a new maritime patrol aircraft" (PDF). Letter to Howard L. Berman, United States House of Representatives. OCLC 26925253.
