= University Development Center =

Educational-work co-operational program

A University Development Center (UDC) is an educational-work co-operational program that was founded by Smiths Aerospace in 2005, which was acquired in 2007 by GE Aviation, in Houghton, Michigan. The program employs students from the local Michigan Technological University to work on programs that the company is currently working. This provides real world work experience for future engineers as well as provide cost effective outsourcing for GE Aviation in the United States.

In 2007, the Houghton UDC moved to the once condemned Houghton Power House located near the Houghton/Hancock Lift Bridge. The project was an ambitious one on part of both GE and MTEC SmartZone, with the support of the Michigan Economic Development Corp in excess of 1 million dollars.

Currently one other UDC program has been founded by GE Aviation: Kansas State University in Manhattan, Kansas
