= CFE CFE738 =

Turbofan engine

CFE738
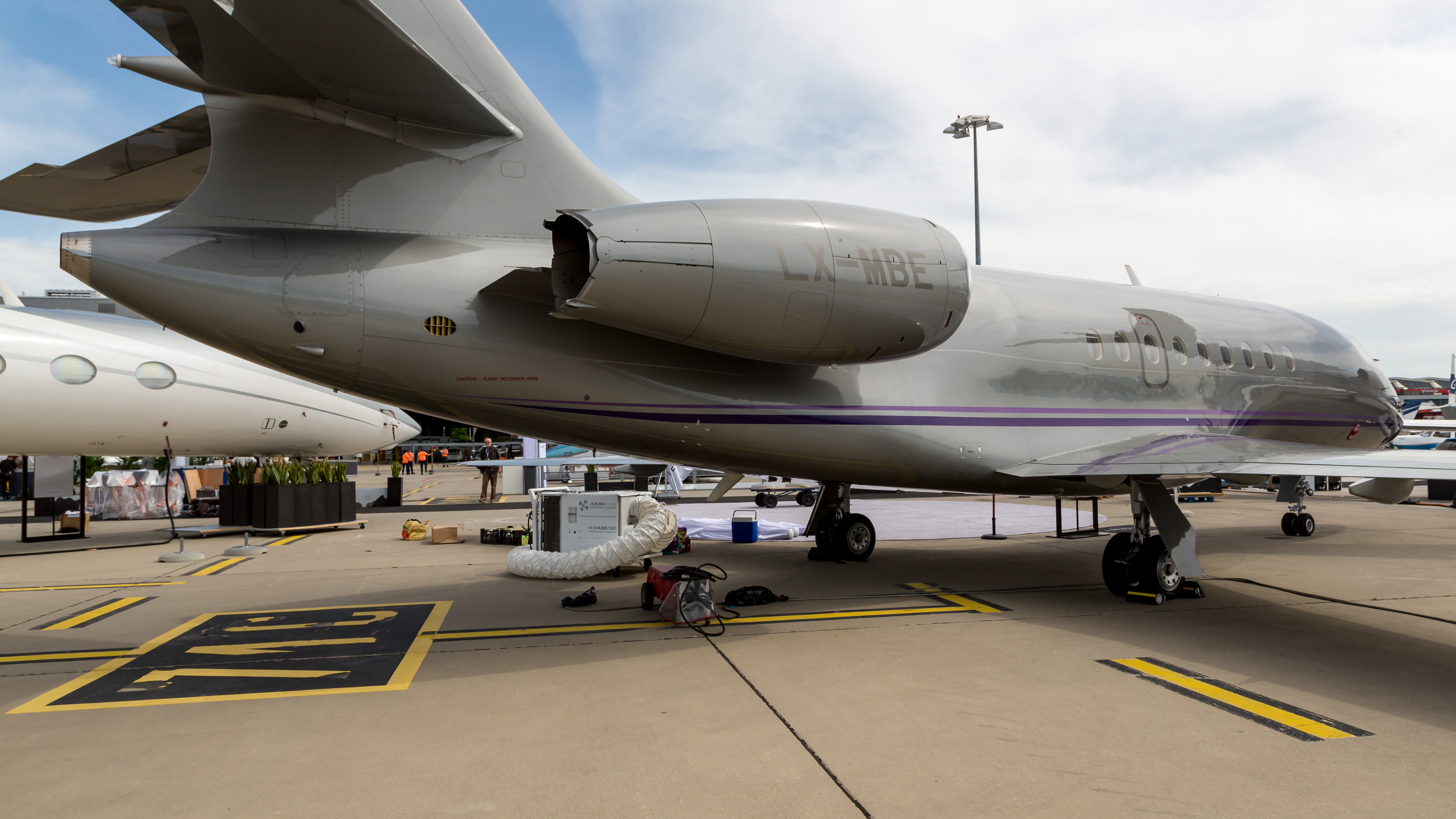
- CFE738 on a Dassault Falcon 2000
- Type: Turbofan
- National origin: United States
- Manufacturer: CFE Company
- First run: May 1990
- Major applications: Dassault Falcon 2000
- Developed from: General Electric GE27

The CFE CFE738 is a small turbofan engine aimed at the business/commuter jet market manufactured by the CFE Company, and is used on the Dassault Falcon 2000.

== Design and development ==
The success of the GE27/GLC38 gas generator development of the 1980s led to the formation of the CFE Company by GE and the Garrett Engine Division of Allied Signal (now Honeywell) in 1987.

The CFE738 is a two-shaft design, consisting of a single stage bypass fan connected via one shaft to a 3-stage low-pressure (LP) turbine at the rear of the engine; with a six-stage combination low-pressure/high-pressure (LP/HP) axial/centrifugal compressor (five axial stages and one centrifugal stage) driven by a two-stage HP turbine, between the fan and the LP turbine, on the other shaft. There is an axial combustion chamber between the compressor stages and the HP turbine. A mixer is built in to the jetpipe to mix cold bypass air with the hot exhaust gases. The engine has an overall pressure ratio of 35:1, which is extremely high for an engine with a centrifugal compressor. Other cycle parameters are a bypass ratio of 5.3 and airflow of 240 lb/s (108.9 kg/s). The take-off thrust is 5,600 lbf (24.9 kN), flat-rated to ISA +15°C (30°C, 86°F).

Chosen to power the Falcon 2000 in 1990, the engine was also first run in May 1990, and it was first flown on a Boeing 727 testbed on 31 August 1992. The CFE738-1 made its inaugural flight on a Falcon 2000 prototype on March 4, 1993. It was certified by the United States Federal Aviation Administration (FAA) on December 17, 1993, and it entered service in 1994.

== Applications ==
- Dassault Falcon 2000

== Specifications ==
Data from Élodie Roux (2007), pp.125-126

==== General characteristics ====
- Type: Two-shaft turbofan engine
- Length: 68.3 in (1,730 mm)
- Diameter: 35.50 in (902 mm) (Fan)
- Dry weight: 1,214 lb (551 kg) (Basic) Dry Weight: 1,325 lb (601 kg)

==== Components ====
- Compressor: Fan/Compressor Stages: 1/5+1C
- Turbine: HP Turbine/LP Turbine Stages: 2/3

==== Performance ====
- Maximum thrust: Max. Thrust (Sea Level Static): 5,900 lbf (26.3 kN), Cruise Net Thrust (Mach 0.8, 40000 ft, ISA): 1,310 lbf (5.8 kN)
- Overall pressure ratio: Takeoff: 23; Cruise: 32
- Bypass ratio: 5.3
- Air mass flow: 240 lb/s (6,500 kg/min)
- Turbine inlet temperature: 2,498 °F (1,370 °C; 2,957 °R; 1,643 K)
- Specific fuel consumption: Takeoff (Sea Level Static): 0.369 lb/(lbf⋅h) (10.5 g/(kN⋅s)), Cruise (Mach 0.8 (850 km/h; 530 mph), 40000 ft, ISA): 0.645 lb/(lbf⋅h) (18.3 g/(kN⋅s))
- Thrust-to-weight ratio: 4.32

== See also ==
Related development

- General Electric GE27/GE38

Related lists

- List of aircraft engines

== Bibliography ==
- Gunston, Bill (2006). World encyclopedia of aero engines: From the pioneers to the present day (5th ed.). Thrupp, Gloucestershire, UK: Sutton Publishing. ISBN 978-0-7509-4479-3.
- Leyes, Richard A. II; Fleming, William A. (1999). The History of North American Small Gas Turbine Aircraft Engines. Washington, DC: Smithsonian Institution. ISBN 1-56347-332-1.
- Warwick, Graham (June 9, 1993). "Combined power". Flight International. Vol. 144, no. 4373. pp. 64+. ISSN 0015-3710. Gale A13926755.
- CFE Company (February 1, 2008). E44NE. Federal Aviation Administration (FAA) (Report). Type Certificate Data Sheet (5th ed.).
