= GE Aerospace =

American aircraft engine manufacturer

General Electric Company

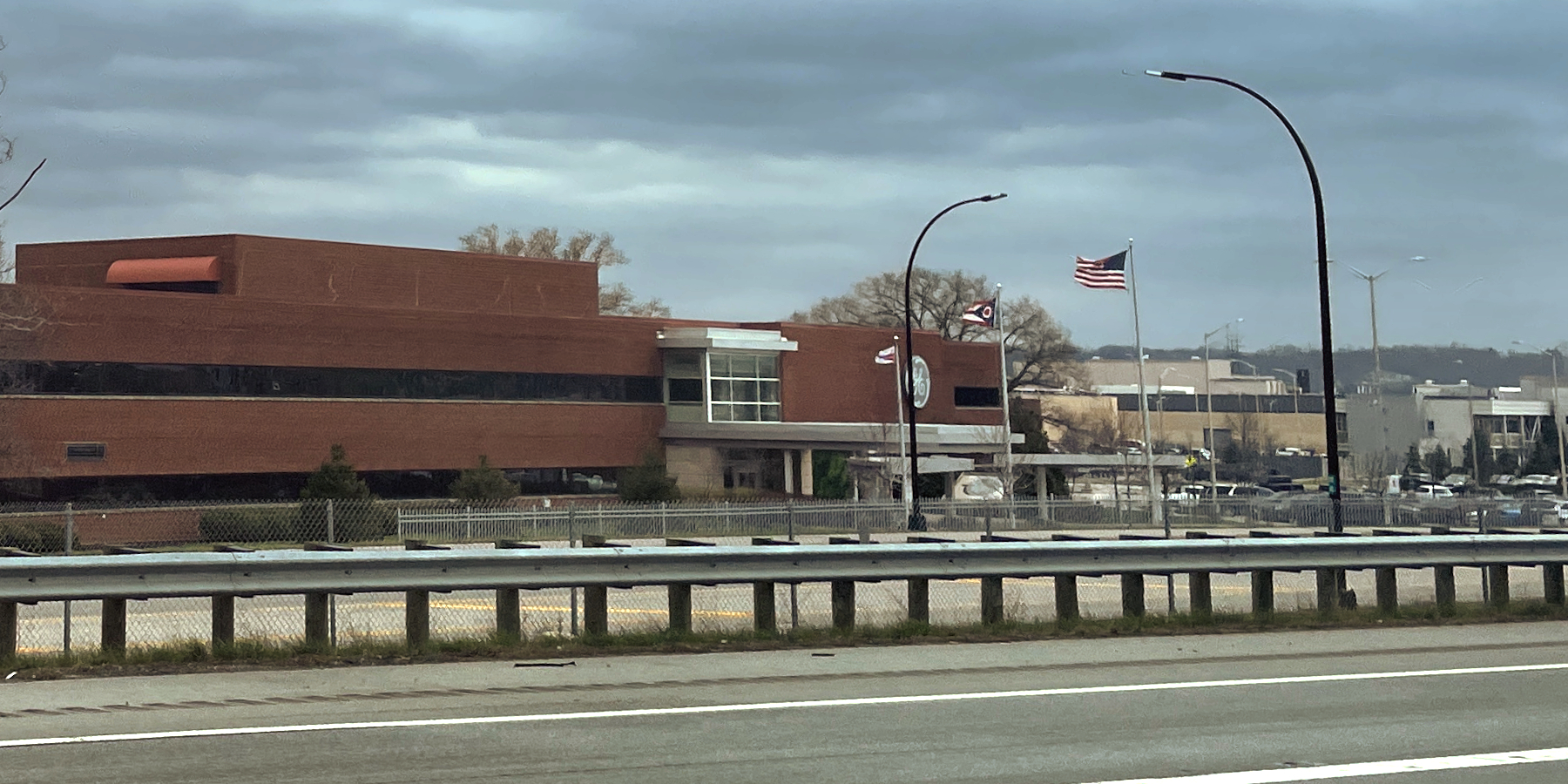
- Headquarters complex in Evendale, Ohio
- Trade name: GE Aerospace
- Formerly: Aircraft Gas Turbine Division; General Electric Aircraft Engines; GE Aviation
- Type: Public
- Traded as: NYSE: GE; S&P 100 component; S&P 500 component
- Industry: Aerospace
- Predecessor: General Electric
- Founded: 1917; 109 years ago (business); 1892; 134 years ago (legal entity)
- Headquarters: Evendale, Ohio, U.S.
- Key people: H. Lawrence Culp Jr. (Chairman & CEO)
- Revenue: ▲US$45.86 billion (2025)
- Operating income: ▲US$10.00 billion (2025)
- Net income: ▲US$8.704 billion (2025)
- Total assets: ▲US$130.2 billion (2025)
- Total equity: ▼US$18.68 billion (2025)
- Number of employees: 57,000 (2025)
- Subsidiaries: Avio Aero; CFM International (50%); Colibrium Additive; Dowty Propellers; Engine Alliance (50%); GE Aerospace Research; GE Aviation Systems; GE Aviation Czech; GE Honda Aero Engines (50%); Unison Industries
- Website: www.geaerospace.com

General Electric Company (d.b.a GE Aerospace) is an American aircraft engine supplier that is headquartered in Evendale, Ohio, outside Cincinnati. It is the legal successor to the original General Electric Company founded in 1892, which split into three separate companies between November 2021 and April 2024, adopting the trade name GE Aerospace after divesting its healthcare (GE HealthCare) and energy (GE Vernova) divisions.

GE Aerospace both manufactures engines under its name and partners with other manufacturers to produce engines. CFM International, the world's leading supplier of aircraft engines and GE's most successful partnership, is a 50/50 joint venture with the French company Safran Aircraft Engines. As of 2020, CFM International holds 39% of the world's commercial aircraft engine market share (while GE Aerospace itself holds a further 14%). GE Aerospace's main competitors in the engine market are Pratt & Whitney and Rolls-Royce.

The division operated under the name of General Electric Aircraft Engines (GEAE) until September 2005, and as GE Aviation until July 2022. In July 2022, GE Aviation changed its name to GE Aerospace in a move executives say reflects the engine maker's intention to broaden its focus beyond aircraft engines. In April 2024, GE Aerospace became the only business line of the former General Electric conglomerate, after it had completed the divestiture of GE HealthCare and GE Vernova (its energy businesses division).

== History ==
=== Early efforts ===
General Electric had a long history in steam turbine work, dating back to the 1900s. In 1903 they hired Sanford Alexander Moss, who started the development of turbosuperchargers at GE. This led to a series of record-breaking flights over the next ten years. At first, the role of the high-altitude flight was limited, but in the years immediately prior to WWII they became standard equipment on practically all military aircraft. (Note: By 1935, a Supercharger Division had been created at the River Works in Lynn, Massachusetts.) GE was a world leader in this technology; most other firms concentrated on the mechanically simpler supercharger driven by the engine itself, while GE had spent considerable effort developing the exhaust-driven turbo system that offered higher performance.

This work made them the natural industrial partner to develop jet engines when Frank Whittle's W.1 engine was demonstrated to U.S. Army General Hap Arnold in 1941. A production license was arranged in September, and several of the existing W.1 test engines shipped to the US for study, where they were converted to US manufacture as the I-A. GE quickly started production of improved versions; the I-16 (J31) was produced in limited numbers starting in 1942, and the much more powerful I-40 (J33) followed in 1944, which went on to power the first US combat-capable jet fighters, the P-80 Shooting Star.

Early jet engine work took place at Lynn, as well as GE's Syracuse, New York steam turbine plant, but soon concentrated at the former. On 31 July 1945 the Lynn plant became the Aircraft Gas Turbine Division. GE was repeatedly unable to deliver enough engines for Army and Navy demand, and production of the I-40 (now known as the J33) was also handed to Allison Engines in 1944. After the war ended, the Army canceled its orders for GE-built J33s and turned the entire production over to Allison, and the Syracuse plant closed.

=== Military and civilian expansion ===
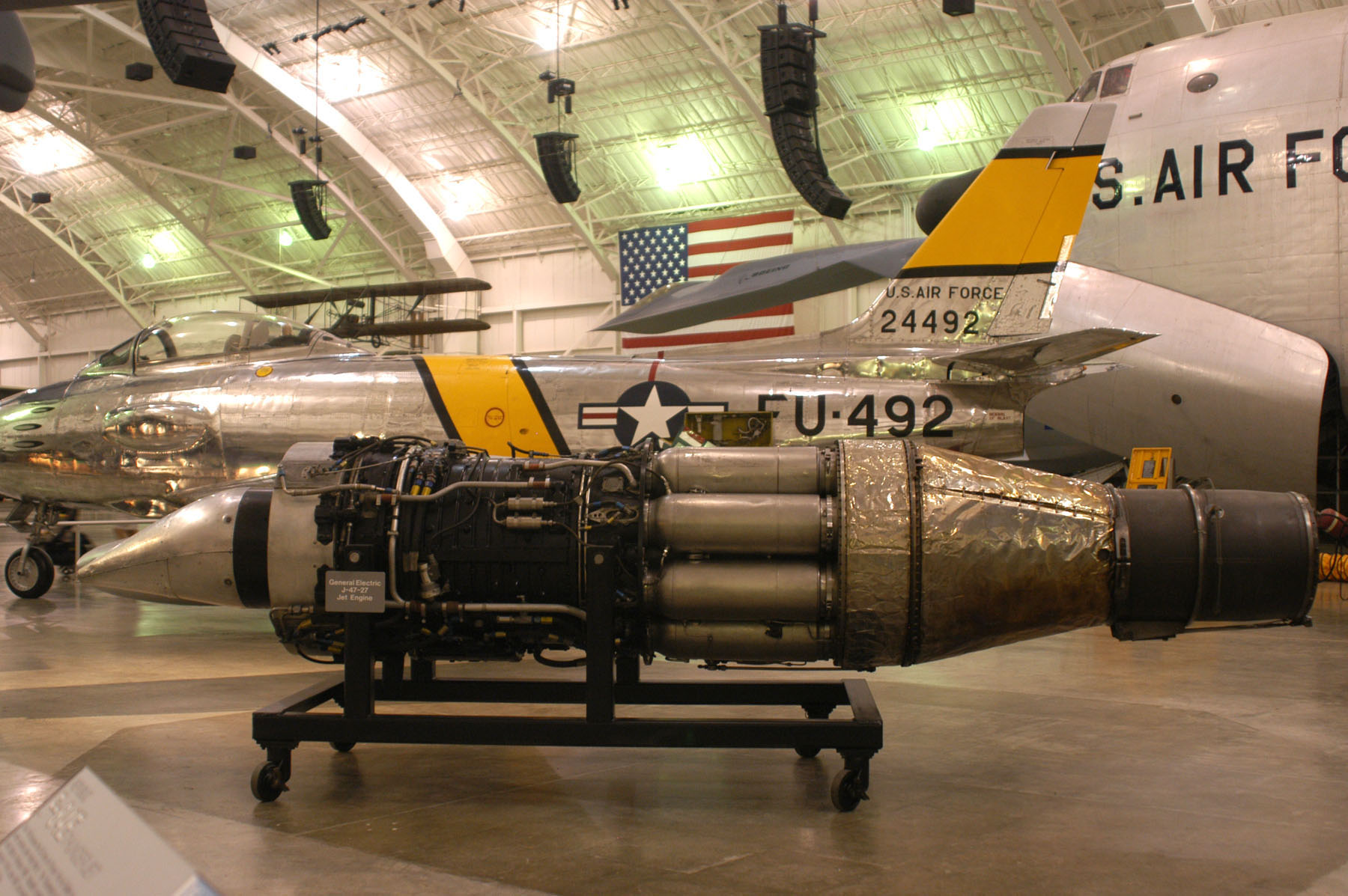
The J47 had a production run of over 30,000.

These changes in fortune led to debate within the company about carrying on in the aircraft engine market. However, the engineers at Lynn pressed ahead with the development of a new engine, the TG-180, which was designated J35 by the US military.

Development funds were allotted in 1946 for a more powerful version of the same design, the TG-190. This engine finally emerged as the famed General Electric J47, which saw a great demand for several military aircraft; a second manufacturing facility in Lockland, Ohio, near Cincinnati, was opened. (Note: The plant is now known as "GE Evendale" after the Village of Evendale, which was established in 1952.) (Note: The plant had originally been built for the Wright Aeronautical division of Curtiss-Wright. Ground was broken on 23 October 1940 and it was dedicated on 12 June 1941. Production at the plant began in 1948, but it was not officially opened until 28 February 1949, when the first two J47s were delivered to the Air Force. The plant itself was owned by Electric Auto-Lite until it was purchased by GE in 1957. The latter did not take complete possession until the end of 1958.) A strike in June 1952 exacerbated an existing delay in the production of J47s. Changes discovered as a result of flight testing had already resulted in new F-86s being parked due to a lack of engines. After negotiations failed, an additional strike began in March 1953 and lasted until May. J47 production ran to 30,000 engines by the time the lines closed down in 1956. Further development of the J47 by led to the J73, and from there into the much more powerful J79. The J79 was GE's second "hit", leading to a production run of 17,000 in several different countries. The GE and Lockheed team that developed the J79 and the F-104 Mach 2 fighter aircraft received the 1958 Collier Trophy for outstanding technical achievement in aviation. Other successes followed, including the T58 and T64 turboshaft engines, the J85 turbojet, and F404 turbofan. The Aircraft Gas Turbine Division was renamed the Flight Propulsion Division in May 1959.

Starting in 1961, General Electric started one of their most important research and development efforts, the GE1 technology demonstrator (originally designated the X101). The GE1 was a basic gas generator (compressor, combustor and turbine) onto which a variety of components such as fans, afterburners or other thrust vectoring devices could be added later. The design incorporated technologies such as a scaled compressor with variable stator vanes, an annular combustor, turbine-cooling advancements, and new materials for several government research programs. The US Government initially supported development of the GE1 to produce the J97 engine. The GE1 design and technology helped General Electric produce a range of engines, including the GE1/6 turbofan demonstrator for the TF39 engine the GE4 for the Boeing 2707 supersonic airliner, and the GE9 engine for the USAF's Advanced Manned Strategic Aircraft, later GE F101 engines for the B-1 bomber. The General Electric F101 was later developed into the General Electric F110 and CFM International CFM56 engines.

The TF39 was the first high-bypass turbofan engine to enter production. Entered into the C-5 Galaxy contest in 1964 against similar designs from Curtiss-Wright and Pratt & Whitney, GE's entry was selected as the winner during the final down-select in 1965. This led to a civilian model, the CF6, which was offered for the Lockheed L-1011 and McDonnell Douglas DC-10 projects. Although Lockheed later changed their engine to the Rolls-Royce RB211, the DC-10 continued with the CF6, and this success led to widespread sales on many large aircraft including the Boeing 747.

Another military-to-civilian success followed when GE was selected to supply engines for the S-3 Viking and Fairchild Republic A-10 Thunderbolt II, developing a small high-bypass engine using technologies from the TF39. The resulting TF34 was adapted to become the CF34, whose wide variety of models powers many of the regional jets flying today. As part of a reorganization of General Electric at the beginning of January 1968, the Flight Propulsion Division was renamed the Aircraft Engine Group.

In the early 1970s, GE was also selected to develop a modern turboshaft engine for helicopter use, the T700. It has been further developed as the CT7 turboprop engine for regional transports.

=== Commercial aviation powerplants ===
In 1974, GE entered into an agreement with Snecma of France, forming CFM International to jointly produce a new mid-sized turbofan, which emerged as the CFM56. A 50/50 joint partnership was formed with a new plant in Evendale, OH to produce the design. At first, sales were very difficult to come by, and the project was due to be canceled. Only two weeks before this was to happen, in March 1979, several companies selected the CFM56 to re-engine their existing Douglas DC-8 fleets. GE announced it would be moving the headquarters of the Aircraft Engine Group from Lynn to Evendale that September. It was revealed in August 1986 that the group would be reorganized and an advanced technology division created.

The success of the CFM led GE to join in several similar partnerships, including Garrett AiResearch for the CFE CFE738, Pratt & Whitney on the Engine Alliance GP7000, and, more recently, Honda for the GE Honda Aero Engines small turbofan project. GE also continued the development of its own lines, introducing new civilian models like the GE90, and military designs like the General Electric F110.

=== GE Aerospace today ===
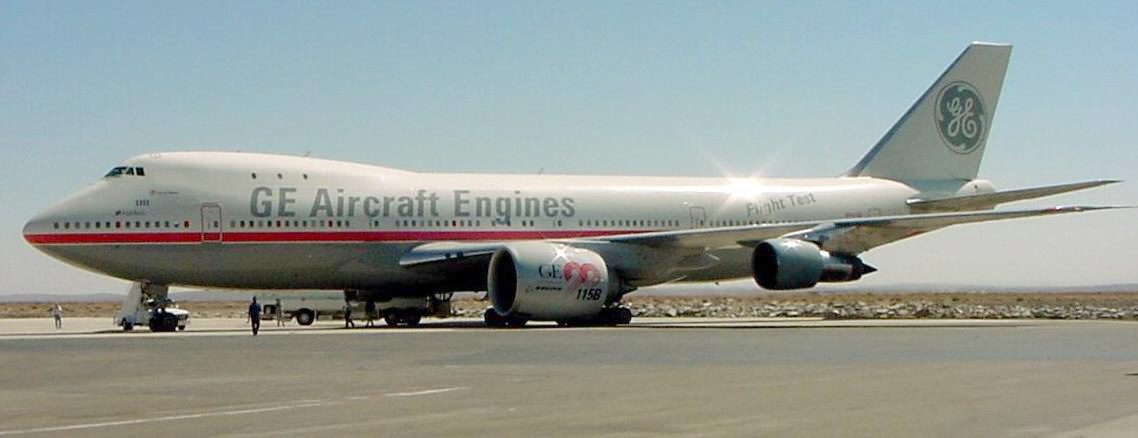
General Electric used its 747-100 testbed in the 1990s for the GE90 which powers the Boeing 777-300ER, 777-200LR and 777F.

GE and competitor Rolls-Royce were selected by Boeing to power its new 787. GE Aviation's offering is the GEnx, a development of the GE90. The engine was also the exclusive power plant on the Boeing 747-8.

The Lynn facility continues to assemble jet engines for the United States Department of Defense, subsidiary services, and commercial operators. Engines assembled at this plant include the F404, F414, T700, and CFE738. The plant at Lynn also produces the -3 and -8 variants of the CF34 regional jet engine, the CT7 commercial turboprop power plant, and commercial versions of the T700 turboshaft which are also called the CT7.

The Evendale plant conducts final assembly for the CFM International's CFM56, CF6, as well as LM6000, and LM2500 power plants.

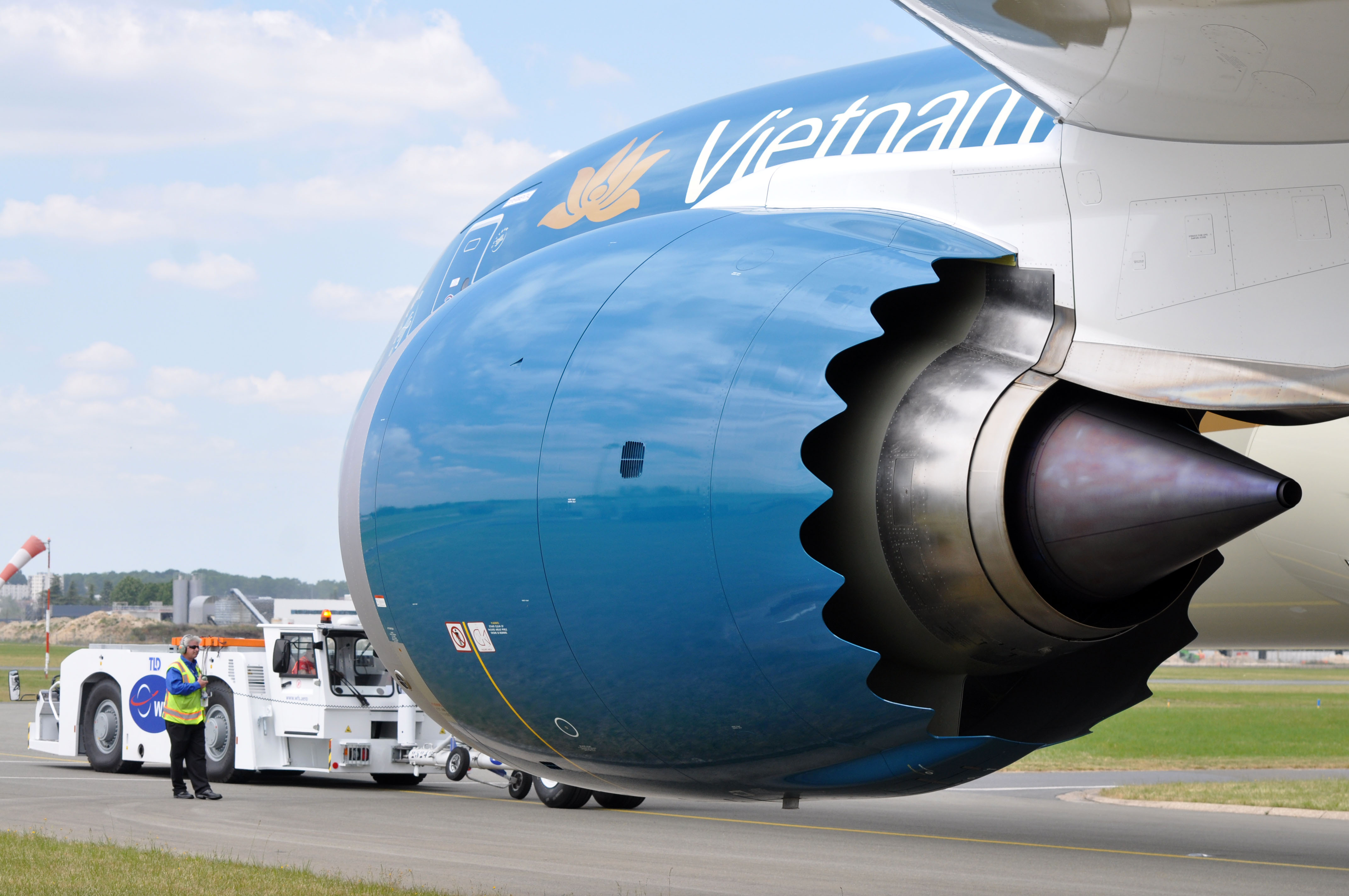
A GEnx engine installed on the Boeing 787-9 Dreamliner

The Durham, North Carolina, facility conducts final assembly for the CFM LEAP, GEnx, CFM56, GE90, GP7200, and CF34 power plants.

Crucial parts for these engines are crafted in secondary GE Aviation facilities, such as those in Bromont, Quebec; Hooksett, New Hampshire; Wilmington, North Carolina; Asheville, North Carolina; Madisonville, Kentucky; Rutland, Vermont; and Muskegon, Michigan; where the engine blades and vanes are manufactured.

The division was briefly named GE Transportation Aircraft Engines in 1995 before becoming GE Aviation.

Smiths Group and General Electric announced on January 15, 2007, that the former was divesting Smiths Aerospace to the latter for £2.4 billion (US$ 4.8 billion). GE Aviation closed the transaction on May 4, 2007. Smiths Aerospace, which was an important supplier, became an operating subsidiary of GE Aviation known as GE Aviation Systems. This acquisition will reportedly give the combined unit the clout to resist pricing pressures from its two largest customers, Boeing and Airbus. Analysts further assert that it enables General Electric to acquire assets similar to those it desired in its failed bid for Honeywell in 2000.

Along with the purchase of Smiths Aerospace, the purchase included opening the first University Development Center at Michigan Technological University in Houghton, Michigan, in the effort to work with engineering students to provide training in engineering and software development. The program has performed well and GE Aviation has announced further UDC openings at Kansas State University. In July 2008, governments in the Persian Gulf reached agreements with GE to expand engine maintenance operations there. The Wall Street Journal reported that Mubadala Development Company, which owns Abu Dhabi Aircraft Technologies, an overhaul, and maintenance company, signed an agreement worth an estimated $8 billion with GE; Abu Dhabi Aircraft Technologies will maintain and overhaul GE engines used in commercial aircraft purchased by airlines based in the Persian Gulf.

By July 2010, CFM International had delivered their 21,000th engine of the CFM56 family, with an ongoing production rate of 1250 per year, against a four-year production backlog.

On December 23, 2012, GE announced that it has agreed to purchase the aeronautical division of Avio, an Italy-based manufacturer of aviation propulsion components and systems for civil and military aircraft, for $4.3 billion U.S. (EUR3.3 billion).

GE Aviation follows through to develop a supersonic engine concept for Aerion with a configuration accommodating reasonably well requirements for supersonic speed, subsonic speed and noise levels.

On July 18, 2022, GE announced that GE Aviation had been renamed GE Aerospace, and would become the successor to the GE company once the spinoffs of its subsidiaries are completed. GE Aerospace will own the GE trademark and logo, and will license the brand to the other companies, GE HealthCare and GE Vernova.

==== Additive manufacturing ====
Recently, they have started incorporating 3D printing technologies in their engines and have incorporated the manufacturing process in the newly designed GE9X, the largest jet engine in the world.

GE acquired Arcam EBM for electron beam melting, Concept Laser for laser melting, and material provider AP&C. Metal casting improves through competition with metal additive manufacturing, for which GE Additive believes it will soon compete with metal forging which will then be enhanced in response. Additive manufacturing is focused on new builds but can be used for part replacement: when complexity rise, costs can stays level – for example, replacing a turbine consisting of 300 components with one piece. The electron beam melting has good speed for economy, precision to reduce processing work, and size capability for larger parts; the hot process reduces stresses in the part and penetrates deeper than laser for thicker parts with coarser, cheaper metal powders. Additive techniques can be used across the engine and even in the over 1,500 °F (820 °C) hot section. They are used in the CT7 combustor liner, for GE9X low pressure turbine blades – the first rotating parts – and for 16 parts in the ATP, including an 80 parts heat exchanger consolidated into one.

== Products ==
=== Turbojets ===
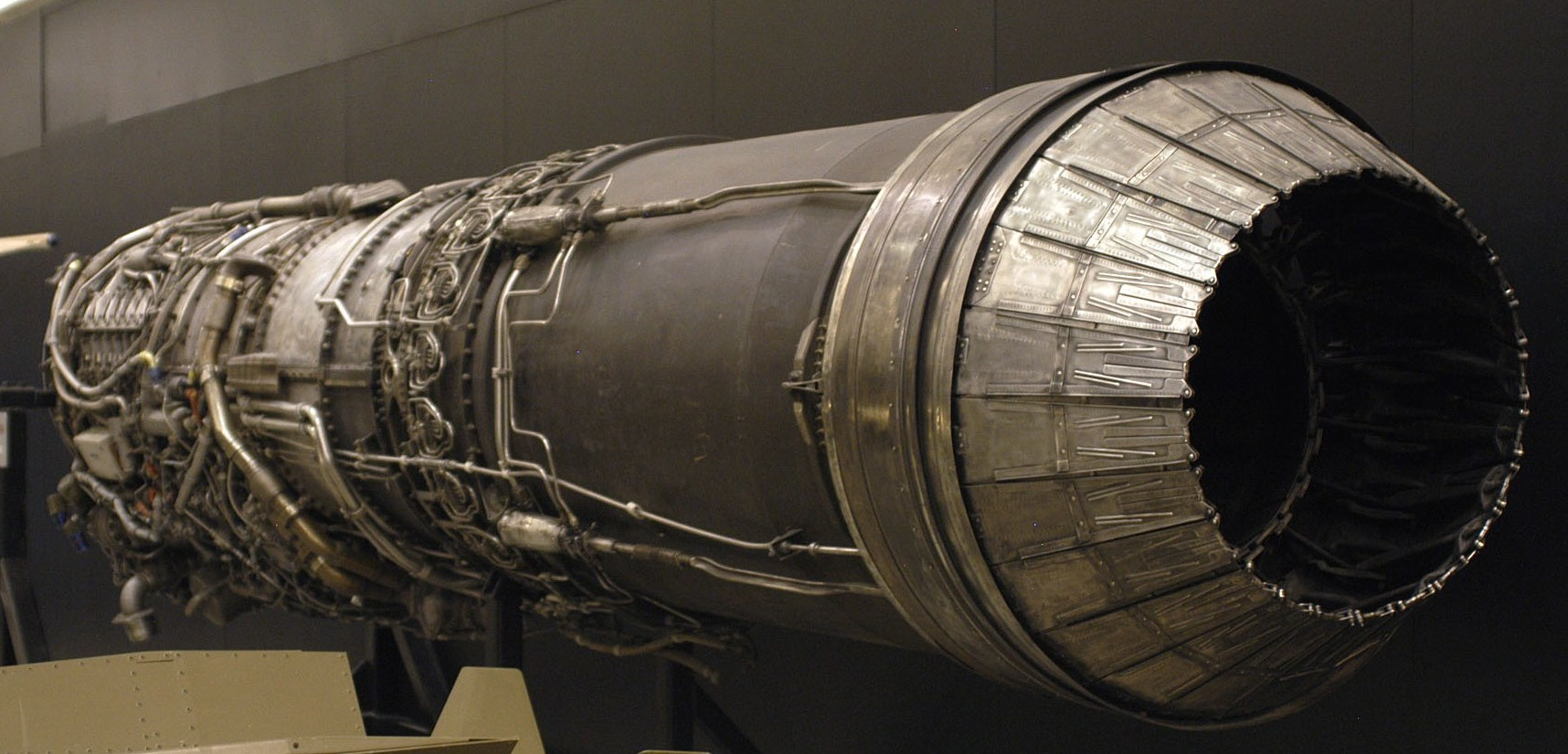
General Electric J79

Model name	Thrust
General Electric I-A	1,250 lbf (5.6 kN)
General Electric J31	1,650 lbf (7.3 kN)
General Electric J33	4,600 lbf (20 kN)
General Electric J35	5,600 lbf (25 kN)
General Electric J47	5,970 lbf (26.6 kN)
General Electric J79	11,870 lbf (52.8 kN)
General Electric CJ805	11,650 lbf (51.8 kN)
General Electric J85	2,400–5,000 lbf (11–22 kN)
General Electric CJ610	3,100 lbf (14 kN)

=== Turbofans ===
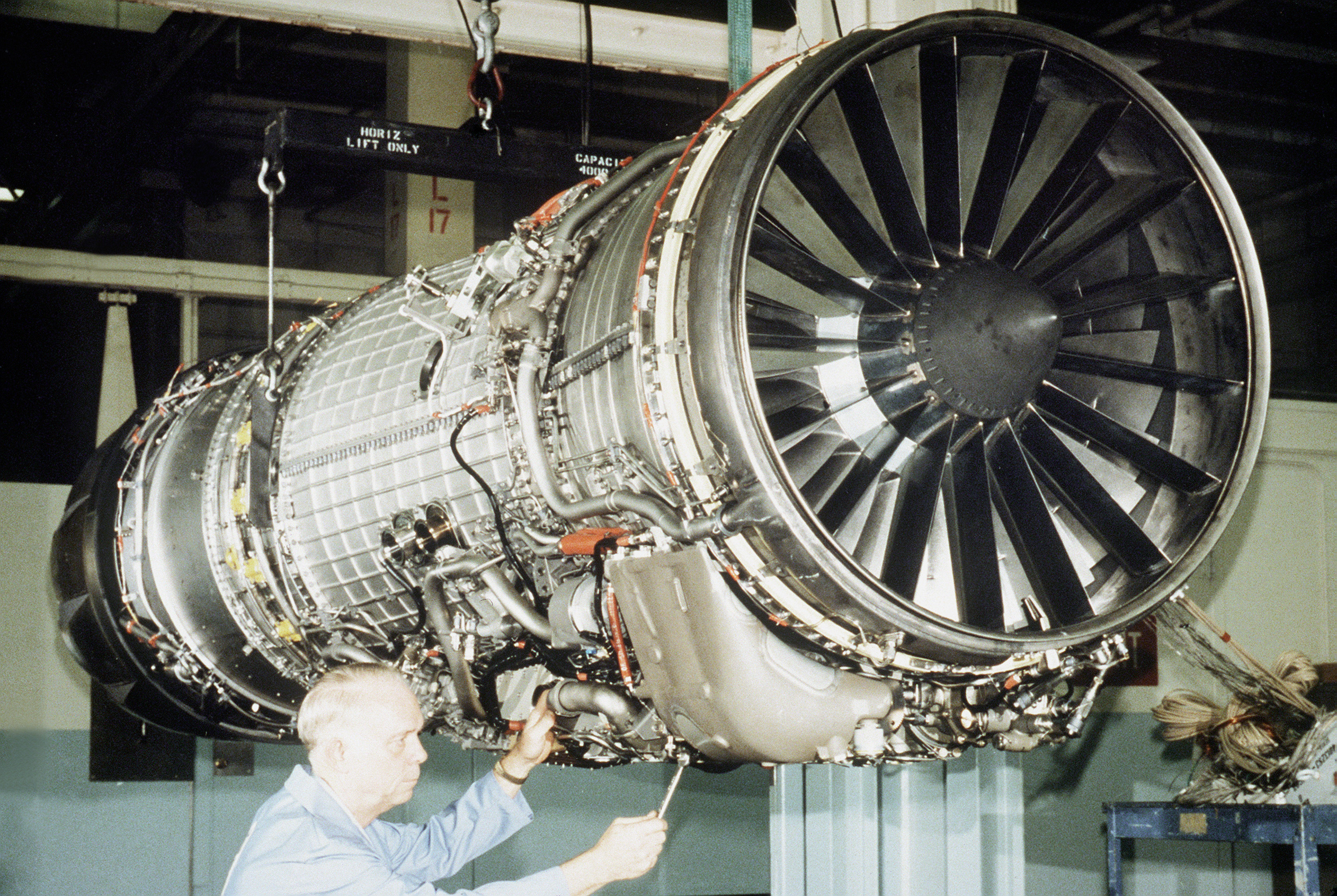
General Electric F110

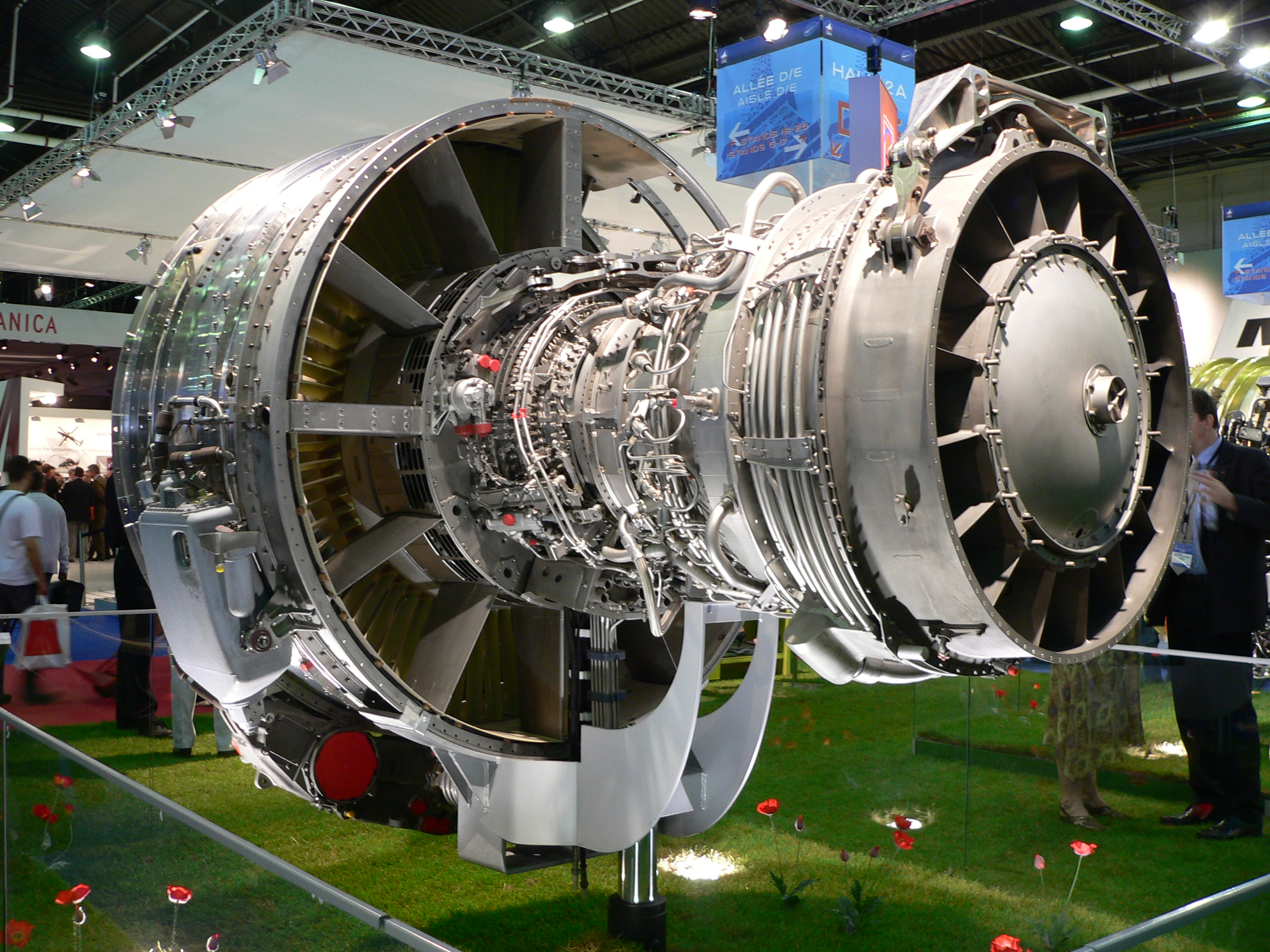
CFM International CFM56, co-developed with Safran Aircraft Engines

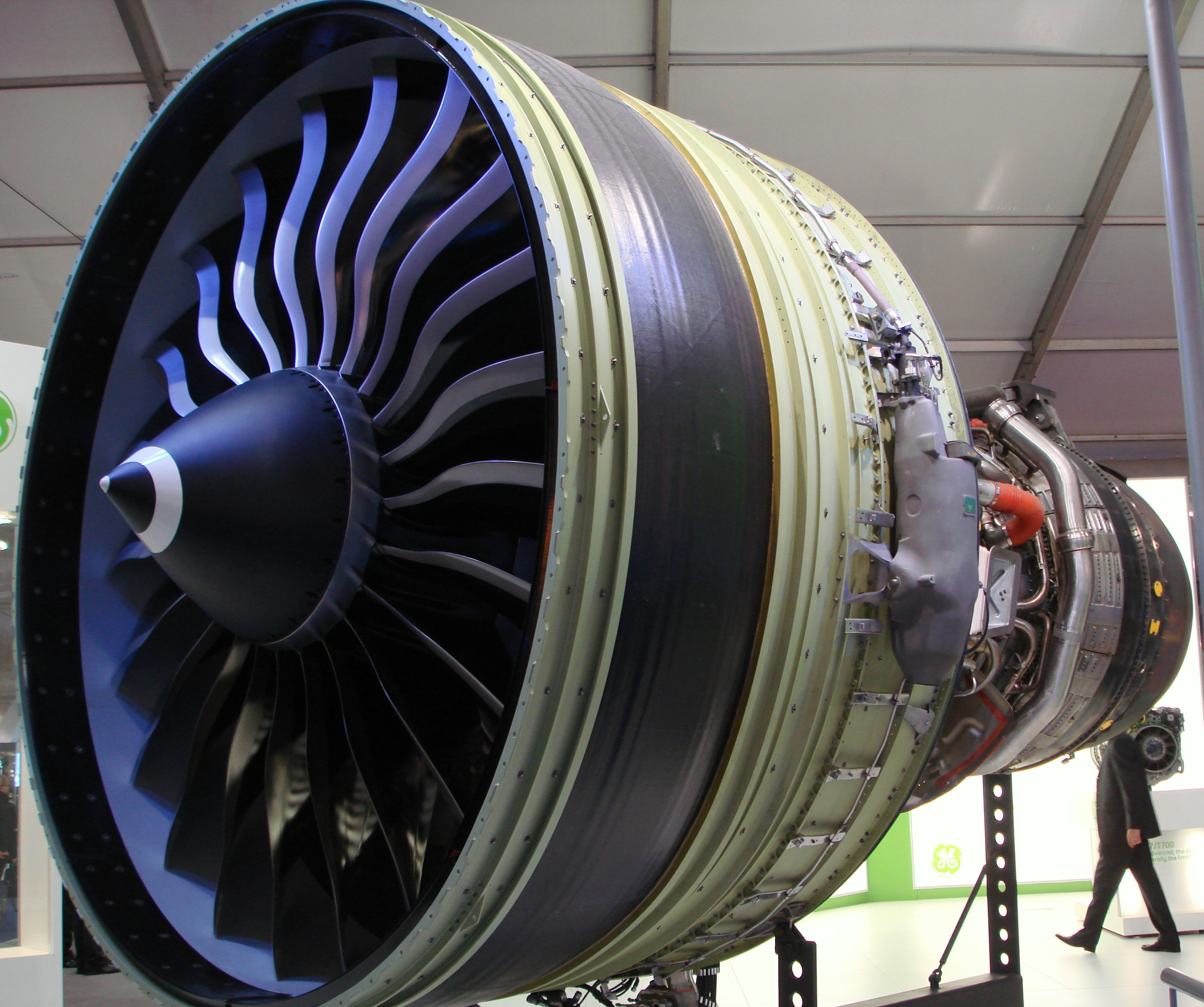
General Electric GE90

Model name	Thrust
General Electric CJ805-23	16,100 lbf (72 kN)
General Electric CF700	4,200 lbf (19 kN)
General Electric TF39	43,300 lbf (193 kN)
General Electric CF6	41,500 lbf (185 kN)
General Electric F101	17,390 lbf (77.4 kN)
General Electric TF34	9,275 lbf (41.26 kN)
General Electric CF34	9,220 lbf (41.0 kN)
General Electric F404	11,000 lbf (49 kN)
CFM International CFM56	24,000–21,580 lbf (106.8–96.0 kN)
General Electric F110	17,155 lbf (76.31 kN)
General Electric F118	19,000 lbf (85 kN)
General Electric YF120	23,500 lbf (105 kN)
CFE CFE738	5,900 lbf (26 kN)
General Electric GE90	81,000–115,000 lbf (360–510 kN)
General Electric F414	13,000 lbf (58 kN)
GE Honda HF120	2,050 lbf (9.1 kN)
General Electric/Rolls-Royce F136	25,000 lbf (110 kN)
Engine Alliance GP7200	81,500 lbf (363 kN)
General Electric GEnx	69,800 lbf (310 kN)
CFM International LEAP	32,160 lbf (143.1 kN)
General Electric Passport	17,745–18,920 lbf (78.93–84.16 kN)
General Electric GE9X	110,000 lbf (490 kN)
General Electric Affinity	16,000–20,000 lbf (71–89 kN)

=== Turboprops ===
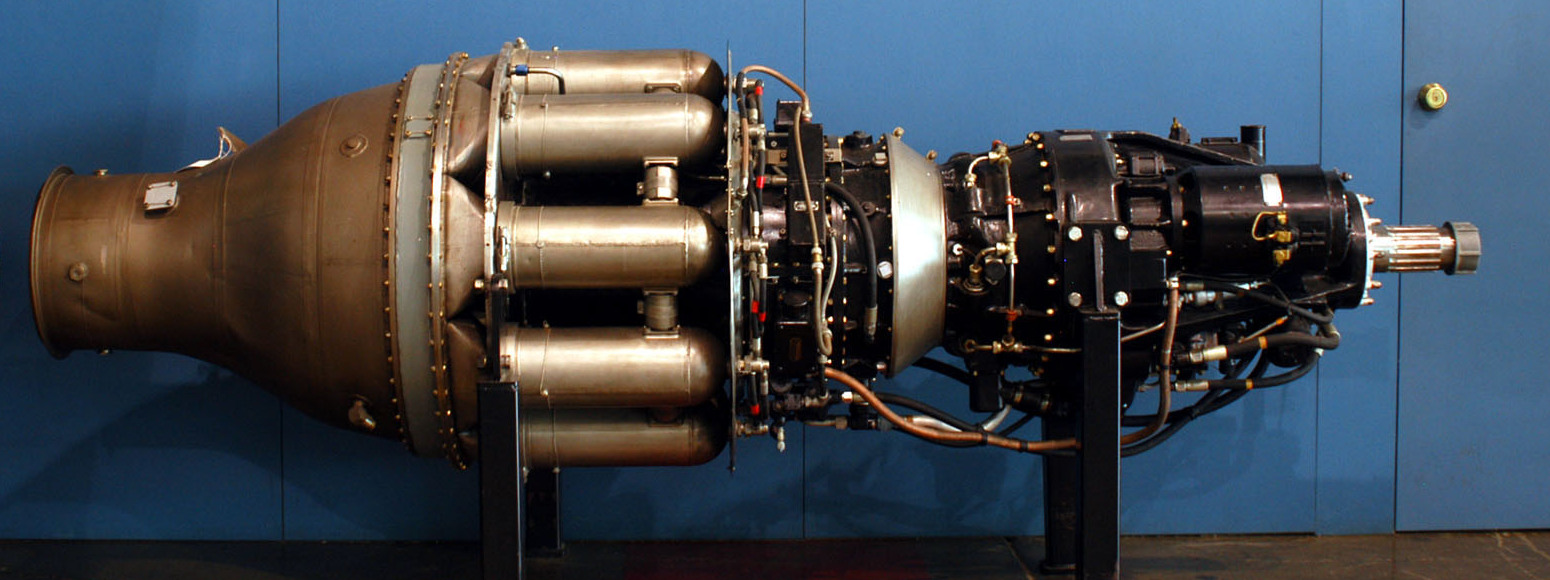
General Electric T31

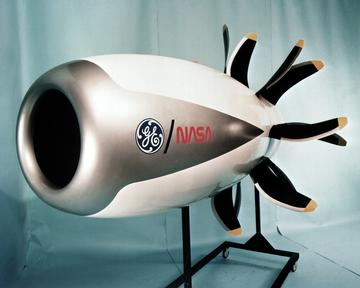
General Electric GE36

Model name	Power
General Electric T31	2,300 hp (1,700 kW)
General Electric CT7-5A	1,735 hp (1,294 kW)
General Electric H80	800 hp (600 kW)
General Electric Catalyst	1,300 hp (970 kW)

=== Propfans ===
Model name	Thrust
General Electric GE36	25,000 lbf (110 kN)

=== Turboshafts ===
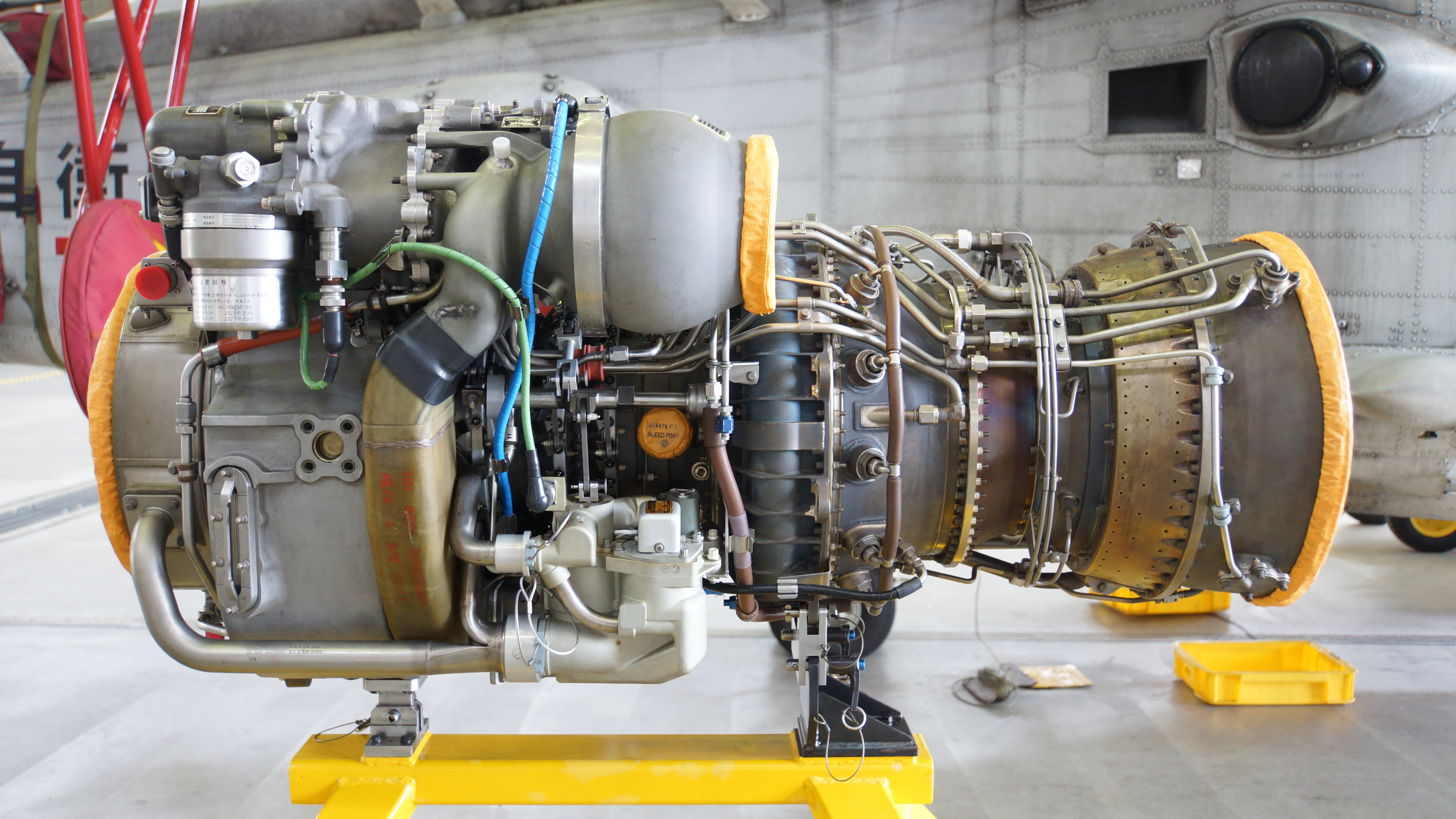
General Electric T700

Model name	Power
General Electric T58	1,250 hp (930 kW)
General Electric T64	4,330 hp (3,230 kW)
General Electric T700	1,622 hp (1,210 kW)
General Electric GE38	7,500 hp (5,600 kW)

=== Industrial and marine turbines ===
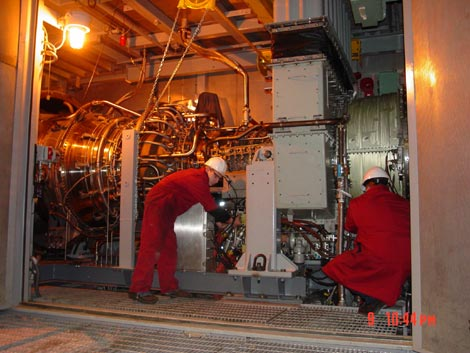
General Electric LM6000 in a power station

Model name	Power
General Electric LM500	4.5 MW (6,000 hp)
General Electric LM1500	7.4 MW (9,900 hp)
General Electric LM1600	15 MW (20,000 hp)
General Electric LM2500	25–35 MW (34,000–47,000 hp)
General Electric LM5000	35 MW (47,000 hp)
General Electric LM6000	41–52 MW (55,000–70,000 hp)
General Electric LM9000	65 MW (87,000 hp)
General Electric LMS100	100 MW (130,000 hp)

== See also ==
- La-Chun Lindsay
- Gerhard Neumann
- University Development Center
