= General Electric/Rolls-Royce F136 =

Never completed engine for the Lockheed Martin F-35 Lightning II

F136
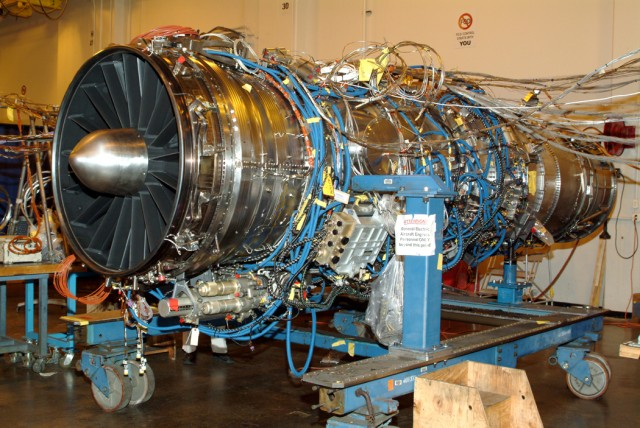
- Type: Turbofan
- National origin: United States / United Kingdom
- Manufacturer: General Electric; Rolls-Royce plc
- First run: 21 July 2004
- Major applications: Lockheed Martin F-35 Lightning II
- Developed from: General Electric YF120

The General Electric/Rolls-Royce F136 was an afterburning turbofan engine being developed by General Electric, Allison Engine Company, and Rolls-Royce (Allison was subsequently acquired by Rolls-Royce) as an alternative powerplant to the Pratt & Whitney F135 for the Lockheed Martin F-35 Lightning II. The two companies stopped work on the project in December 2011 after failing to gather Pentagon support for further development.

== Development ==
In the initial plans for Joint Strike Fighter (JSF) program, all early JSFs were to be powered by an engine derived from Pratt & Whitney's F119 turbofan intended for the F-22 Advanced Tactical Fighter (ATF), but it was planned that engine contracts would be competitively tendered from Lot 6 onward. The engines selected would be either the F119 derivative ("F119-JSF") or an engine produced by the GE/Allison Fighter Engine Team and initially designated "YF120-FX"; RR would join the GE/Allison team shortly after. Derived from GE's YF120 turbofan that was also originally for the ATF program, the engine had further hot section developments by Allison and fan developments by RR; in 1995, Allison was acquired by RR and the subsequent GE/RR Fighter Engine Team, formed in 2002, became a co-operation between GE Aviation in Cincinnati, Ohio, United States (60% share), and Rolls-Royce in Bristol, United Kingdom, and Indianapolis, Indiana, US (40% share).

In 2001, with the Lockheed Martin X-35 selected as the winner of the JSF competition to become the F-35, Pratt & Whitney's F119-JSF became the F135, while the alternate GE/RR YF120-FX engine was designated F136. On 21 July 2004, the F136 began full engine runs at GE's facility in Evendale, Ohio. The engine ran for over an hour during two separate runs. In August 2005, the United States Department of Defense awarded the GE and Rolls-Royce team a US$2.4 billion contract to develop its F136 engine. The contract was for the system development and demonstration (SDD) phase of the F136 initiative, scheduled to run until September 2013.

The US Defense budget announced on 6 February 2006 excluded the F136 — leaving Pratt & Whitney, maker of the F135 engine, as the sole provider of engines for the Lockheed Martin F-35 fighters. Congress, however, overturned this request and allocated funds for FY2007 later in 2006. In November 2006, the General Electric/Rolls-Royce team successfully completed a 3-month preliminary design review by the F-35 Program Office and the prime contractor, Lockheed Martin.

Because the F136 was in a less mature development state than the F135, GE/RR was able to better adapt its design to the changes resulting from the F-35's weight growth; the F136's fan and core airflow was upsized to better match the aircraft's revised inlet. On 13 February 2008, the GE Rolls-Royce Fighter Engine Team successfully completed its Critical Design Review (CDR) for the F136. During CDR, the U.S. Government's Joint Program Office for the F-35 Lightning II validated and approved the design of the engine. Also during the review, every aspect of the engine design was analyzed and evaluated in order to proceed with the building of the first full development engines. The process involved 80 detailed component and module design reviews, involving technical experts from the JPO, General Electric and Rolls-Royce.

On 20 March 2008, the F136 successfully completed a high-altitude afterburner testing program at the US Air Force Arnold Engineering Development Center in Tennessee, including common exhaust hardware for the F-35 Lightning II aircraft. All test objectives were reached as planned using an engine configured with Conventional Takeoff and Landing (CTOL) and Short Takeoff Vertical Landing (STOVL) common exhaust systems. The engine configuration included a production-size fan and functional augmenter allowing several run periods to full afterburner operation. The GE Rolls-Royce Fighter Engine Team successfully completed Short Take Off, Vertical Landing (STOVL) testing on an F136 engine at the GE testing facility at Peebles, Ohio on 16 July 2008.

The first complete new-build F136 engine began testing 30 January 2009, under the System Development and Demonstration (SDD) contract with the US Government Joint Program Office for the F-35 Joint Strike Fighter program. This marked the first complete engine assembled following US Government validation of the F136 design in 2008. The milestone was achieved one month ahead of schedule.

Citing the Weapon Systems Acquisition Reform Act of 2009, the GE Rolls-Royce Fighter Engine Team submitted an unsolicited fixed-price offer for the F136 to the Pentagon on 28 September 2009. The fixed-price approach would cover initial F136 engine production, beginning with the F136 second production lot. According to the GE Rolls-Royce Fighter Engine Team, the proposal would shift significant cost risk from taxpayers to the Fighter Engine Team until head-to-head competition begins between the F136 and the Pratt & Whitney F135 engine in 2013.

From 2006 to 2010 the Defense Department has not requested funding for the alternate F136 engine program, but Congress has maintained program funding.

On 19 December 2009, U.S. Congress approved continued funding for the F136 engine program in fiscal year 2010. The U.S. Defense Department did not request FY 2010 funding for the F136 engine program. In a report filed on 18 June 2009, the House Armed Services Committee cited Pratt & Whitney F135 engine program cost overruns of $1.872 billion as cause to continue funding the F136 engine.

On 2 November 2009, the F136 team said that they would redesign a small part of the diffuser leading to the combustor after a failure during testing. Testing resumed on 22 January 2010. The GE Rolls-Royce Fighter Engine Team is currently in the fourth year of its System Development and Demonstration (SDD) contract with the US Government Joint Program Office. The Fighter Engine Team has totaled more than 800 hours of testing on pre-SDD and SDD engines. In early 2010, full afterburning thrust was reached in testing of the first production standard engine.

On 24 March 2011, the Department of Defense issued a 90-day temporary stop work order after Congress failed to pass the defense budget. GE declared that it would continue work on the engine program with their own funds in spite of the stop-work order, as allowed in the order and as had been suggested by Schwartz the previous year. However GE is limited to design work only, as the stop-work prevents their use of the existing hardware.

On 12 April 2011, GE reduced its team on project from 1,000 workers down to 100, who will work on the F136 and engine technologies for "future combat aircraft". GE will redeploy the workers to commercial projects, but will not hire the hundreds of new engineers it was expecting. On 25 April 2011, the Department of Defense ended the contract with GE and demanded that the engines built to date be turned over.

On 5 May 2011, GE and RR offered to pay for the development through FY2012 and asked for access to the materials. By switching to self funding the cost would reduce from $480 million a year to only $100 million, 60% to be paid by GE and 40% to be paid by RR. After self-funding the project GE and Rolls-Royce announced on 2 December 2011, that they would not continue development of the F136 engine because it is not in their best interest, citing the "continued uncertainty in the development and production schedules for the JSF Program." By then, the six engines had logged more than 1,200 hours of testing since 2009. During the year, GE said that development of the engines was 80% complete; the remaining work would have required US$1.9–2.6 billion in funding.

== Design ==
The F136 is a twin-spool axial-flow low-bypass turbofan. It has a 3-stage low-aspect ratio fan driven by a 3-stage low-pressure turbine, and a 5-stage compressor driven by a single-stage turbine; both the fan and compressor stages are one-piece blisks. The STOVL variant's shaft-driven LiftFan is connected to the low-pressure spool and engaged through a clutch. The low-pressure spool's 3 turbine stages enable more work to be extracted to power the LiftFan, while the conventional takeoff variant retains this architecture for commonality. The annular combustor case is made from "Lamilloy" and cooled by bleed air from the compressor. The two spools are counterrotating, eliminating the stage 1 low pressure turbine nozzle and thus reducing parts count. The vanes behind the turbines are made of ceramic matrix composites (CMC), enabling higher operating temperatures for greater efficiency and thrust. Like the competing F135, the F136 was to have a stealthy augmentor, or afterburner, that blocks line-of-sight of the turbine blades and a convergent-divergent nozzle with serrated flaps that reduce the infrared signature of the exhaust plume. During ground testing, the F136 used the same exhaust system as the F135. The engine would be controlled by a BAE-supplied full authority digital engine control (FADEC).

Because the F136 was designed well into the F-35's System Development and Demonstration (SDD) phase, it could better match its fan and core to the F-35 inlet, which was revised in 2005 to increase mass flow to 400 lb/s (181.4 kg/s) for greater thrust due to aircraft weight growth. The F136 produced 28,000 lbf (125 kN) of thrust in military power and 43,000 lbf (191 kN) in full afterburner, same as the F135 but with greater temperature margins due to the higher air mass flow, resulting in longer hot-section parts life and greater potential for future growth. In the STOVL configuration, the F136 produced 18,000 lbf (80.1 kN) of lift thrust. Combined with thrust from the LiftFan (20,000 lbf or 89.0 kN) and two roll posts (1,950 lbf or 8.67 kN each), the Rolls-Royce LiftSystem produced a total of 41,900 lbf (186 kN) of thrust. This compares with the maximum thrust of 23,800 lbf (106 kN) for the Harrier's Rolls-Royce Pegasus engine.

== Applications ==
- Lockheed Martin F-35 Lightning II

== Specifications (F136-GE-100) ==
Data from Air International, Aviation Week

==== General characteristics ====
- Type: Twin-Spool, axial flow, augmented turbofan
- Length: 221 in (560 cm)
- Diameter: 48 in (120 cm)
- Dry weight:

==== Components ====
- Compressor: 3-stage fan, 5-stage high-pressure
- Combustors: Annular Combustor
- Turbine: 1-stage HPT, 3-stage LPT counter-rotating turbines

==== Performance ====
- Maximum thrust: 43,000 lbf (191 kN); 28,000 lbf (125 kN) without afterburner
- Air mass flow: 380 lb/s (172.4 kg/s)
- Thrust-to-weight ratio: >8.0:1

== See also ==
Related development

- General Electric YF120

Comparable engines

- Pratt & Whitney F135

Related lists

- List of aircraft engines
