= USS Bairoko =

Commencement Bay-class escort carrier of the US Navy

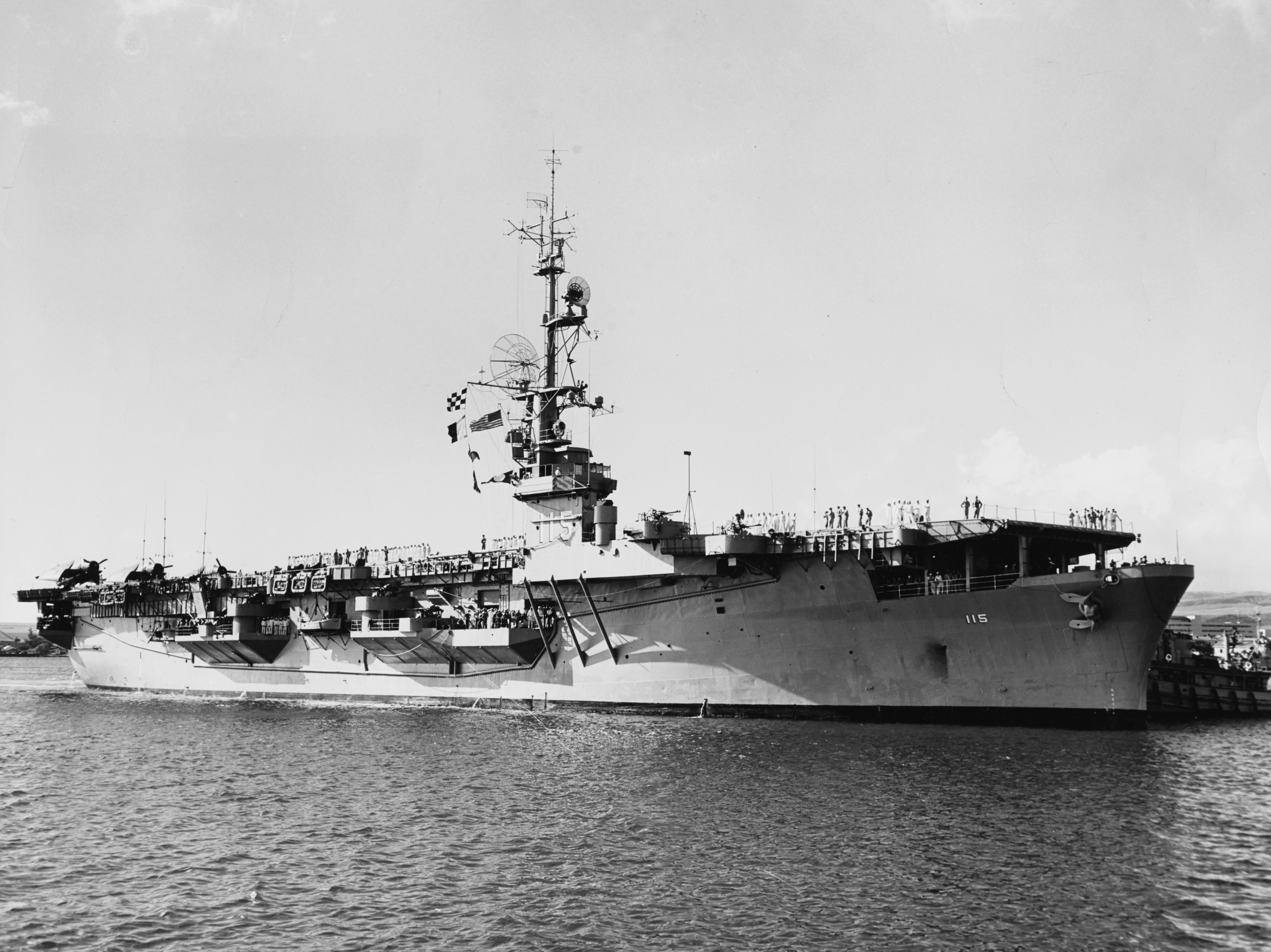
- USS Bairoko on 28 July 1949

History

United States
- Name: USS Bairoko
- Namesake: The Battle of Bairoko
- Builder: Todd-Pacific Shipyards
- Laid down: 25 July 1944
- Launched: 25 January 1945
- Commissioned: 16 July 1945
- Decommissioned: 14 April 1950
- Recommissioned: 12 September 1950
- Decommissioned: 18 February 1955
- Stricken: 1 April 1960
- Fate: Scrapped 1961

General characteristics
- Class & type: Commencement Bay-class escort carrier
- Displacement: 21,397 long tons (21,740 t)
- Length: 557 ft 1 in (169.80 m) loa
- Beam: 75 ft (23 m)
- Draft: 32 ft (9.8 m)
- Installed power: 16,000 shp (12,000 kW); 4 × boilers
- Propulsion: 2 × Steam turbines; 2 × screw propellers
- Speed: 19 knots (35 km/h; 22 mph)
- Complement: 1,066
- Armament: 2 × 5 in (127 mm) dual-purpose guns; 36 × 40 mm (1.6 in) Bofors AA guns; 20 × 20 mm (0.8 in) Oerlikon AA guns
- Aircraft carried: 33
- Aviation facilities: 2 × aircraft catapults

USS Bairoko was a Commencement Bay-class escort carrier of the United States Navy in service from 1945 to 1955. The Commencement Bay class were built during World War II, and were an improvement over the earlier Sangamon class, which were converted from oil tankers. They were capable of carrying an air group of 33 planes and were armed with an anti-aircraft battery of 5 in (127 mm), 40 mm (1.6 in), and 20 mm (0.8 in) guns. The ships were capable of a top speed of 19 knots (35 km/h; 22 mph), and due to their origin as tankers, had extensive fuel storage.

== Design ==
In 1941, as United States participation in World War II became increasingly likely, the US Navy embarked on a construction program for escort carriers, which were converted from transport ships of various types. Many of the escort carrier types were converted from C3-type transports, but the Sangamon-class escort carriers were instead rebuilt oil tankers. These proved to be very successful ships, and the Commencement Bay class, authorized for Fiscal Year 1944, were an improved version of the Sangamon design. The new ships were faster, had improved aviation facilities, and had better internal compartmentation. They proved to be the most successful of the escort carriers, and the only class to be retained in active service after the war, since they were large enough to operate newer aircraft.

Bairoko was 557 ft 1 in (169.80 m) long overall, with a beam of 75 ft (23 m) at the waterline, which extended to 105 ft 2 in (32.05 m) at maximum. She displaced 21,397 long tons (21,740 t) at full load, of which 12,876 long tons (13,083 t) could be fuel oil (though some of her storage tanks were converted to permanently store seawater for ballast), and at full load she had a draft of 27 ft 11 in (8.51 m). The ship's superstructure consisted of a small island. She had a complement of 1,066 officers and enlisted men.

The ship was powered by two Allis-Chalmers geared steam turbines, each driving one screw propeller, using steam provided by four Combustion Engineering-manufactured water-tube boilers. The propulsion system was rated to produce a total of 16,000 shp (12,000 kW) for a top speed of 19 knots (35 km/h; 22 mph). Given the very large storage capacity for oil, the ships of the Commencement Bay class could steam for some 23,900 nautical miles (44,300 km; 27,500 mi) at a speed of 15 knots (28 km/h; 17 mph).

Her defensive anti-aircraft armament consisted of two 5 in (127 mm) dual-purpose guns in single mounts, thirty-six 40 mm (2 in) Bofors guns, and twenty 20 mm (1 in) Oerlikon light AA cannons. The Bofors guns were placed in three quadruple and twelve twin mounts, while the Oerlikon guns were all mounted individually. She carried 33 planes, which could be launched from two aircraft catapults. Two elevators transferred aircraft from the hangar to the flight deck.

== Service history ==
=== Construction and early career ===
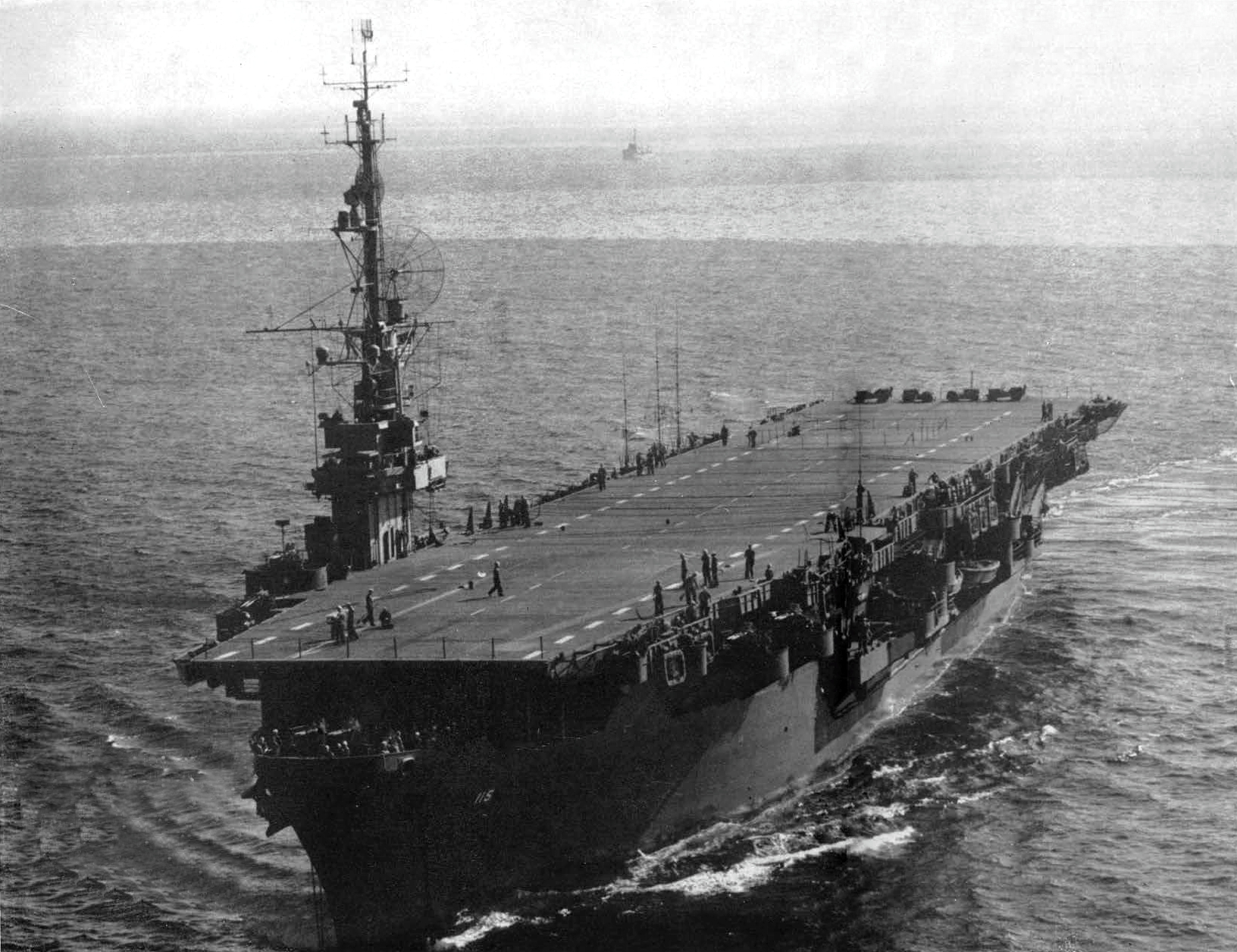
Bairoko underway in 1945

The first fifteen ships of the Commencement Bay class were ordered on 23 January 1943, allocated to Fiscal Year 1944. The ship was originally named Portage Bay, but on 5 June 1944, before construction of the ship began, she was renamed Bairoko after the battles fought around Bairoko Harbor during the Solomon Islands campaign; American forces captured the harbor in August 1943. The ship was laid down at the Todd-Pacific Shipyards in Tacoma, Washington, on 25 July 1944. She was launched on 25 January 1945 and was commissioned on 16 July 1945. Bairoko then completed fitting out work before conducting her shakedown cruise in Puget Sound. She sailed for San Diego, California, in early August. After arrival, her new complement of aircraft carried out flight training for the rest of the month. She was finally ready for service on 3 September, the day after the surrender of Japan formally ended World War II. The ship then went into the shipyard at San Pedro for repairs that lasted for four weeks.

On 18 October, Bairoko left San Pedro for a lengthy cruise in the western Pacific. She stopped in Pearl Harbor on the way, staying there for about two weeks before departing on 7 November. While en route, her orders were changed, directing her to join her sister ships Siboney and Puget Sound in the Mariana Islands in the central Pacific. She arrived there on 24 November, and the three carriers, joined by four destroyer escorts, formed a task group and sailed for Hong Kong on 30 November. The carriers conducted combined air training exercises while on the way. After arriving, the ships underwent maintenance for a week and then departed on 21 December, bound for Manila, the Philippines. The group arrived two days later, and remained in port there until 30 December, when they departed for Guam. There, Bairoko left the rest of the ships and sailed back to California alone. She reached San Diego on 25 January 1946.

=== 1946–1949 ===
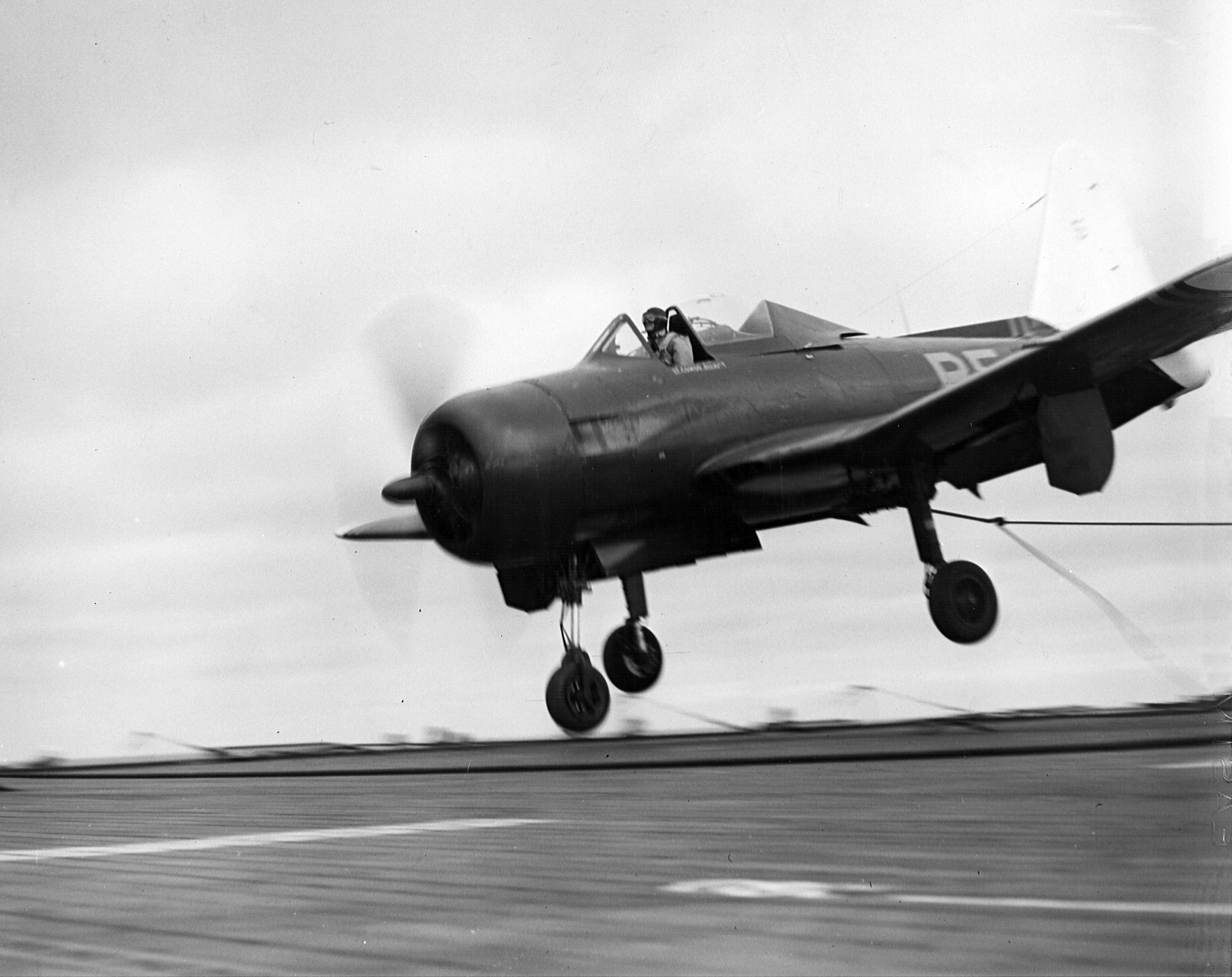
A Ryan FR-1 Fireball landing on Bairoko, 1946

On 1 February, Bairoko returned to Tacoma for modifications to allow her to operate jet aircraft. Work on the ship lasted for three weeks, after which she participated in pilot qualification training in Puget Sound. She arrived back in San Diego on 3 March, where she took on sixteen Ryan FR-1 Fireball jet-and-piston fighters of VF-41 squadron. Bairoko carried out fight testing of the new aircraft until 26 April, when the ship was removed from active service due to crew shortages. She remained confined to port until 15 September, when she was reactivated. The ship went to sea next on 15 October for general training exercises. She sailed for San Pedro on 26 October for another round of modifications that lasted for three months. The ship was back in service by 24 January 1947, and she cruised in the local area until 17 February, when she departed for Pearl Harbor to take on a load of aircraft she was to ferry to other carriers participating in fleet problem 2-47, which was held between 2 and 9 March. Bairoko then returned the planes to San Diego after the maneuvers, arriving there on 20 March.

The ship next got underway on 7 April, this time to ferry aircraft to China. She stopped in Guam on 27 April and embarked Marine squadron VMF-218, which was equipped with twenty Vought F4U Corsair fighters. Bairoko stopped in Shanghai, China, on 8 May and the marines flew off their aircraft the following day. The planes were to be transferred to VMF-211, which was based in Qingdao, China. Bairoko meanwhile departed for Okinawa, thereafter proceeding home on 13 May. She stopped in Guam and Pearl Harbor on the way, before ultimately arriving in San Diego at the end of May. She spent the rest of the year participating in anti-submarine exercises off the coast of California. On 21 November, during one of the maneuvers, a land-based Lockheed P-2 Neptune accidentally crashed, prompting a search and rescue effort for the crew. Bairoko's boats picked up an observer and the co-pilot, but the other ten men aboard the plane were killed in the accident.

Bairoko moved to San Pedro on 7 January 1948 for further modifications, this time receiving a decontamination center on her hangar deck and a repair facility for scientific instruments. These changes were in preparation for Operation Sandstone, a series of three nuclear weapons tests conducted in Eniwetok Atoll. The ship left San Pedro on 17 February, carrying a load of reconnaissance planes, support helicopters, and scientists from the Radiological Safety Group. The ship arrived in Eniwetok on 17 March for the tests, which were carried out on 15 April, 1 May, and 15 May. For each blast, Bairoko anchored some 8.5 nmi (15.7 km; 9.8 mi) from the hypocenter so that observers could photograph the tests. Her helicopters and boats were then sent out to collect soil samples and radiation readings in the area. Her crew also assisted with the decontamination of equipment used in the tests. By early June, the ship had returned to San Diego.

The ship spent the rest of the year conducting, pilot qualifications, anti-submarine training exercises, and other maneuvers off the coast of California. As naval budgets were being reduced by late 1948, Bairoko was ordered to proceed to the San Francisco Naval Shipyard to be deactivated. On 14 April 1950, she was decommissioned and assigned to the Pacific Reserve Fleet.

=== Korean War ===
==== First deployment ====
Bairoko's period in reserve proved to be short, as North Korean forces invaded South Korea on 25 June 1950, and two days later, the US led the United Nations to intervene on the side of South Korea. Bairoko was recommissioned on 12 September, initially to train pilots and transport them and their aircraft to the war zone. The ship moved to Alameda, California for fitting out, after which she embarked VMF-311 to transport them to Korea. She reached Japan on 29 September, where VMF-311 left the ship, to be replaced by the anti-submarine squadron VS-21. The ship thereafter began anti-submarine patrols in the Yellow Sea to guard against a potential Soviet entrance into the war. She performed this role for the following five months, making a total of twelve week-long patrols in the area. During these operations, she also participated in anti-submarine training with American submarines.

On 10 May 1951, while in Yokosuka, Japan, an explosion rocked the ship, starting a major fire in her hangar that quickly spread to the engine room. Five men were killed in the blaze, which badly damaged the ship, destroying ventilation and electrical systems and weakening internal bulkheads. She underwent repairs in Yokosuka, which lasted until late June. By 3 July, she was ready to resume operations in the Yellow Sea. Bairoko took the sixteen TBM-3 Avengers from VS-23 the same day, though the ship remained in the region for just four more weeks, departing for California on 4 August. She arrived in San Diego on 15 August and remained there for nearly a month. She went to sea on 10 September for ten weeks of training operations with VS-25 off San Diego, including anti-submarine practice and night flight operations with Grumman AF Guardian patrol aircraft. The ship left California on 1 December to begin another deployment to Korean waters.

==== Second deployment ====
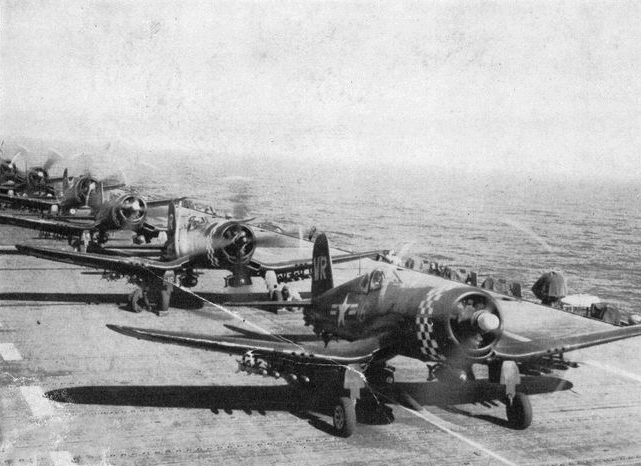
Vought F4U Corsair fighters aboard Bairoko in 1952

Bairoko arrived in Yokosuka on 16 December and then left for Okinawa on 28 December. But while leaving Yokosuka, she struck a mooring buoy and bent two of the blades on her starboard propeller. The ship had to be dry docked for repairs. She finally arrived at Okinawa on 5 January 1952, where she spent the following two weeks carrying out training for VS-25. The ship then embarked VMF-312 on 11 February in preparation for combat operations in Korea. Five days later, she arrived in her patrol area in the Yellow Sea, escorted by the British destroyers HMS Charity and Cossack. The ship's fighters carried out patrols over southern North Korea over the next nine days, attacking any targets of opportunity they encountered, including bridges, gun positions, and supply vehicles. The Corsairs of VMF-312 flew some 121 combat sorties during the nine days. On 25 February, Bairoko returned to Sasebo to refuel and replenish ammunition and supplies.

The ship returned to the Yellow Sea for another patrol from 5 to 13 March; after refueling again, she embarked on a third patrol from 23 March to 1 April. The ship's aircraft repeated their activities from the first patrol in February, though the operational tempo was lower; her pilots totaled 139 sorties between the second and third patrols. Over the course of these operations, five of her planes were shot down; one pilot was killed, another was rescued by the British frigate HMS Cardigan Bay, and the remaining three were picked up by search and rescue helicopters. Bairoko replenished at Sasebo in early April before resuming operations in the Yellow Sea on 9 April. VMF-312 flew a total of 165 sorties over the following eight days, striking a variety of North Korean targets and losing only two aircraft; only one was shot down by North Korean fire. The second crashed on attempting to land on Bairoko. Both pilots survived the incidents.

On 18 April, the British aircraft carrier HMS Glory arrived to relieve Bairoko off the western coast of Korea, allowing the latter vessel to return to Japan. There, she received minor repairs, and on 2 May, VS-25 returned to the ship for anti-submarine exercises held off Okinawa. On 24 May, the ship sailed back to Yokosuka, where she refueled before departing for the United States. She passed through Pearl Harbor on the way to San Diego, where she arrived on 10 June. The ship was then dry docked at the Long Beach Naval Shipyard for an extensive overhaul to repair her propulsion machinery, which was worn out after her long tour in East Asia. On 1 October, Bairoko emerged from the shipyard and sailed for San Diego three days later. For the rest of the year, she took part in local training exercises, including air search practice and joint anti-submarine warfare training with destroyer escorts. In late October, she was present to observe test firings of the new RIM-8 Talos guided missile then under development.

==== Third deployment ====
On 12 January 1953, Bairoko steamed out of San Diego to begin her third and final deployment to the Korean theater of operations. She stopped in Pearl Harbor six days later and remained there for a week before resuming her voyage. The ship also passed through Guam and Okinawa, before ultimately arriving in Yokosuka on 18 February. She initially returned to Okinawa for anti-submarine training in company with a group of destroyer escorts from 7th Fleet. Bairoko arrived in the Yellow Sea on 14 May, ready to begin air operations against North Korean forces. Once again carrying VMA-312, the carrier launched a total of 183 sorties during this period, which included raids on enemy positions, aerial reconnaissance, and combat air patrols. The ship then returned to Sasebo for supplies. Over the period from 30 May to 27 July, the ship made a further four patrols in the Yellow Sea, each following a similar pattern. In addition, her aircraft supported partisans fighting behind the lines, and from 17 to 26 June, they covered the evacuation effort for those partisans and their families. The ship's combat operations in Korea ended on 27 July, the day the Korean Armistice Agreement ended the fighting. For the ship's service during the war, Bairoko received three battle stars.

=== Later career ===
The ship left Japan on 7 August, bound for California. She stopped in Pearl Harbor to disembark some of her aircraft, before proceeding on to San Diego. After arriving there on 24 August, she moved once again to the Long Island Naval Shipyard for an overhaul and modifications. The work lasted some seven weeks, after which Bairoko returned to San Diego to begin preparations for her role in Operation Castle, a major nuclear weapons test at Eniwetok and Bikini Atoll that included a series of six detonations. The ship spent the rest of 1953 and early 1954 loading radiological equipment and observation aircraft, including six photo-reconnaissance Corsairs from VC-3 and twelve helicopters from HMR-362. On 9 January, the ship got underway for the Marshall Islands.

On 20 January, Bairoko arrived in Kwajalein, where she provided air transport to workers who were preparing facilities for the tests on Bikini and Eniwetok. Her aircraft flew observation missions during the blasts to conduct radiological surveys of the area, and the ship herself served as a decontamination center. On 1 March, the Castle Bravo detonation significantly exceeded expectations, showering Bairoko—which was some 38 nautical miles (70 km; 44 mi) away—with highly radioactive nuclear fallout. The ship's ventilation system was sealed to prevent contamination, but sixteen of her crew were nevertheless exposed to the radioactive dust and received radiation burns. The fallout also reached the Japanese fishing boat Daigo Fukuryū Maru, which was about 90 nautical miles (170 km; 100 mi) away, and burned 23 of her crew. Bairoko remained in the area for the remaining five tests, and on 16 May, she departed for home, arriving on 28 May.

For the next month and a half, Bairoko participated in training exercises off San Diego. On 17 July, she returned to the Long Beach Naval Shipyard for the last time, to be overhauled prior to assignment to the reserve. By this time, the Navy had begun replacing the Commencement Bay-class ships with much larger Essex-class aircraft carriers, since the former were too small to operate newer and more effective anti-submarine patrol planes. Proposals to radically rebuild the Commencement Bays either with an angled flight deck and various structural improvements or lengthen their hulls by 30 ft (9.1 m) and replace their propulsion machinery to increase speed came to nothing, as they were deemed to be too expensive. She was moved to the San Francisco Naval Shipyard on 8 October for additional inactivation work. She was eventually decommissioned on 18 February 1955 and assigned to the Pacific Reserve Fleet, which was based in San Francisco. She was reclassified as an aircraft ferry with the hull number AKV-15 on 7 April 1959, but she saw no further active service. She remained in the Navy's inventory for another three years before being struck from the Naval Vessel Register on 1 April 1960. She was then sold to the Hyman-Michaels Company on 10 August to be broken up.
