= VS-24 =

United States Navy squadron

Anti-submarine Squadron 24
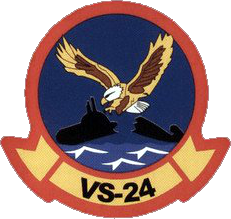
- VS-24 Insignia
- Active: 1 January 1943 – 1 June 1956; 8 Apr 1960 - March 2007
- Country: United States
- Branch: United States Navy
- Role: Anti-submarine warfare Anti-surface warfare
- Homeport: NAS Jacksonville
- Nickname(s): Duty Cats
- Aircraft: SB2C Helldiver; AF-2S/W Guardian; S-3 Viking
- Engagements: World War II; Gulf War; Operation Southern Watch; Operation Deliberate Force

Sea Control Squadron 24 (VS-24) was a squadron of the United States Navy. Originally established as VB-17 on 1 January 1943, it was redesignated as VA-5B on 15 November 1946, redesignated as VA-64 on 27 July 1948, redesignated as VC-24 on 8 April 1949 and redesignated as VS-24 on 20 April 1950, it was disestablished on 1 June 1956. It was however reestablished again before being decommissioned in 2007.

== History ==
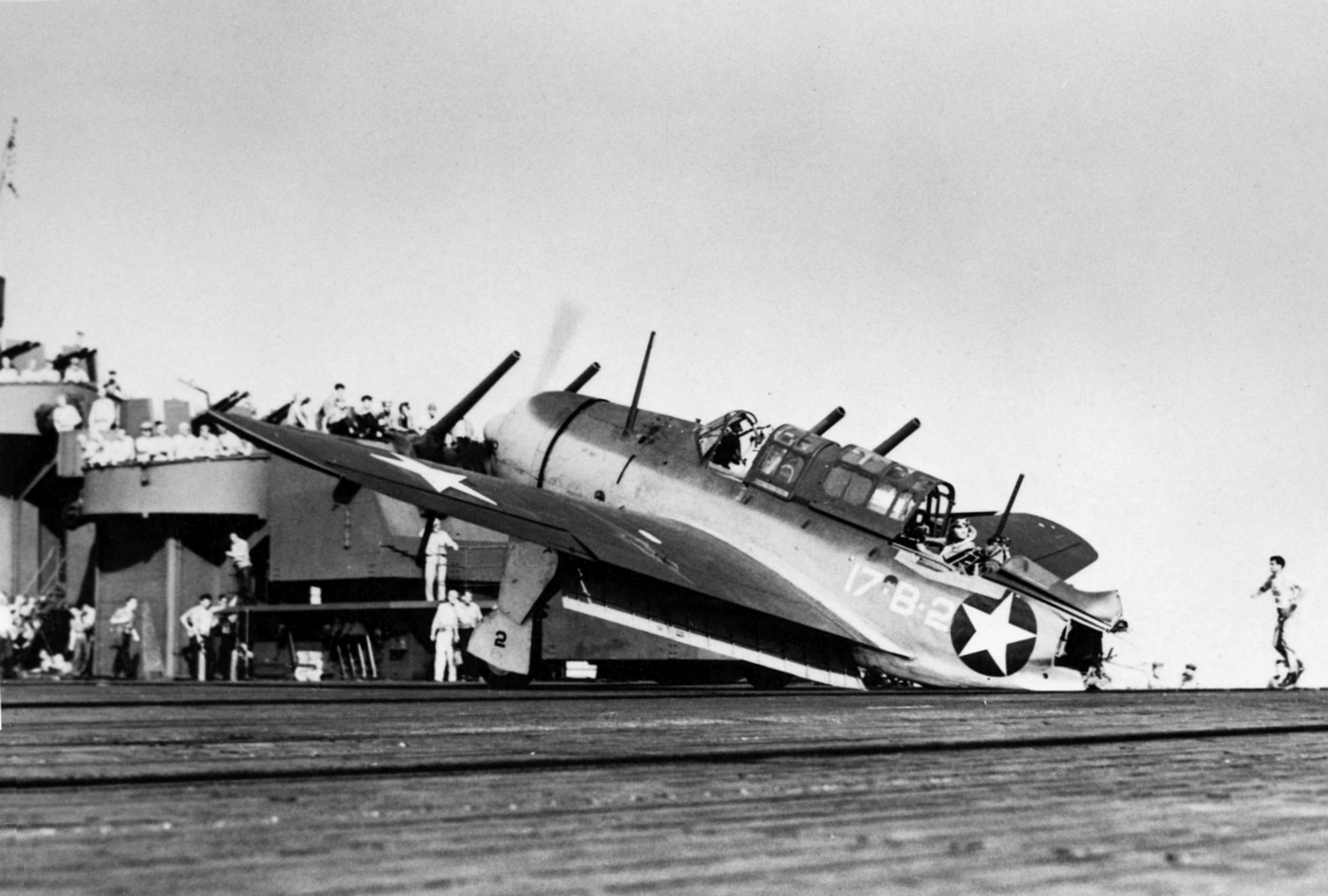
VB-17 SB2C-1 loses its tail on landing on USS Bunker Hill in 1943

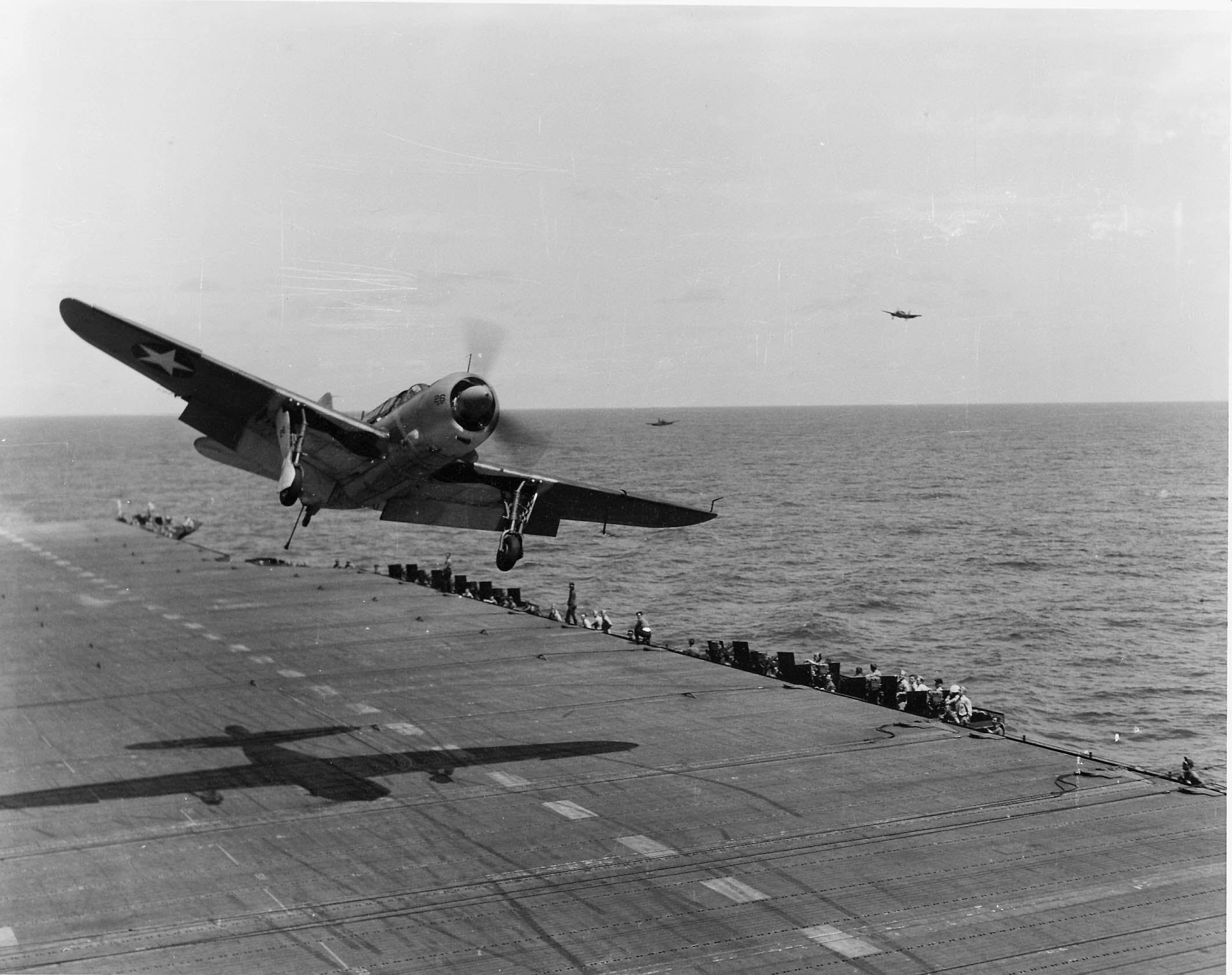
VB-17 SB2C-1 waves off a landing on USS Bunker Hill in 1943

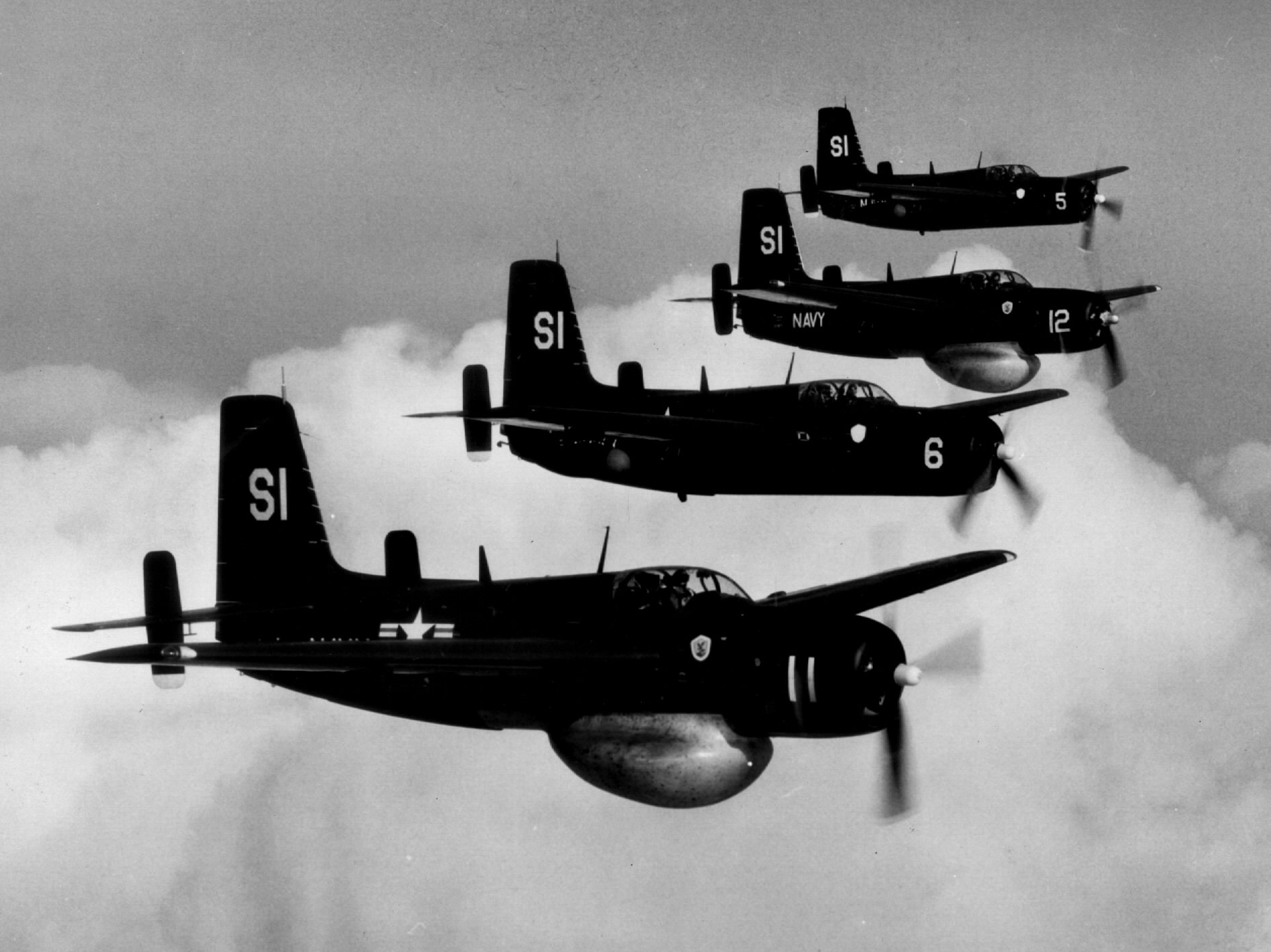
VS-24 AF-2S and AF-2W Guardians c.1951

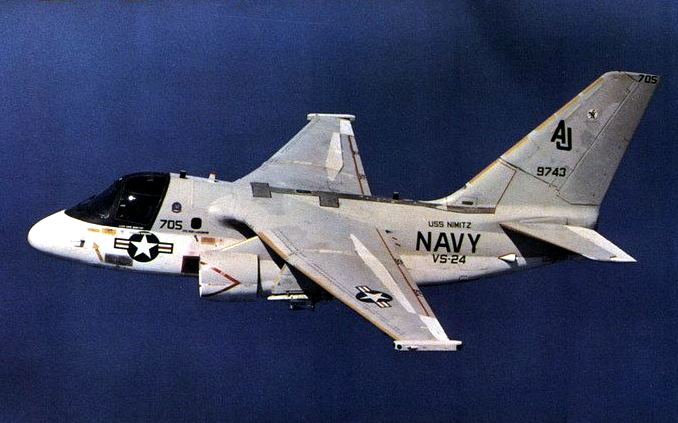
VS-24 S-3A of Carrier Air Wing EIGHT aboard USS NIMITZ, c.1981

=== First VS-24 (1943-1956) ===
VB-17 based on USS Bunker Hill, used the SB2C Helldiver in its combat debut, attacking Rabaul on 11 November 1943.

VB-17 formed part of Carrier Air Group 17 (CVG-17) and operated from USS Hornet from February–June 1945.

VS-24 became the first fleet squadron to operate the AF-2S/W Guardian, receiving its first aircraft on 27 September 1950.

=== Second VS-24 (1960 - 2007) ===
VS-24 was re-established in 8 Apr 1960 at NAS Quonset Point, Rhode Island as Air Antisubmarine Squadron TWO FOUR, nicknamed the Scouts, flying the S-2 Tracker and deploying aboard Essex class aircraft carriers of the Atlantic Fleet. With the 1974 closure of NAS Quonset Point due to post-Vietnam War force reductions, the squadron relocated to NAS Cecil Field, Florida and transitioned from the prop-driven S-2G Tracker to the jet-powered S-3 Viking for deployment aboard Forrestal, Kitty Hawk and Nimitz class aircraft carriers.

In 1991 the Scouts deployed to the Persian Gulf in support of Operation Desert Storm; VS-24 crews were responsible for the first S-3B land strike over enemy territory and the first sea strike against a hostile patrol craft. Following the war, Sea Control Squadron TWENTY-FOUR participated in Operation Provide Comfort rendering aid to Kurdish refugees fleeing Iraq.

In 1993, having transitioned from the S-3A to the S-3B Viking, VS-24 was re-designated as Sea Control Squadron TWO FOUR (VS-24) to better reflect the multi-mission role of the S-3B.

In 1995 the Scouts deployed aboard USS Theodore Roosevelt (CVN-71) for operations in the Red Sea and the Persian Gulf supporting Operation Southern Watch, and in the eastern Mediterranean in support of NATO strikes against Bosnian-Serb military targets. During Operation Deliberate Force, VS-24 became the first S-3B squadron to launch Tactical Air Launched Decoys (TALD) in support of overland strikes.

In 1997 VS-24 returned to the Red Sea and Persian Gulf to support the ongoing efforts of Operation Southern Watch, and participated in Operation Deliberate Guard in the Mediterranean and Adriatic Seas. During this deployment, the Scouts were the most heavily utilized squadron in the air wing accumulating over 2,300 flight hours while maintaining a 100 percent mission completion rate. Scout crews repeatedly proved the Viking to be the platform of choice for conducting Surface Warfare and Electronic Surveillance.

The movement of VS-24 and its eight S-3B Viking aircraft on 27 Oct 1997 began the relocation of VS-24 from NAS Cecil Field to NAS Jacksonville, ten miles east. This move was in compliance with the 1993 Base Realignment and Closure (BRAC) Commission, which ordered NAS Cecil Field be closed by 1 Oct 1999. The remainder of VS-24's parent S-3 wing was scheduled to relocate to NAS Jacksonville before the end of December 1997. A total of 48 aircraft in six VS squadrons comprising the entire Atlantic Fleet VS wing ultimately moved to NAS Jacksonville, along with nearly 2,000 military and civilian employees.

Over the years, VS-24 received numerous awards for excellence in operational readiness. These included the Captain Arnold J. Isbell trophy for antisubmarine warfare (ASW) excellence, the COMNAVAIRLANT Battle Efficiency Award, the Silver Anchor Award for retention, the Golden Anchor Award for 1996, the Arleigh Burke Award for the most improved squadron, and the Carrier Air Wing EIGHT (CVW-8) Santa Barbara Shrine Award for ordnance excellence. VS-24 also received the Conventional Weapons Squadron of the Year, the Electronic Warfare Squadron of the Year, and the Commander, U.S. Sixth Fleet's Hook 'Em Award for 1997. The squadron was also awarded multiple Sea Control Wing Atlantic Golden Wrench Awards for maintenance proficiency.

As part of the retirement of the S-3B Viking from the U.S. Navy's operational aircraft inventory, VS-24 was disestablished in ceremonies at NAS Jacksonville in Mar 2007.

== Home port assignments ==
- 1950-1951 NAS Norfolk, Virginia
- 1951-1954; 1960-1974 NAS Quonset Point, Rhode Island
- 1974-1997 NAS Cecil Field, Florida
- 1997-2007 NAS Jacksonville, Florida

== Aircraft assignment ==
- SB2C Helldiver
- AF-2S/W Guardian
- Grumman S-2 Tracker
- Lockheed S-3A Viking
- Lockheed S-3B Viking

== See also ==
- History of the United States Navy
- List of inactive United States Navy aircraft squadrons
- List of United States Navy aircraft squadrons
