= Bréguet 960 Vultur =

French carrier-based attack/ASW aircraft prototype

960 Vultur
- The Br 960 Vultur in flight with rockets visible under the wing

General information
- Type: Attack and ASW aircraft
- Manufacturer: Bréguet Aviation
- Number built: 2

History
- First flight: 4 August 1951
- Developed into: Bréguet 1050 Alizé

The Bréguet Br 960 Vultur was a prototype two-seat carrier-based attack and anti-submarine aircraft (ASW) built for the French Navy (Marine Nationale) during the early 1950s. Meeting contradictory endurance and speed requirements, it was designed as a "mixed-power" aircraft with a turboprop engine in the front and a turbojet in the rear. Only two examples were built, but the second aircraft was rebuilt as the prototype of the Bréguet 1050 Alizé ASW aircraft after the Navy dropped the idea of a turboprop attack aircraft in the mid-1950s.

== Design and development ==
On 12 November 1947, Naval Aviation (Aéronavale) issued a specification for a carrier-based attack and anti-submarine aircraft capable of carrying bombs, depth charges, guided missiles, rockets and torpedoes and using rockets to assist its takeoff. The aircraft needed to have an endurance of four hours at sea level and be able to reach speeds between 300 and 700 kilometers per hour (190 and 430 mph). Its landing speed had to be less than 155 km/h (96 mph) and the crew protected by armor.

Bréguet recognized that the speed requirements were contradictory and could only be met by a mixed-power design that combined a diminutive Armstrong Siddeley Mamba turboprop in the nose with a Rolls-Royce Nene turbojet in the tail. The Br 960 Vultur ("Vulture") was a low-wing monoplane with an oval-shaped monocoque fuselage and tricycle landing gear. Its two-spar wing featured a swept leading edge and a straight trailing edge which used hydraulic mechanisms to fold vertically. The tailplane was similarly swept and had 16° of dihedral. There was a 600-litre (130 imp gal; 160 US gal) self-sealing fuel tank in the fuselage and a 350-litre (77 imp gal; 92 US gal) self-sealing tank in each outer wing panel. The aircraft accommodated a pilot and copilot sitting side-by-side in a framed canopy.

The first prototype was fitted with a 970-shaft-horsepower (720 kW) Mamba I engine and a 21.6-kilonewton (4,900 lb_{f}) Nene 101 turbojet which had its air supplied by ducts in the wing roots. The aircraft made its first flight on 4 August 1951 and proved to be very underpowered, so much so that it could not be flown at full load without the Nene running. The second prototype incorporated modifications that addressed some of the problems revealed by the flight testing of the earlier aircraft. It first flew on 15 September 1952 with more powerful engines, a 1,320 shp (980 kW) Mamba III with 1.8 kN (400 lb_{f}) of residual thrust and a 22.2 kN (5,000 lb_{f}) Nene. Installed on its wingtips were small nacelles; the port one contained a 100-litre (22 imp gal; 26 US gal) unprotected fuel tank while the starboard nacelle housed an attack radar. The first prototype proved to have poor flying characteristics, but the second aircraft met all of the requirements of the specifications and demonstrated satisfactory carrier catapulting and landing qualities at the Royal Aircraft Establishment's facility at Farnborough Airfield in early 1953 (no French facility was equipped to evaluate those things at that time). Both aircraft gave no warning of an impending stall. The first prototype was later modified to test engine air blown through slots in the upper surface of the wing intended to improve lift as the Br 963.

The aircraft was fitted with a single hardpoint below the fuselage that could carry a 1,000 kg (2,200 lb) payload. Under the wings were four launchers that could carry two rockets apiece. In addition to bombs, the under-fuselage hardpoint was equipped to carry a more powerful search radar in a container.

When Aéronavale lost interest in a turboprop attack aircraft in 1953–1954, but was keen to purchase a new dedicated anti-submarine warfare platform, Bréguet modified the second prototype as a proof-of-concept demonstrator. The Nene was removed and its tailpipe was blanked off while the turboprop was upgraded to a more powerful Mamba VI model. A retractable AN/APS-15 search radar was installed in the fuselage while both wingtip nacelles were removed. Additional fuel tanks replaced the engine air ducts and wheel wells in the inner wing sections and the landing gear was modified to retract forward into large nacelles on the wing leading edges. Now known as the Br 965 Épaulard ("Killer Whale"), it made its first flight on 26 March 1956 and was the immediate forerunner of the Bréguet 1050 Alizé. It continued to fly until it had a landing accident on 2 May after which it was used as a source of spares of the first prototype.

== Variants ==
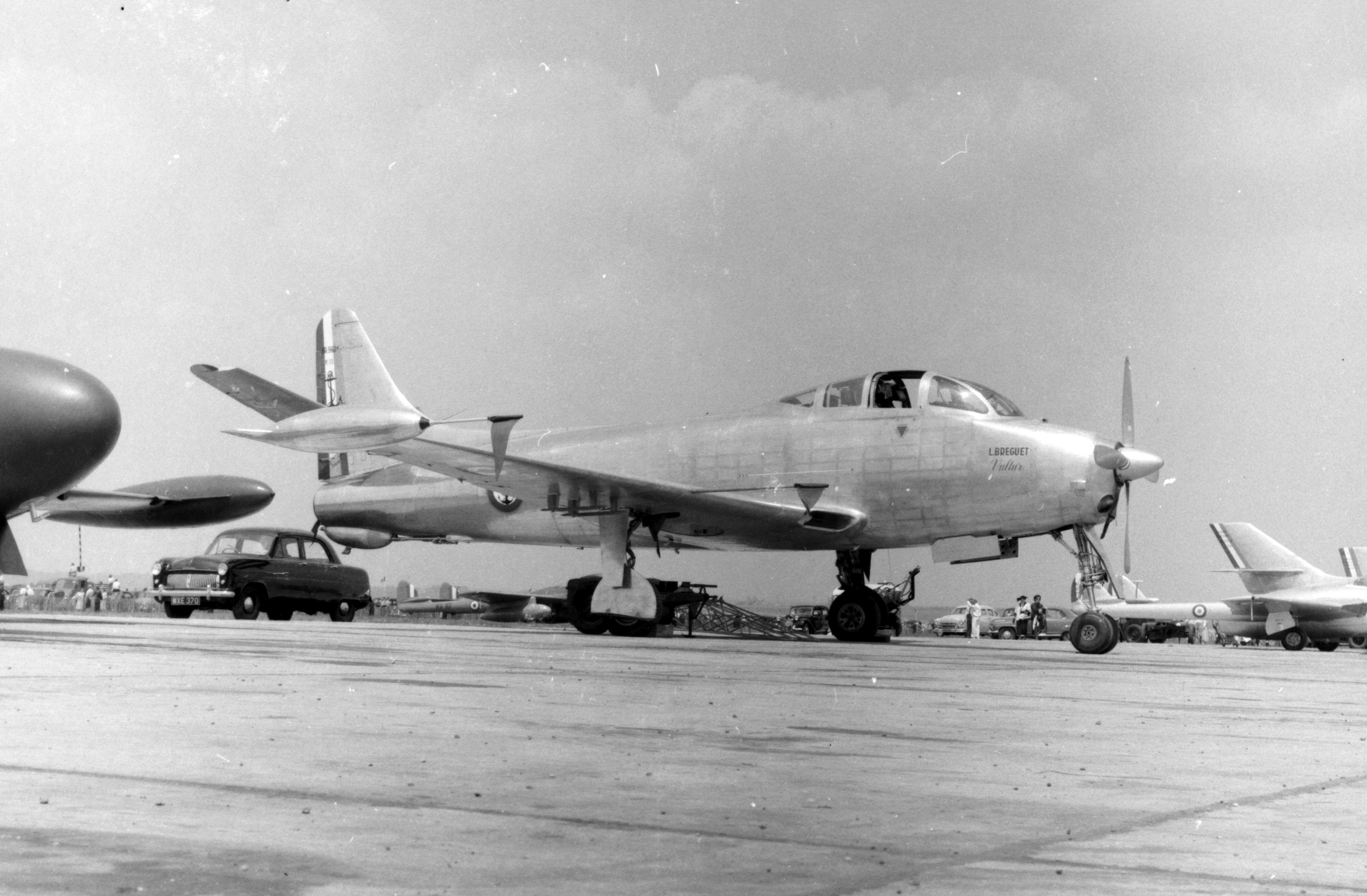
Bréguet 960 Vultur at 1953 Paris Air Show

Br 960

- Two prototypes built.

Br 960F1

- Bréguet proposal for an aerial "hunter/killer" model much like the American Grumman AF Guardian, with one version only equipped with a surface-search radar and the other had an enlarged bomb bay for more weapons. Reverted to a conventional landing gear to save weight.

Br 960F2

- Similar to the F1, but retained the tricycle landing gear.

Br 961

- "De-navalized" single-seat version proposed for the French Air Force (Armée de l'Air) with one 30-millimetre (1.2 in) autocannon in each wing.

Br 962

- Proposed version of the Br 961 with a wing with more sweep and a more powerful engine.

Br 962 ASW

- Design with an enlarged cabin, a single Mamba VI engine and an AS 33B radar in the left wingtip nacelle.

Br 963

- The first prototype modified to conduct tests with a circulation control wing.

Br 965 Épaulard

- The second prototype rebuilt for the ASW role and served as the prototype of the Bréguet Alizé.

== Specifications (Br.960, second prototype) ==
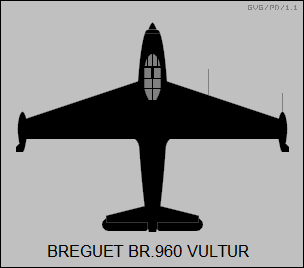
Plan view of the Br.960

Data from X-Planes of Europe II; Les Avions Breguet (1940/1971)

General characteristics

- Crew: 2
- Length: 13.35 m (43 ft 10 in)
- Wingspan: 16.7 m (54 ft 9 in)
- Wing area: 36.3 m^{2} (391 sq ft)
- Max takeoff weight: 9,800 kg (21,605 lb)
- Powerplant: 1 × Armstrong Siddeley A.S.Ma.3 Mamba III turboprop, 970 kW (1,300 hp)
- Powerplant: 1 × Rolls-Royce Nene 104 turbojet, 22.2 kN (5,000 lbf) thrust
- Propellers: 4-bladed Rotol constant-speed propeller, 2.8 m (9 ft 2 in) diameter

Performance

- Maximum speed: 900 km/h (560 mph, 490 kn) turboprop and jet
- Maximum Speed: 400 km/h (249 mph) on turboprop power only
- Service ceiling: 12,800 m (42,000 ft)

Armament

- 1 × 450 kg (1,000 lb) bomb
- 8 × rockets

== See also ==
Related development

- Bréguet 1050 Alizé

Aircraft of comparable role, configuration, and era

- Grumman AF Guardian
