= VS-25 =

Anti-Submarine Squadron 25
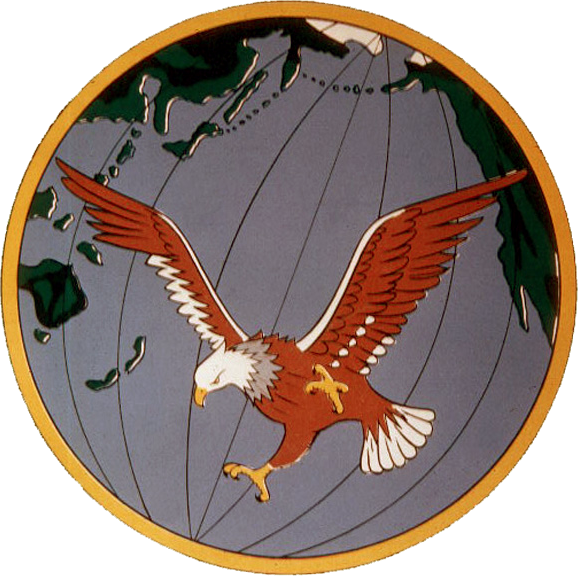
- VS-25 squadron patch
- Active: 1 April 1949 – 27 September 1968
- Country: United States
- Branch: United States Navy
- Role: Anti-submarine warfare
- Part of: Inactive
- Nickname(s): Golden Eagles
- Engagements: Korean War; Vietnam War

VS-25 was an Anti-Submarine Squadron of the U.S. Navy. Originally established as Composite Squadron 25 (VC- 25) on 1 April 1949, it was redesignated Anti-Submarine Squadron (VS-25) on 20 April 1950 and disestablished on 27 September 1968.

== Operational history ==
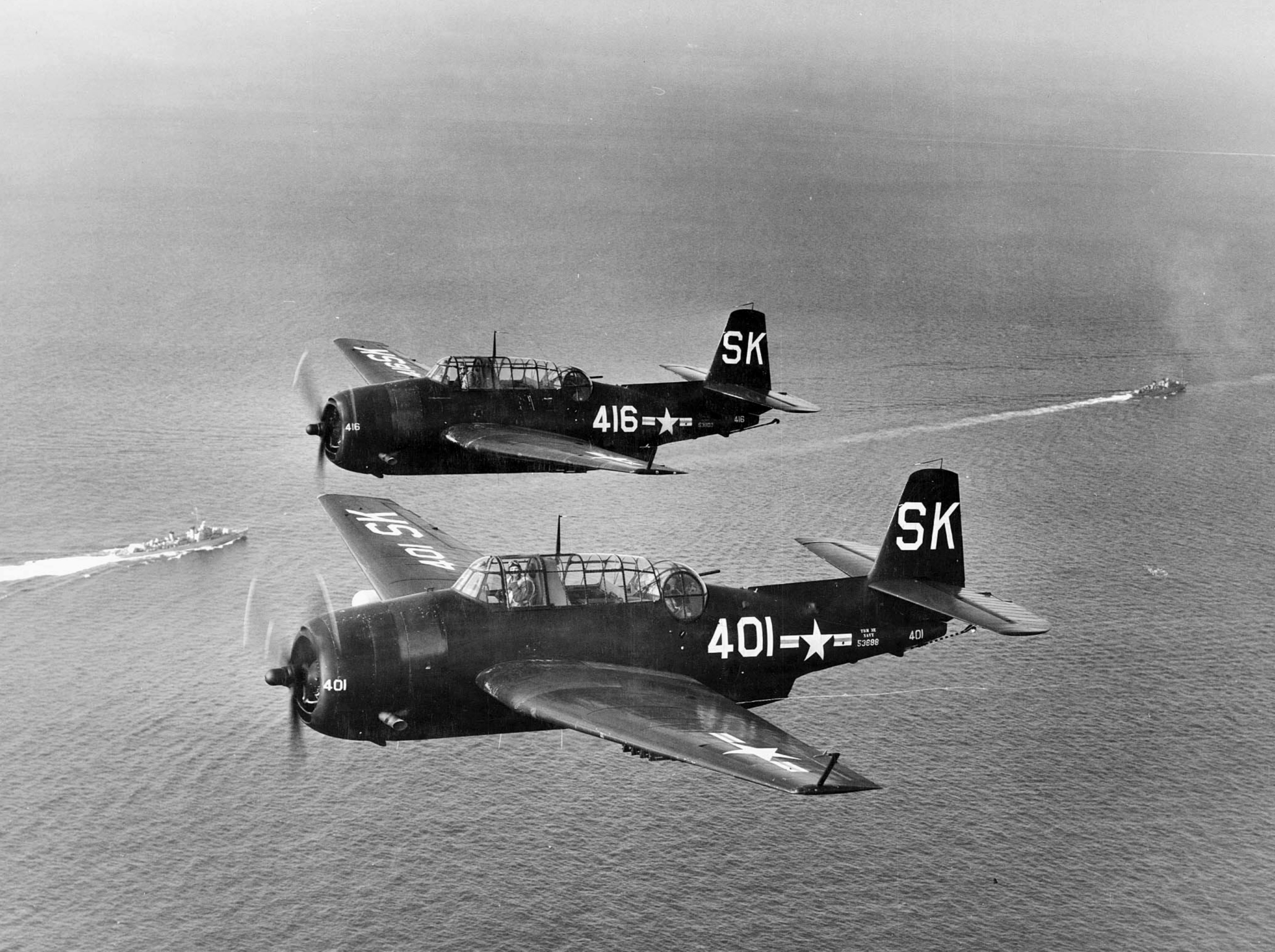
VS-25 TBM-3E Avengers in flight c.1950

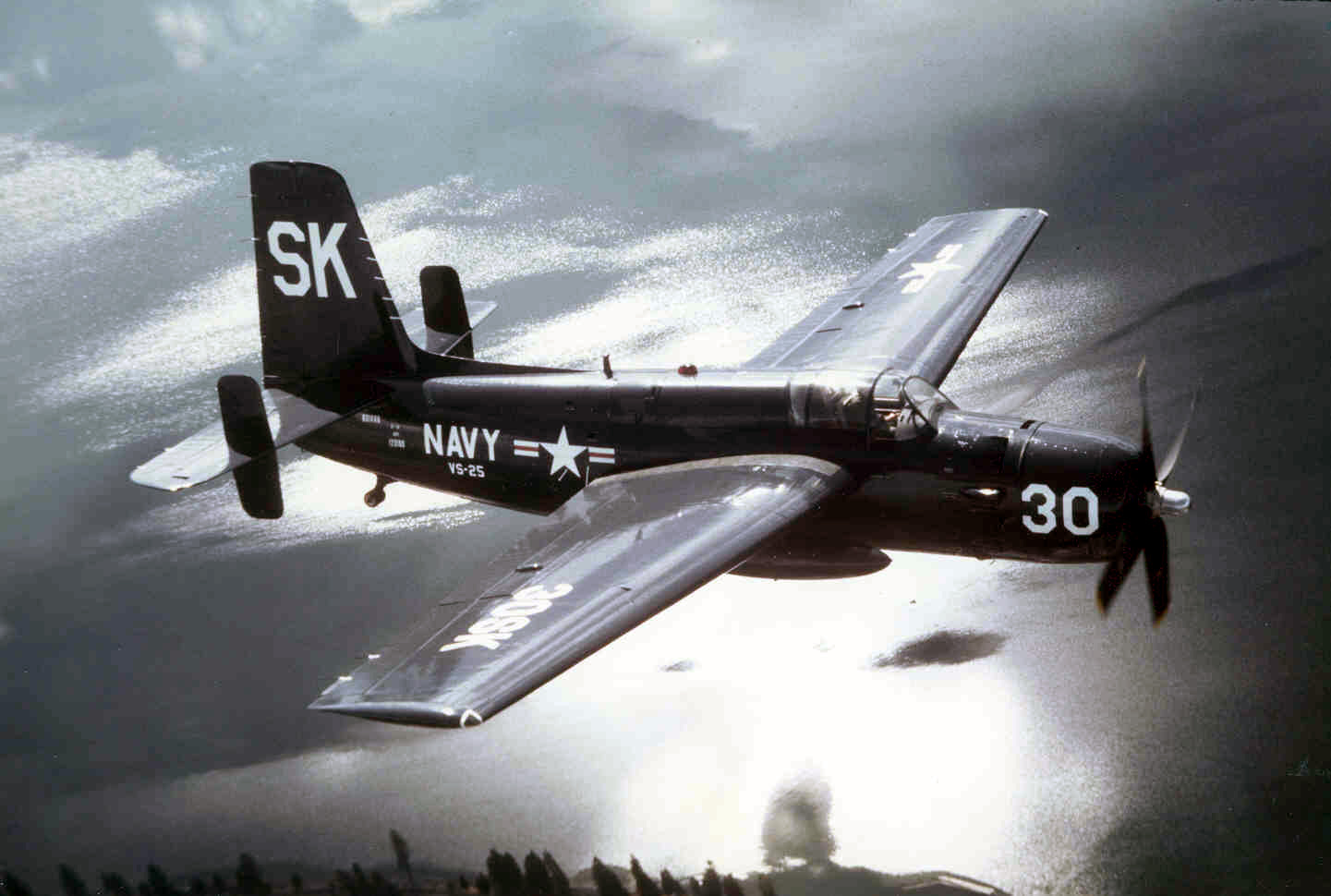
National Naval Aviation Museum AF Guardian in the colors of VS-25 in 1980

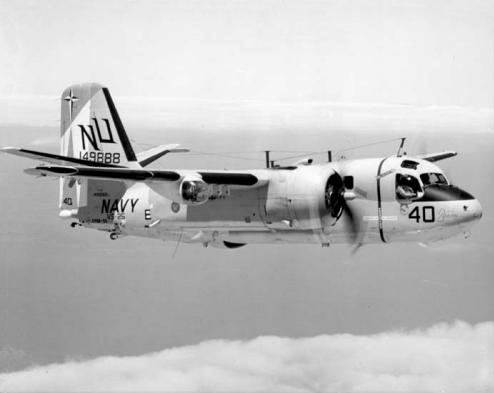
VS-25 S-2E Tracker in flight in 1967

The squadron was the second to be equipped with the Grumman AF Guardian.

VS-25 was embarked on the USS Bairoko when it was deployed to Korea from 1 December 1951 to 10 June 1952.

From 1961 to 1968, VS-25 and VS-23 were part of Carrier Anti-Submarine Air Group 55 (CVSG-55), assigned to the USS Yorktown (CVS-10)

VS-25 was embarked on USS Yorktown for three Vietnam deployments:

- 23 October 1964 – 16 May 1965
- 6 January-27 July 1966
- 28 December 1967 – 5 July 1968

== Home port assignments ==
The squadron was assigned to these home ports:

- NAS North Island

== Aircraft assignment ==
- TBM-3E Avenger
- AF Guardian
- S-2 Tracker

== See also ==
- List of inactive United States Navy aircraft squadrons
- History of the United States Navy
