= Bréguet 1050 Alizé =

French carrier based anti-submarine warfare aircraft

Br.1050 Alizé
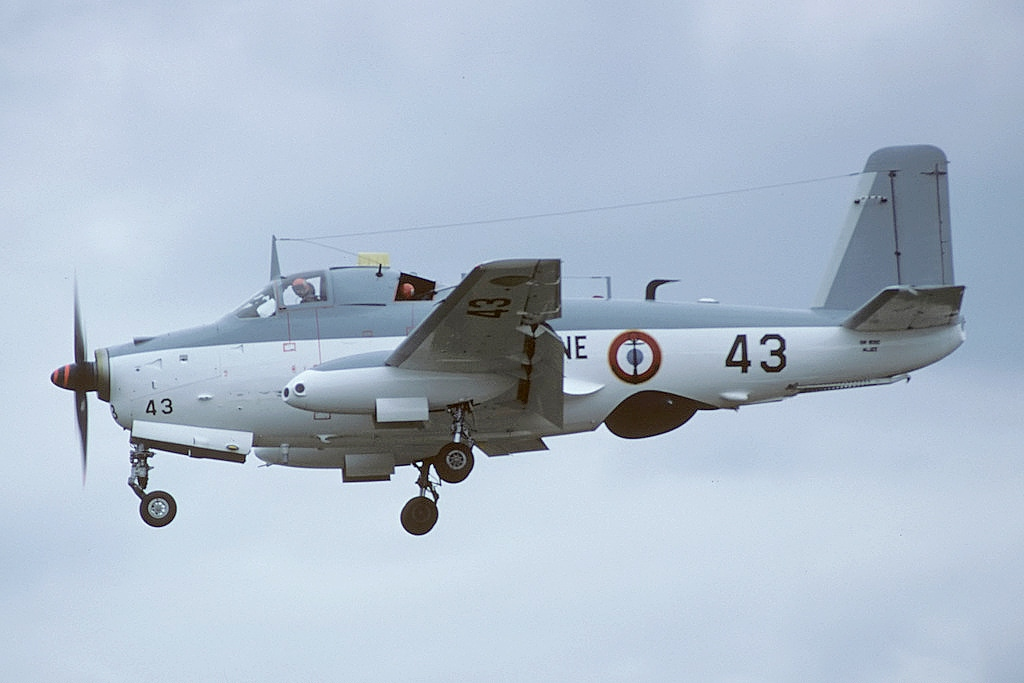

General information
- Type: Anti-submarine aircraft
- National origin: France
- Manufacturer: Bréguet Aviation
- Primary users: French Navy Indian Navy
- Number built: 89

History
- Manufactured: 1957–1962
- Introduction date: 29 May 1959
- First flight: 6 October 1956
- Retired: 2000

The Bréguet Br.1050 Alizé (French: "Tradewind") is a French carrier-based anti-submarine warfare aircraft. It was developed in the 1950s, based loosely on the second prototype Bréguet Vultur attack aircraft which had been modified into the Bréguet Br.965 Épaulard anti-submarine warfare aircraft.

== Design ==
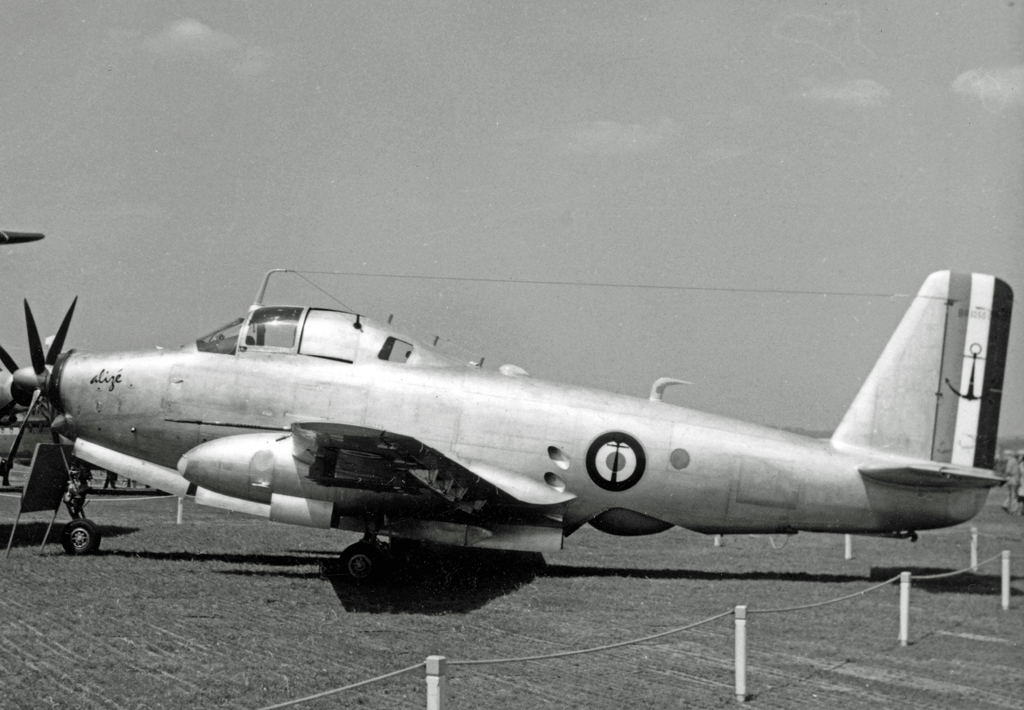
The prototype Alizé at the 1957 Paris Air Show wearing Aéronavale markings

The Alizé was a low-wing monoplane of conventional configuration powered by a single Rolls-Royce Dart turboprop engine. It had a CSF radar system with a retractable antenna dome in its belly. The cockpit accommodated a crew of three, including pilot, radar operator, and sensor operator. The pilot was seated in front on the left, the navigator in front on the right, and the sensor operator sat sideways behind them. The landing gear was of tricycle configuration, with the main gear retracting forwards into nacelles in the wings. The main gear had dual wheels, and the front part of the nacelles accommodated sonobuoys. The Alizé had a yoke-style arresting hook.

The internal weapons bay could accommodate a homing torpedo or depth charges, and underwing stores pylons could carry bombs, depth charges, rockets, or missiles. Typical underwing stores included 68 mm (2.68 in) rocket pods or AS.12 wire-guided antiship missiles.

== Operational history ==
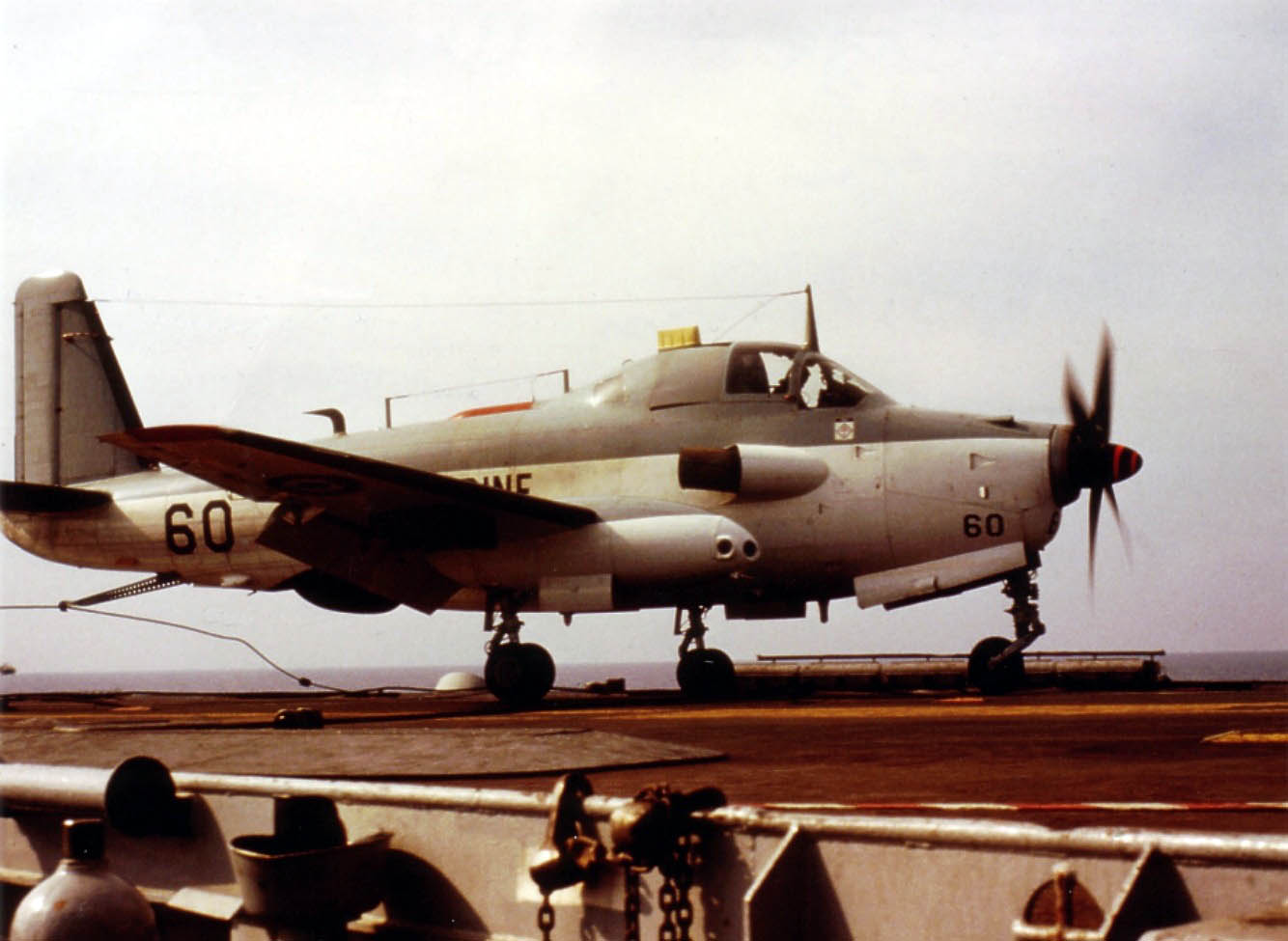

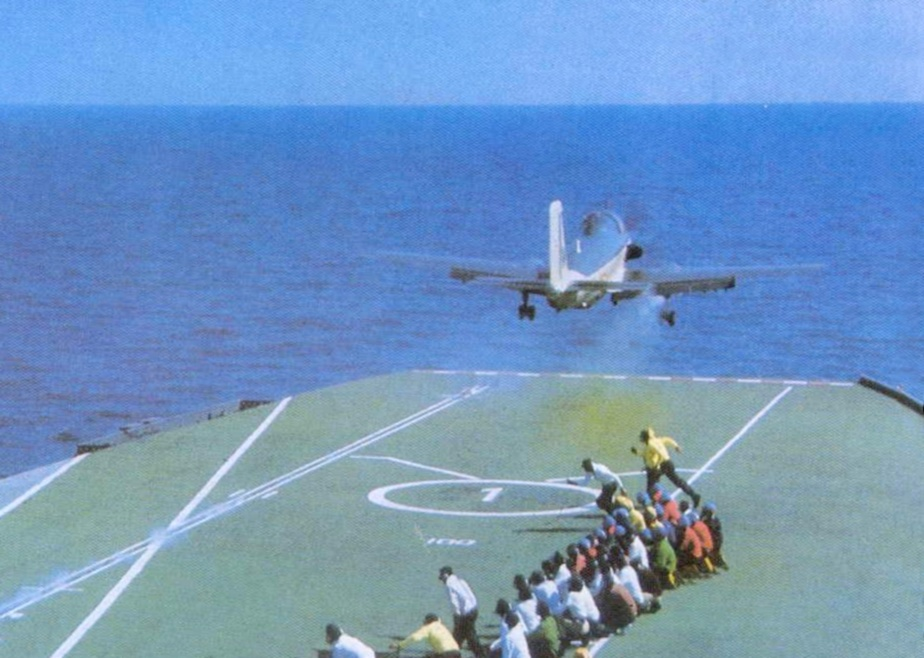
Indian light aircraft carrier INS Vikrant launching an Alize during the 1971 Indo-Pakistani war

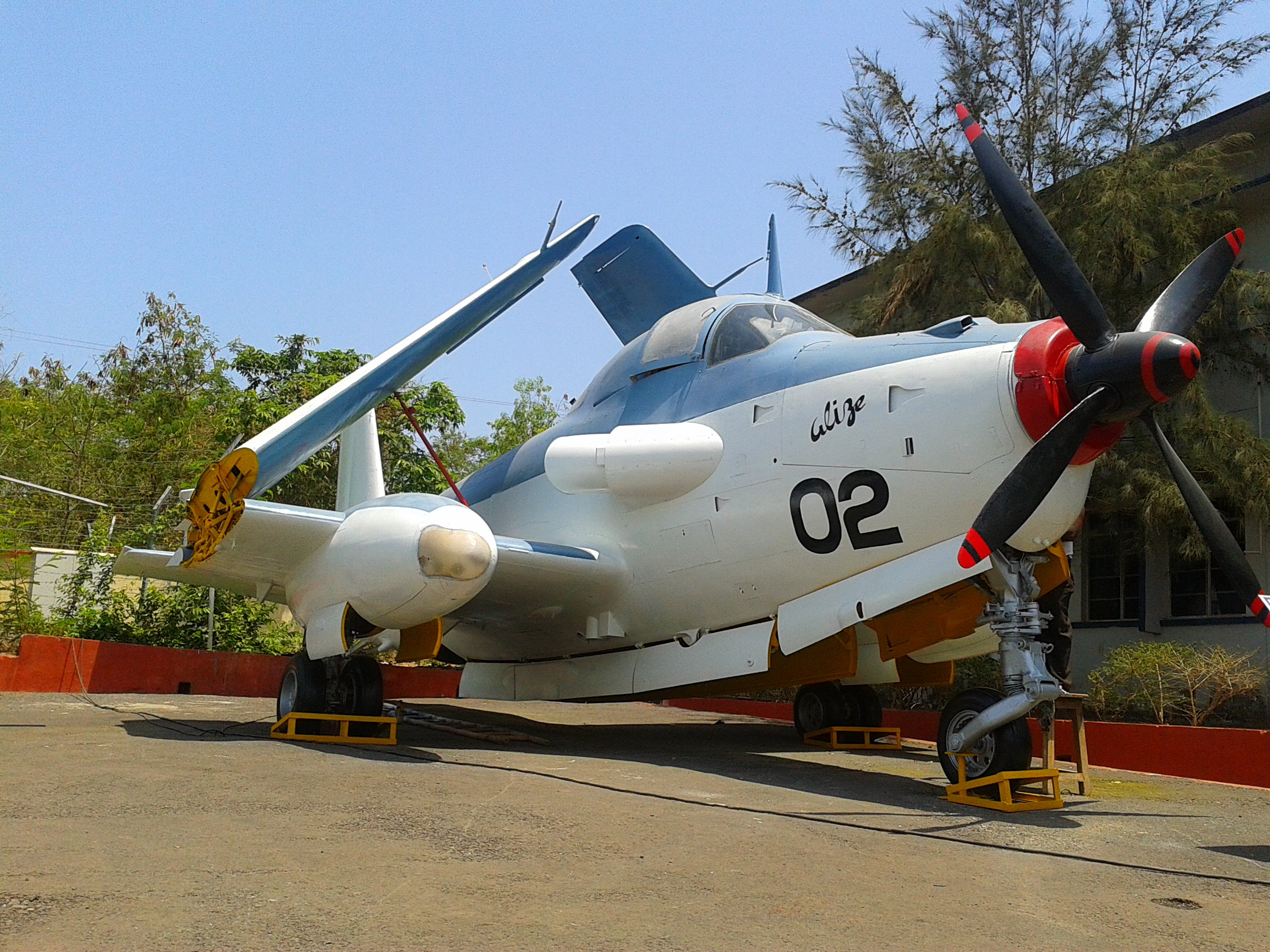
Bréguet Br.1050 Alizé displayed at the Naval Aviation Museum, Goa, India

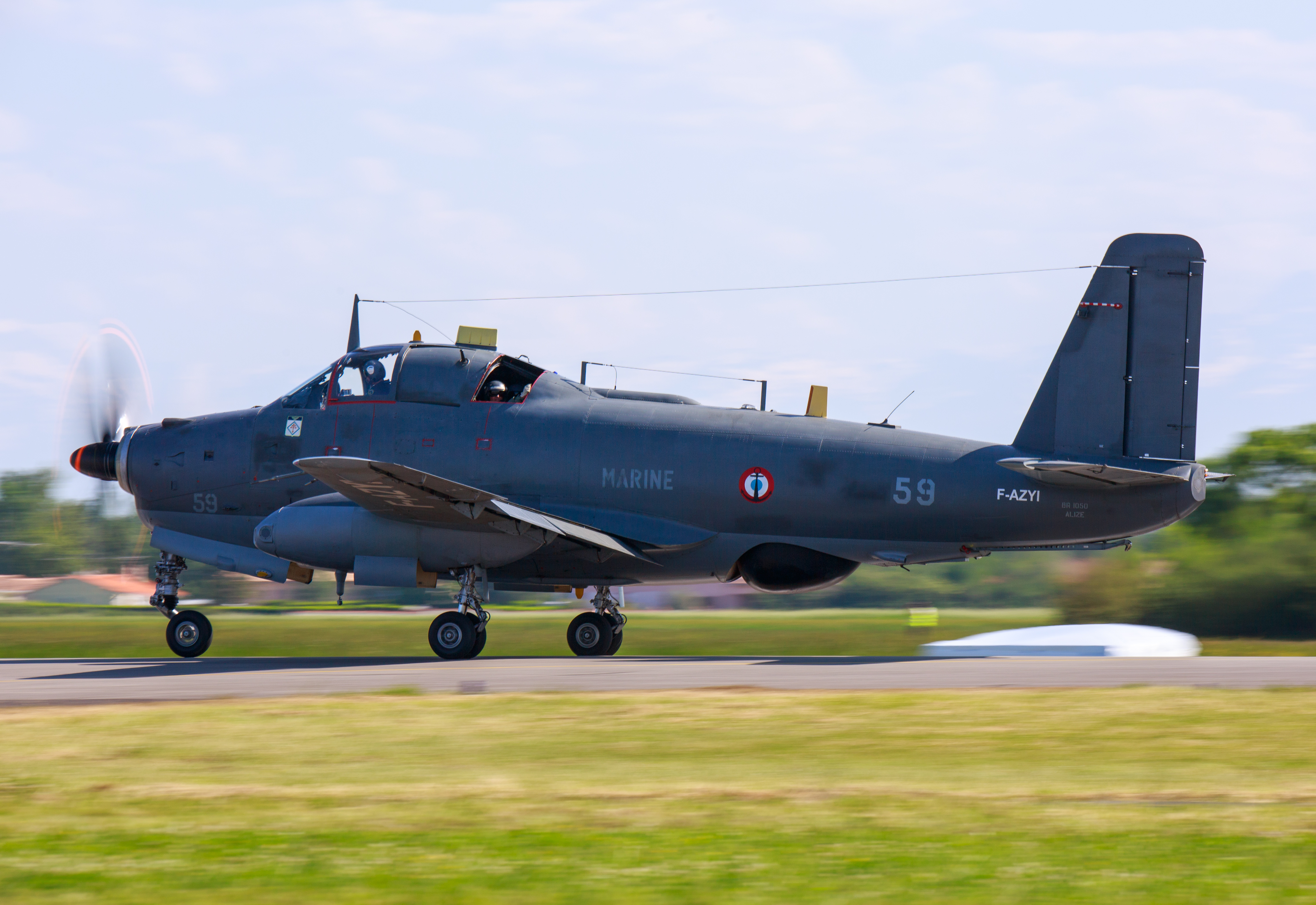
Last airworthy Alizé at Muret, 2016

The prototype Alizé first flew on 6 October 1956. It was exhibited at the Paris Air Show at Paris Le Bourget Airport in May 1957.

A total of 89 examples of the Alizé were built between 1957 and 1962, including two preproduction prototypes. 75 production aircraft were acquired by the Aéronavale, with initial service delivery in March 1959. The Alizé went into operation on the carriers Arromanches, Clémenceau and Foch, and were also used in shore-based training. 12 were acquired by the Indian Navy. Some sources say that there were five preproduction prototypes, which may mean some of the prototypes were brought up to production standard and passed on to the Aéronavale; and that India acquired 17 examples, which hints that they bought five used aircraft from the Aéronavale.

The Indian Navy had bought fourteen units for Patrol duties, with the first being delivered on 7 January 1961 and commissioned on 24th March that year. India operated the Alizé from shore bases and from the light carrier INS Vikrant.

The Alizé was used for reconnaissance and patrol during India's 1961 annexation of Portuguese controlled Goa. The aircraft conducted maritime patrol, photo reconnaissance missions. Two Alizes were deputed to TERLS from 1964, conducted observation for sounding rocket launches from the facility. During the 1965 Indo-Pakistan War, Alizes were used on Maritime patrol and ELINT duties off the cities of Mumbai and Cochin. Alizes also flew overland in Punjab, aiding IAF aircraft in detection of Radar facilities. A detachment of Alizes also tailed the Pakistani task force that undertook Operation Dwaraka, although no combat missions were taken.

Indian Alizes were used for ASW patrol during the Indo-Pakistani War of 1971, during which one Alizé was shot down by a Pakistan Air Force F-104 Starfighter. It also sank three gunboats, being the only night capable aircraft aboard INS Vikrant. The alize flew 300 sorties in the war.The Alizé dwindled in numbers in the Indian Navy during the 1980s, was relegated to shore-based patrol in mid-1987 when INS Vikrant was converted to a STOVL carrier to support the Sea Harrier. Nevertheless, they were employed that year in support of the Indian Peacekeeping Force's Operation Pawan in Sri Lanka, flying sorties from INS Garuda and Madurai against LTTE targets and crippling the merchant ship Progress Light during Operation Cactus. The type was finally phased out in 1991, replaced in its duties by ASW helicopters. One Alize was subsequently preserved at the Naval Aviation Museum in Goa.

The Aéronavale provided the Alizé with a series of upgrades. A modernization program performed in the early 1980s refitted 28 of the aircraft to the Br.1050M standard, featuring improved Thomson-CSF Iguane radar as used on the Atlantique NG ocean-patrol aircraft, new OMEGA radio navigation gear, and a new ARAR 12 radar and radio location ("electronic support measures / ESM") system.

Another upgrade program in the early 1990s fitted 24 of these aircraft with a new decoy system; a microcomputer-based data processing system; a datalink system; and other new avionics. Later in the decade, they were also fitted with the Thomson-CSF TTD Optronique Chlio forward-looking infrared (FLIR) imaging sensor. Despite the upgrades, by this time the Alizé was clearly not capable of hunting modern nuclear submarines, and so it was relegated to ocean surface patrol.

As late as 1997, the Aéronavale was still operating 24 examples for surface patrol. The Alizé was used operationally during the NATO air campaign against Yugoslavia over Kosovo in early 1999, with the aircraft flying off the carrier Foch. The last Alizé was withdrawn from service in 2000 with the retirement of the Foch.

== Operators ==
France

- Aéronavale
  - Flottille 4F
  - Flottille 6F
  - Flottille 9F
  - Escadrille 2S
  - Escadrille 3S
  - Escadrille 10S
  - Escadrille 59S

India

- Indian Naval Air Arm
  - INAS 310

== Specifications (Bréguet Alizé) ==
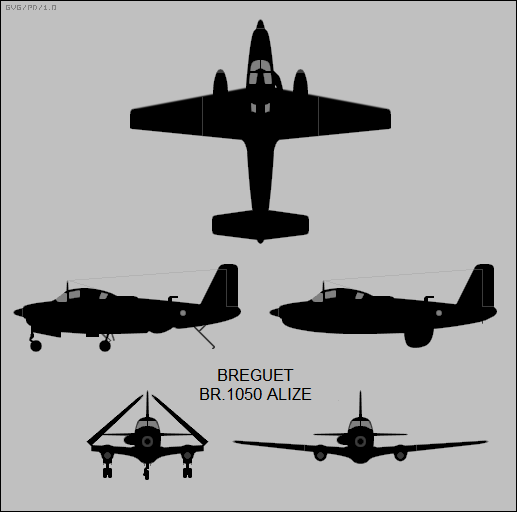

Data from Jane's Civil and Military Upgrades 1994-95

General characteristics

- Crew: 3 (pilot, radar operator, navigator)
- Length: 13.86 m (45 ft 6 in)
- Wingspan: 15.6 m (51 ft 2 in)
- Height: 5 m (16 ft 5 in)
- Wing area: 36 m^{2} (390 sq ft)
- Empty weight: 5,700 kg (12,566 lb)
- Max takeoff weight: 8,200 kg (18,078 lb)
- Powerplant: 1 × Rolls-Royce RDa.7 Dart Mk 21 turboprop, 1,565 kW (2,099 hp)
- Propellers: 4-bladed constant-speed fully-feathering reversible propeller

Performance

- Maximum speed: 518 km/h (322 mph, 280 kn) at 3,050 m (10,007 ft)

460 km/h (290 mph; 250 kn) at sea level

- Cruise speed: 240–370 km/h (150–230 mph, 130–200 kn)
- Range: 2,500 km (1,600 mi, 1,300 nmi)
- Endurance: 5 hr 10 min
- Service ceiling: 8,000 m (26,000 ft)
- Rate of climb: 7 m/s (1,400 ft/min)
- Wing loading: 229 kg/m^{2} (47 lb/sq ft)
- Power/mass: 0.20 kW/kg (0.12 hp/lb)

Armament

- Torpedo or depth charges carried in internal bay
- Bombs, depth charges, rockets, or missiles carried on underwing pylons

== See also ==
Related development

- Bréguet Épaulard
- Breguet Vultur

Aircraft of comparable role, configuration, and era

- Douglas A2D Skyshark
- Fairey Gannet
- Short Seamew
- Tupolev Tu-91

Related lists

- List of military aircraft of France

== Bibliography ==
- Cuny, Jean (1989). Les avions de combat français, 2: Chasse lourde, bombardement, assaut, exploration [French Combat Aircraft 2: Heavy Fighters, Bombers, Attack, Reconnaissance]. Docavia (in French). Vol. 30. Ed. Larivière. OCLC 36836833.
- Cuny, Jean & Leyvastre, Pierre (1977). Les Avions Breguet (1940/1971) [Breguet Aircraft (1940/1971)]. Docavia (in French). Vol. 6. Paris: Editions Larivière. OCLC 440863702.
- Lacaze, Henri (2016). Les avions Louis Breguet Paris [The Aircraft of Louis Breguet, Paris] (in French). Vol. 2: le règne du monoplan. Le Vigen, France. ISBN 978-2-914017-89-3.
- Michell, Simon. (editor). Jane's Civil and Military Aircraft Upgrades 1994-95. Coulsdon, UK:Jane's Information Group, 1994. ISBN 0-7106-1208-7.
- The initial version of this article was based on a public domain article from Greg Goebel's Vectorsite.
