= VS-23 =

Anti-Submarine Squadron 23
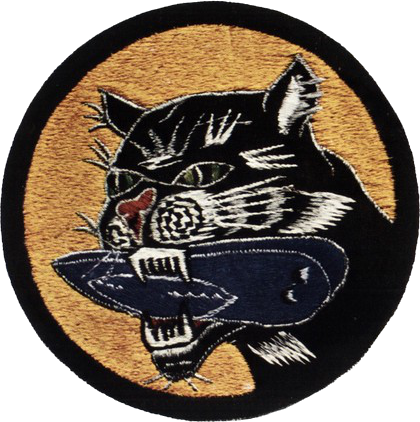
- VS-23 squadron patch
- Active: 1950s-27 September 1968
- Country: United States
- Branch: United States Navy
- Role: Anti-submarine warfare
- Part of: Inactive
- Nickname(s): Black Cats
- Engagements: Korean War; Vietnam War

VS-23 was an Anti-Submarine Squadron of the U.S. Navy. It was disestablished on 27 September 1968.

== Operational history ==
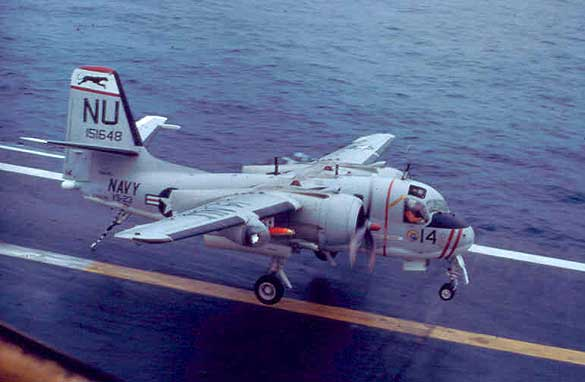
VS-23 S-2 Tracker lands on USS Yorktown c.1964

From 19 June-2 December 1958, VS-23 was assigned to USS Princeton for a Western Pacific deployment.

From 1961-68, VS-25 and VS-25 Golden Eagles were part of Carrier Anti-Submarine Air Group 55 (CVSG-55), assigned to USS Yorktown.

VS-23 was embarked on USS Yorktown for three Vietnam deployments:

- 23 October 1964 – 16 May 1965
- 6 January-27 July 1966
- 28 December 1967 – 5 July 1968

On 17 March 1968, an S-2E disappeared on a night anti-submarine patrol. Four days later, aircraft wreckage was recovered, and assumed to be from the plane. All four crewmen were listed as killed in action, but their bodies were never recovered.

== Home port assignments ==
The squadron was assigned to these home ports:

- NAS North Island
- Los Alamitos NAS, Los Alamitos, California

== Aircraft assignment ==
- TBM Avenger
- S-2 Tracker

== See also ==
- List of inactive United States Navy aircraft squadrons
- History of the United States Navy
