= 1945 in aviation =

This is a list of aviation-related events from 1945:

== Events ==
- The probe-and-drogue aerial refueling system, in which the tanker aircraft trails a hose with a stabilizing conical drogue at its end which mates to a fixed probe mounted on the receiving aircraft, is perfected. It is superior to and replaces the looped-hose system which had been in use since 1934, and it remains in use today.
- With its runways repaired Leningrad′s Shosseynaya Airport (the future Pulkovo Airport) reopens; it had been closed since 1941 because of the proximity of German forces during the Siege of Leningrad. Only cargo and mail flights will take place until February 1948, when scheduled passenger service finally will resume.
- Iraqi Airways is founded. It will begin flight operations in January 1946.

=== January ===
- January 1 – The Luftwaffe targets Allied airfields in Europe in "Operation Bodenplatte", occurring during the German withdrawal from the Battle of the Bulge.
- January 2
  - Japanese aircraft attack United States Army Air Forces B-29 Superfortress bases on Saipan for the last time.
  - U.S. Army Air Forces Twentieth Air Force B-29s based at Calcutta, India, bomb Bangkok, Siam.
  - Admiral Sir Bertram Ramsay dies in the crash just after takeoff of a Lockheed Hudson at Toussus-le-Noble, France.
- January 3 – The United States Navy creates its first aircraft carrier task group devoted to night flying, Task Group 38.5, consisting of the carriers USS Enterprise and USS Independence and six destroyers.
- January 3–4 – U.S. Navy Task Force 38 begins its support of the U.S. invasion of Lingayen Gulf with carrier air strikes against Japanese forces and facilities on Formosa, the Pescadores, the Sakishima Gunto, and Okinawa, with the loss of 22 U.S. aircraft. Bad weather curtails the strikes and makes bomb damage assessment impossible, although the task force believes it has destroyed about 100 Japanese aircraft.
- January 4
  - A single Japanese bomber destroys 11 U.S. Navy PV-1 Ventura patrol aircraft parked at Tacloban Airfield on Leyte.
  - The escort carrier USS Ommaney Bay is fatally damaged by a Japanese kamikaze in the Sulu Sea and scuttled later in the day.
  - The Japanese make their last kamikaze attack on the U.S. invasion force off Mindoro, causing a cargo ship carrying ammunition to explode, killing all 71 merchant mariners on board.
- January 5 – Kamikazes damage the U.S. escort carrier USS Manila Bay and heavy cruiser USS Louisville and the Australian heavy cruiser HMAS Australia in the South China Sea west of Manila Bay.
- January 6
  - Twentieth Air Force B-29s raid the Ōmura aircraft factory on Kyushu.
  - Task Force 38 carrier aircraft attack Japanese forces and facilities on Luzon, claiming 14 Japanese aircraft destroyed in the air and 18 on the ground in exchange for the loss of 17 U.S. aircraft, but bad weather prevents them from employing the "Big Blue Blanket" tactic of maintaining continuous coverage over Japanese airfields to prevent Japanese aircraft from attacking the U.S. invasion force in Lingayen Gulf. In Lingayen Gulf, kamikazes damage the battleship USS New Mexico, killing 30 – including British Lieutenant General Herbert Lumsden – the battleship USS California, the heavy cruiser USS Louisville – mortally wounding Rear Admiral Theodore E. Chandler – the heavy cruiser HMAS Australia, the light cruiser USS Columbia, three destroyers, a destroyer-minesweeper, and a destroyer-transport and sink a destroyer-minesweeper.
- January 7
  - In clearer weather, Task Force 38 aircraft employ the "Big Blue Blanket" tactic over Luzon, flying 757 sorties, shooting down all four Japanese aircraft that they meet in the air and claiming another 75 destroyed on the ground. Task Force 38 loses 10 planes in combat and 18 due to non-combat causes. Eleven U.S. escort carriers in Lingayen Gulf contribute another 143 sorties, and U.S. Army Air Forces planes also participate. In Lingayen Gulf, kamikazes sink a destroyer and a destroyer-minesweeper.
  - The second-highest-scoring American ace of World War II, U.S. Army Air Forces Major Thomas McGuire, is killed when his P-38 Lightning stalls at low altitude and crashes during a dogfight with a Japanese Nakajima Ki-43 (Allied reporting name "Oscar") fighter near Manapla over Negros Island in the Philippines. He has 38 kills at the time of his death.
- January 8
  - A kamikaze again damages the heavy cruiser HMAS Australia in Lingayen Gulf. Out in the South China Sea, kamikazes damage the escort carriers USS Kadashan Bay and USS Kitkun Bay and an attack transport.
  - The Pan American World Airways Martin M-130 flying boat China Clipper, operating as Flight 161, strikes a blacked-out boat and crashes while landing at Port-of-Spain, Trinidad and Tobago, killing between 23 and 25 of the 30 people on board.
- January 9
  - U.S. forces invade Luzon, landing at Lingayen Gulf. During the day, kamikazes attacking ships in the gulf damage the battleship USS Mississippi and the light cruiser USS Columbia.
  - Task Force 38 carrier aircraft strike Japanese targets at Formosa and Miyako-jima in foul weather, flying 717 sorties and dropping 212 tons (192,325 kg) of bombs. They shoot down all four Japanese aircraft they encounter in the air and claim 42 more on the ground, in exchange for the loss of 10 U.S. aircraft. They also sink a number of merchant ships and small naval craft. It is the last of seven days of Task Force 38 support to the Lingayen landings, during which it has flown 3,030 combat sorties, dropped 9,110 bombs – totaling about 700 tons (635,036 kg) of bombs – and lost 46 planes in combat and 40 to non-combat causes.
  - B-29s based at Kunming, China, attack Japanese shipping along the coast of Formosa, while Mariana Islands-based B-29s drop 122 tons (110,678 kg) of bombs on Japan.
- January 11 – U.S. Army Air Forces Twentieth Air Force B-29s based at Calcutta bomb Singapore.
- January 12 – With 850 aircraft aboard its carriers, Task Force 38 strikes targets along a 420-nautical mile (778-km) stretch of the coast of French Indochina, flying 1,465 sorties; sinking 12 tankers, 17 other merchant ships, the disarmed French cruiser La Motte-Picquet, and 15 Japanese naval vessels, including the light cruiser Kashii; and destroying 15 Japanese aircraft in the air, 77 on the ground, and 20 floatplanes on Camranh Bay in exchange for the loss of 23 U.S. aircraft.
- January 12–13 – Kamikazes resume attacks in Lingayen Gulf, damaging a destroyer escort, a destroyer-transport, an attack transport, and several merchant ships.
- January 13 – A kamikaze damages the escort carrier USS Salamaua in the South China Sea off the mouth of Lingayen Gulf. It is the last successful kamikaze attack in the waters of the Philippine Islands.
- January 14 – U.S. Army Air Forces Twentieth Air Force B-29s bomb Formosa.
- January 15
  - Task Force 38 carrier aircraft in bad weather strike Japanese forces in China, Formosa, and the Pescadores, sinking two destroyers, a transport, and a tanker and destroying 16 Japanese aircraft in the air and 18 on the ground in exchange for the loss of 12 U.S. aircraft.
  - The German submarine U-1172 torpedoes the British escort aircraft carrier HMS Thane in the Irish Sea near the Clyde Lightvessel. Thane never became seaworthy again.
- January 16
  - Task Force 38 aircraft strike Hong Kong, Hainan, and Canton and sweep the coast of China from the Liuchow Peninsula to Swatow. Hampered by bad weather, they sink two merchant ships and damage four others and destroy 13 Japanese planes in exchange for the loss of 22 U.S. aircraft in combat and five to non-combat causes.
  - U.S. Navy escort carrier support to the Lingayen Gulf landings ends. During 12 days of support, their aircraft have flown 6,152 sorties and claimed 92 Japanese aircraft destroyed in exchange for the loss of two aircraft, both FM Wildcat fighters.
  - The new British Pacific Fleet departs Ceylon for Australia.
- January 16–20 – The U.S. Army Air Forces Fourteenth Air Force destroys over 100 Japanese planes on the ground in and around Shanghai, China.
- January 17 – Twentieth Air Force B-29s bomb Formosa.
- January 21
  - Task Force 38 aircraft fly 1,164 sorties in strikes on Formosa, the Pescadores, and the Sakishima Gunto, sinking five tankers and five other merchant ships and destroying two Japanese aircraft in the air and 104 on the ground. In Japanese air attacks on the task force, a bomber damages the aircraft carrier USS Langley and kamikazes damage the carrier USS Ticonderoga and a destroyer; an accidental bomb explosion during a landing accident damages the carrier USS Hancock.
  - The British East Indies Fleet aircraft carriers HMS Ameer and HMS Shah support the landings of the 26th Indian Infantry Division on Ramree Island off the coast of Burma.
- January 22
  - Task Force 38 aircraft conduct an early morning night strike against Formosa, sinking a large tanker in exchange for the loss of three U.S. aircraft, then fly 682 sorties during daylight hours to strike and conduct photographic reconnaissance missions against Okinawa, the Sakishima Gunto, Ie Shima, and Amami O Shima, destroying 28 Japanese aircraft, all on the ground. Task Force 38 then retires to its base at Ulithi Atoll. During January 1945, its aircraft have destroyed 300,000 tons of Japanese shipping and claimed 615 Japanese planes destroyed in exchange for the loss of 201 U.S. carrier aircraft.
  - U.S. Army Air Forces aircraft begin a heavy bombing campaign against Japanese forces on Corregidor. By the time U.S. ground forces land on Corregidor on February 15–16, they will drop over 3,200 tons (2,903,021 kg) of bombs on the island.
- January 24
  - Twentieth Air Force B-29s bomb Iwo Jima.
  - British Pacific Fleet aircraft carriers launch strikes against the Japanese-controlled oil refinery at Pladjoe, Sumatra. The refinery never recovers its full capacity during World War II.
- January 26 – The British aircraft carriers HMS Ameer and HMS Shah support the landings of the Royal Marines on Cheduba Island off the coast of Burma.
- January 27 – Twentieth Air Force B-29s based at Calcutta bomb Saigon, French Indochina.
- January 29
  - Twentieth Air Force B-29s bomb Iwo Jima.
  - British Pacific Fleet aircraft carriers launch strikes against the Japanese-controlled oil refinery at Soengi Gerong, Sumatra. The refinery never recovers its full capacity during World War II. Japanese aircraft counterattack the British carriers, but the British combat air patrol shoots them all down. In the strikes on January 24 and 29 combined, the British Pacific Fleet has lost 16 aircraft to enemy action and others in accidents, as well as 30 aircrewmen, some without trace.
  - The Germans scuttle the incomplete aircraft carrier Seydlitz – the proposed name "Weser" for her had never been officially assigned – at Königsberg to prevent her capture by the Soviet Union.
- January 31
  - Part of the left wing of the Australian National Airways Stinson Model A Tokana (registration VH-UYY) separates from the aircraft at an altitude of about 1,000 feet (300 meters) as it flies near Redesdale, Victoria, Australia. The airliner crashes, killing all 10 people on board.
  - The U.S. Army Air Forces′ Seventh Air Force begins two weeks of day-and-night bombing of Iwo Jima.
  - Twentieth Air Force B-29s based at Calcutta bomb Singapore.
  - During January, B-29s raiding Japan have suffered a 5.7 percent loss rate.

=== February ===
- The U.S. Navy's first recorded use of jet-assisted take-off (JATO) takes place, when it is used to lift a PBM-5 Mariner off of a stretch of the Colorado River near Yuma, Arizona, where the Mariner had been forced down.
- Two Imperial Japanese Army Air Force Mitsubishi Ki-46-IV (Allied reporting name "Dinah") reconnaissance aircraft fly 2,301 km (1,430 statute miles) at an average speed of 700 km/h (430 mph), a notable combination of speed and endurance for the time.
- Japan's Urgent Dispersal of Plants Act orders the dispersal of Japanese industry to underground, semi-underground, and surface sites, with aircraft plants taking top priority. Although it does not become a general effort until April or May, Japanese officials predict completion of the mandated dispersal by December 1945.
- Ceremony at Boeing Wichita plant to mark delivery of the 1000th Boeing B-29 Superfortress bomber to the United States Army Air Forces.
- February 1–4 – Employing air command and control procedures pioneered by United States Marine Corps Lieutenant Colonel Keith B. McCutcheon, Marine Air Groups 24 and 32 provide highly effective close air support on Luzon for United States Army forces driving on Manila.
- February 2 – The Horten H.IX V2, the second prototype and first powered prototype of the Horten Ho 229, makes it first flight at Oranienburg, Germany. It is the world's first flight by a turbojet-powered flying wing.
- February 3 – Bound for the Kola Inlet in the Soviet Union, Convoy JW 64 becomes the first Arctic convoy to depart from the River Clyde. Its escort, designated Operation Hotbed, includes the British escort aircraft carriers HMS Campania and HMS Nairana. Campania carries the first night fighter involved in a convoy escort operation, a Fairey Fulmar equipped with aircraft interception radar.
- February 3 – The heaviest American strategic bombing raid on Berlin of the war (over one thousand bombers and 575 P-51 Mustang escorts) is carried out by the 8th Air Force, with highly decorated USAAF Lt. Col. Robert Rosenthal in command of the 8th's First Air Division Among the nearly 3,000 German lives lost in the raid, was the notorious Nazi Volksgerichtshof justice, Roland Freisler.
- February 4
  - The British Pacific Fleet arrives at Fremantle, Australia.
  - The Royal Air Force Gloster Meteor F.3 jet fighter deploys to Melsbroeck in Belgium to operate with the 2nd Tactical Air Force.
- February 6
  - SS-Obergruppenführer Hans Kammler cancels the German Henschel Hs 117 surface-to-air missile and air-to-air missile project.
  - The United States Coast Guard's efforts to develop the United States Department of the Navy's capability to use the helicopter as an antisubmarine warfare platform come to an end.
- February 7 – 12 German Junkers Ju 88s attack Convoy JW 64 during its voyage from the Clyde to the Kola Inlet. An escorting corvette shoots one down.
- February 9 – A dozen Focke-Wulf Fw 190s of Jagdgeschwader 5 attack over 30 British Commonwealth Beaufighters escorted by about a dozen Royal Air Force Mustangs over the Førde Fjord in Norway while the Allied aircraft are conducting a strike against German Navy vessels. The Allies lose eight Beaufighters and one Mustang in the failed raid, and the Germans lose several Fw 190s. Two of the Fw 190s shot down in the combat still exist, with at least one of them undergoing restoration to airworthy status.
- February 10
  - Flying the 4th Fighter Squadron P-51D Mustang Bad Angel over Batan Island in the Formosa Strait, United States Army Air Forces (USAAF) Second Lieutenant Louis Curdes spots a USAAF 39th Military Airlift Squadron C-47 Skytrain on approach to land at a Japanese airfield. After the C-47 fails to respond to his attempt to warn its pilots of their mistake, he shoots out its engines, forcing it to ditch offshore, and its passengers and crew take to life rafts. He then drops them a message telling them to keep away from the shore. He and his wingman return to base, then fly back to the rafts before dawn the next morning to cover the life rafts until a PBY-5A Catalina amphibian flying boat picks them up. Upon returning to base, he discovers that he had been out on a date with a nurse on board the plane the night before he shot it down. Although he sports an American flag on his P-51D to signify shooting down the C-47, he is not awarded an official kill, but he does receive an Oak Leaf Cluster to his Distinguished Flying Cross and the Air Medal for his actions. He becomes the only American pilot to shoot down German, Italian, Japanese, and an American aircraft during World War II.
  - German Junkers Ju 88s attack Convoy JW 64 in the Arctic Ocean.
- February 11 – A jet bomber is shot down in air-to-air combat for the first time, when a Royal Air Force Hawker Tempest Mark V downs a German Luftwaffe Arado Ar 234B Blitz (Lightning).
- February 12 – United States Army Air Forces Twentieth Air Force B-29s bomb Iwo Jima. In this raid and their January 24 and 29 raids, they have dropped a combined total of 367 tons (332,940 kg) of bombs on the island.
- February 13–15 – Allied bombers attack Dresden with incendiary weapons, destroying most of the city and killing some 50,000 people.
- February 15 – In ten weeks of steady bombardment of Iwo Jima, the U.S. Army Air Forces' Seventh and Twentieth Air Forces have dropped nearly 6,800 tons (6,168,920 kg) of bombs on the island.
- February 16
  - During the U.S. seizure of Corregidor, the United States Army's 503rd Parachute Regimental Combat Team conducts a paratrooper assault onto the island.
  - U.S. Navy surface ships conduct a two-day pre-invasion bombardment of Iwo Jima. Operating from the escort aircraft carrier USS Wake Island (CVE-65), U.S. Navy Observation Composite Squadron 1 (VOC-1) makes the Pacific Theater debut for such squadrons, in which pilots trained in artillery observation direct surface ship gunfire from fighters and torpedo bombers, augmenting or replacing the more vulnerable shipboard floatplanes carried for that purpose.
  - Flying a Focke Wulf Fw 190A-8, Luftwaffe fighter ace Otto Kittel is shot down and killed during his 583rd combat mission by return fire from a Red Air Force Ilyushin Il-2 ground-attack aircraft over the Courland Pocket southwest of Tukums in Latvia. He is credited with 267 aerial victories, making him the fourth-highest-scoring fighter pilot in history and the highest-scoring ace ever killed in action.
- February 16–17 – Eleven fleet aircraft carriers and five light aircraft carriers of the U.S. Navy's Task Force 58 conduct the first carrier-based airstrikes against Japan proper since the April 1942 Doolittle Raid, attacking targets in and around Tokyo and Tokyo Bay. U.S. Navy aircraft fly 2,761 sorties, claiming 341 Japanese planes shot down and 190 destroyed on the ground, several ships and craft sunk in Tokyo Bay, and damage to Japanese airframe and aircraft engine plants in exchange for 60 U.S. aircraft lost in combat and 28 more lost due to non-combat causes.
- February 18 – The Horten H.IX V2, the second prototype and first powered prototype of the Horten Ho 229, suffers an engine failure during its third test flight and crashes at Oranienburg, Germany, killing its pilot, Leutnant Erwin Ziller. The third prototype is never completed, and the crash brings the Ho 229 program to an end.
- February 19 – U.S. Marine Corps forces invade Iwo Jima, beginning the Iwo Jima campaign.
- February 20 – 25 German Junkers Ju 88s attack Convoy RA 64 with torpedoes as it steams from the Kola Inlet to the River Clyde. Wildcats from the British aircraft carriers HMS Campania and HMS Nairana shoot down at least three of them.
- February 20–21 (overnight) – 13 Japanese air raids strike at U.S. Fifth Fleet ships off Iwo Jima.
- February 21 – Japanese kamikaze attacks strike U.S. ships off Iwo Jima. They badly damage the aircraft carrier USS Saratoga, which suffers 123 killed and missing and 192 wounded and the loss of 42 aircraft and is out of action for three months; sink the escort carrier USS Bismarck Sea with the loss of 218 of her crew; and damage the escort carrier USS Lunga Point and netlayer USS Keokuk. Bismarck Sea is to date the last U.S. aircraft carrier sunk by enemy action.
- February 22 – The Allies launch Operation Clarion a 24-hour campaign in which nearly 9,000 Allied aircraft attack targets across Germany in an effort to destroy all means of transportation. Targets include railway marshalling yards, railway level crossings, and railway signal boxes, bridges, canal locks, and other transportation infrastructure.
- February 23 – March 2 – The night fighter squadron aboard USS Enterprise (CV-6), operating off Iwo Jima, keeps planes airborne for a record 174 consecutive hours.
- February 24 – Not realizing that Women's Auxiliary Air Force Leading Aircraftwoman Margaret Horton is still sitting on the tailplane of his Spitfire to hold it down while he taxis on a windy day at a British airfield, Flight Lieutenant Neil Cox takes off with her draped across the tail cone. Ordered to land immediately without knowing why, he returns to base and lands safely, with Horton uninjured.
- February 25
  - Carrier aircraft of the U.S. Navy's Task Force 58 strike targets around Tokyo, but bad weather forces the cancellation of many strikes.
  - Allied forces capture an intact German Arado Ar 234B Blitz (Lightning) jet bomber for the first time.
- February 26 – A U.S. Army Air Forces C-87A Liberator Express disappears during a flight from Kwajalein Atoll to Johnston Island with the loss of all on board, including two Army Air Forces generals, Lieutenant General Millard Harmon and Brigadier General James R. Andersen.
- February 27 – Off Iwo Jima, the U.S. Navy tank landing ship USS LST-776, specially equipped with booms and cables for launching light aircraft, achieves the first successful launch of an OY-1 Grasshopper observation plane (Stinson L-5).

=== March ===
- March
  - The Mexican airline Aerovias Braniff begins operations. It has a fleet of three Douglas DC-3s and flies from Mexico City and Monterrey, Mexico, to Laredo, Texas.
  - The United States Army Air Forces begins evaluation of the Radioplane OQ-17 target drone (at this time designated RP-18).
- March 1
  - Carrier aircraft of U.S. Navy Task Force 58 strike Okinawa and conduct photographic reconnaissance flights over Okinawa, Kerama Retto, Minami Daito, and Amami O Shima.
  - The world's first vertical launch of a crewed rocket takes place when the German Bachem Ba 349 Natter rocket fighter takes off under rocket power. The 55-second flight ends in tragedy when the aircraft crashes, killing its pilot, Luftwaffe test pilot Lothar Sieber.
- March 2 – German forces employ the Henschel Hs 297 surface-to-air anti-aircraft rocket system for the first time, firing it at Allied fighter-bombers in the vicinity of Remagen, Germany.
- March 4
  - Task Force 58 returns to base at Ulithi Atoll. During its two-week cruise to the Tokyo area and Okinawa its pilots have claimed 393 Japanese aircraft shot down and 250 destroyed on the ground, in exchange for the loss of 84 planes, 60 pilots, and 21 aircrewmen in combat and 59 planes, eight pilots, and six aircrewmen in non-combat incidents.
  - Low on fuel after a raid on Japan, a B-29 Superfortress lands on Iwo Jima, the first of about 2,400 B-29s to do so before World War II ends in August.
- March 5 – A Royal Australian Air Force Lockheed Hudson crashes into the Coral Sea just off the coast of Queensland, Australia, just north of the mouth of the Barron River, killing everyone on board including Australian Army Major Generals George Vasey and Rupert Downes.
- March 6 – Operation Spring Awakening, the last major German offensive of World War II, begins in Hungary. The Luftwaffe commits about 900 aircraft in support of the offensive, while 965 aircraft of the Soviet 17th Air Army support the Soviet and Bulgarian defenders.
- March 9 – Disappointed in strategic bombing results against Japan with B-29 Superfortresses employing high-altitude daylight bombing as used in Europe, the United States Army Air Forces Twentieth Air Force switches to low-altitude night bombing of Japan using incendiary bombs for the rest of World War II.
- March 9–10 – The Great Tokyo Air Raid (USAAF codename Operation Meetinghouse), an overnight incendiary bombing raid by B-29 Superfortresses on Tokyo, is the single most destructive air raid during World War II, even with the atomic bombings of Hiroshima and Nagasaki being considered as single events. It creates a conflagration which destroys 41 square kilometers (16 sq mi) of the city, killing an estimated 88,000 to 125,000 people, injuring at least 41,000 and perhaps as many as a million people, and leaving probably a million people homeless.
- March 10 – The Government of Poland recreates LOT Polish Airlines, which had not operated since 1939. It will resume operations in 1946.
- March 11 – Luftwaffe pilot Helmut Gerstenhauer and two copilots arrive at Werder, Germany, completing a flight in a Focke-Achgelis Fa 223 helicopter begun from Tempelhof Airport in Berlin on 26 February. Bound for Danzig, navigational problems and bad weather force them to stop at Crailsheim, Würzburg, and Meiningen on 26 February, Werder on 27 February (which they reach after a 315-kilometer (196-mile) flight from Meiningen), Prenzlau on 28 February, and Stolp on 1 March, before finally departing Stolp on 5 March and arriving at Danzig later that day after a flight over the advancing Soviet Army. Ordered to return to Werder, they make a lengthy flight from Danzig to Werder via Garz. The entire 13-day journey has covered 1,675 kilometers (1,041 miles) – an unofficial helicopter record at the time – with a flight time of 16 hours 25 minutes.
- March 13–14 – A Royal Air Force Avro Lancaster of No. 617 Squadron bombs the Bielefeld Viaduct in Germany in the first operational use of the 22,000-pound (10,000 kg) Grand Slam bomb.
- March 14 – Transportes Aéreos Portugueses, the future TAP Portugal, is founded. It will begin flight operations in September 1946.
- March 15
  - Luftwaffe night fighter pilot Heinz Rökker shoots down four British bombers during the evening, his last aerial victories. His final victim is a Royal Air Force Mosquito shot down over St. Trond airfield in Belgium. He finishes World War II with 64 victories, all British bombers, making him the eighth-most-successful night fighter ace in history.
  - The U.S. Navy assigns responsibility for the evacuation of wounded personnel to the Naval Air Transport Service.
- March 17 – Training for U.S. Army Air Forces service, American actor Bobby Hutchins dies in the mid-air collision of two North American AT-6 Texan trainers at Merced Army Airfield in Merced, California. The other pilot survives.
- March 18 – Carrier aircraft of the U.S. Navy's Task Force 58 strike Kyushu.
- March 19 – Task Force 58 strikes ships in Japan's Inland Sea, damaging the battleship Yamato, the aircraft carriers Amagi and Ryūhō, and 14 other ships, followed by fighter sweeps over Kyushu. Counterattacks by Japanese aircraft damage the aircraft carriers USS Wasp (CV-18), which suffers 101 killed and 269 wounded but remains in action for several more days, and USS Franklin (CV-13), which suffers 724 killed or missing and 265 wounded. Franklin survives to limp home to the United States despite near-fatal damage – probably the most severely damaged aircraft carrier every to make it back to port – and never returns to service.
- March 21 – The Imperial Japanese Navy uses its Yokosuka MXY7 Ohka ("Cherry Blossom") rocket-powered human-guided anti-shipping kamikaze attack plane operationally for the first time, but without success.
- March 22 – USS Enterprise is damaged by a flight deck fire caused by American antiaircraft fire, and Task Force 58 retires from Japanese waters. During its strikes on Kyushu and the Inland Sea it has claimed 528 Japanese aircraft destroyed; Japan admits to 163 aircraft lost in air-to-air combat and additional Japanese planes destroyed on the ground.
- March 23 – April 1 – Task Force 58 conducts strikes on Okinawa and vicinity.
- March 23 – The British Pacific Fleet, centered around the aircraft carriers HMS Indomitable, HMS Victorious, HMS Illustrious, and HMS Indefatigable, departs Ulithi Atoll to begin operations as Task Force 57 of the United States Fifth Fleet.
- March 24
  - 112 carrier aircraft of Task Force 58 sink an entire convoy of eight Japanese ships 150 nautical miles (280 kilometres) northwest of Okinawa.
  - Allied forces begin large-scale crossings of the Rhine River in Operation Varsity. The operation involves 2,000 transport aircraft and gliders.
- March 25
  - Japanese aircraft make their last raid on Iwo Jima. U.S. Army Air Forces P-61 Black Widow night fighters based on the island shoot down several of the Japanese planes and drive off the rest.
  - The Japanese high command issues an alert for Operation Ten-Go, a concentrated air attack against amphibious forces preparing to invade Okinawa.
- March 26
  - The United States declares the Iwo Jima operation "completed".
  - The British Pacific Fleet conducts its first combat operation as Task Force 57 under the command of the United States Fifth Fleet, launching airstrikes against Japanese airfields on Miyako-jima in the Sakishima Gunto.
- March 27
  - In support of the upcoming U.S. invasion of Okinawa, Twentieth Air Force B-29s strike airfields and an aircraft factory on Kyushu and lay naval mines in Shimonoseki Strait.
  - A kamikaze damages the battleship USS Nevada (BB-36) off Okinawa, killing 11 and wounding 49.
  - Flying a Yakovlev Yak-3 with a French fighter group in the Soviet Air Force, French Air Force pilot Roger Sauvage, history's only black fighter ace, scores his 16th and final victory, shooting down a German Focke-Wulf Fw 190.
  - The final V-2 missile to hit England falls in Kent.
- March 31
  - Twentieth Air Force B-29s again raid Japanese airfields on Kyushu.
  - A kamikaze damages the U.S. heavy cruiser USS Indianapolis off Okinawa, killing 9 and wounding 20.

=== April ===
- April 1
  - The Nakajima Aircraft Company comes under the control of the Japanese government and is renamed the First Munitions Arsenal.
  - Operation Iceberg, the American invasion of Okinawa, begins the Okinawa campaign. Ohkas score hits on the battleship USS West Virginia and three of her escorts, and a kamikaze hits the aircraft carrier HMS Indefatigable, the first British aircraft carrier hit by a kamikaze. Indefatigable suffers 14 killed, but resumes air operations an hour later.
- April 4 – During trials for rubber decks to be installed aboard future aircraft carriers, Royal Navy test pilot Captain Eric "Winkle" Brown declares an emergency and lands his Fleet Air Arm Bell Airacobra AH574 aboard the aircraft carrier HMS Pretoria Castle. It is the world's first carrier landing by an aircraft with retractable tricycle landing gear.
- April 6 – U.S. Navy aircraft from USS Belleau Wood, USS Bennington, and USS Hornet strike Japanese airfields and other targets on Miyako Jima and Ishigaki Jima in the Sakishima Gunto.
- April 6–7 – The Japanese begin Operation Ten-Go with the first and largest of ten major Kikusui ("Floating Chrysanthemum") kamikaze attacks against Allied naval forces off Okinawa, committing 355 kamikazes and 341 bombers. On the first day, they sink two destroyers, a destroyer-minelayer, a tank landing ship, and two civilian ammunition ships and badly damage eight destroyers, a destroyer escort, and a minelayer. The Americans claim 357 Japanese planes destroyed. On the second day, the Japanese damage the battleship USS Maryland, a destroyer, and a destroyer escort.
- April 7
  - Accompanying B-29 Superfortresses, P-51 Mustangs of the U.S. Army Air Forces' 15th, 21st, and 506th Fighter Groups based on Iwo Jima become the first Allied fighters to escort bombers all the way to Tokyo, Japan, and back. The escort flights last seven to eight hours. Fifty-four B-29s land on Iwo Jima during the day.
  - 386 carrier aircraft of Task Force 58 attack an Imperial Japanese Navy task force bound for Okinawa while it is steaming in the East China Sea, sinking the battleship Yamato, the light cruiser Yahagi, and four of their eight escorting destroyers. It ends the last offensive sortie by Japanese surface ships of World War II.
- April 8 – German test pilot Melitta Schenk Gräfin von Stauffenberg is shot down and killed, aged 42.
- April 9
  - Over 300 Royal Air Force bombers raid the dockyard at Kiel, Germany. They capsize the German "pocket battleship" Admiral Scheer with a direct hit and several near misses.
  - The United Kingdom transfers the escort carrier HMS Biter to France, which immediately commissions her into the French Navy as Dixmude. Dixmude is France's first aircraft carrier since the demilitarization of Béarn in 1942.
- April 10 – The Luftwaffe flies its final sortie over the United Kingdom, a reconnaissance mission from Norway by an Arado Ar 234.
- April 11 – British Pacific Fleet aircraft carriers launch strikes against Formosa.
- April 12–13 – The second Japanese Kikusui attack on Allied ships off Okinawa includes 145 kamikazes, which attack along with 150 fighters and 45 torpedo bombers. U.S. Navy ships and aircraft claim 298 Japanese aircraft destroyed. On April 12, the destroyer USS Mannert L. Abele becomes the first ship to be sunk by an Ohka. Kamikazes also hit the battleship USS Tennessee, four destroyers, four destroyer escorts, a destroyer-minelayer, a minesweeper, and several smaller craft.
- April 13 – British Pacific Fleet aircraft carriers launch a second strike against Formosa. During the April 11 and 13 strikes, their aircraft shoot down at least 16 Japanese planes, destroy additional Japanese aircraft on the ground, and strike airfields and road and railroad targets, for the loss of three British aircraft.
- April 14–15 (overnight) – An Avro Lancaster on a night mission against Potsdam becomes the last British bomber shot down by a German night fighter during World War II.
- April 15–16
  - Task Force 58 launches fighter sweeps over Kyushu, claiming 29 Japanese aircraft shot down and 51 destroyed on the ground on the first day.
  - The third Japanese Kikusui attack on ships off Okinawa includes 165 kamikazes. They sink the destroyer USS Pringle and a minesweeper and damage the aircraft carrier USS Intrepid, three destroyers, a destroyer escort, a minesweeper, and a landing craft.
- April 16 – The final Soviet assault against Berlin begins with strikes by 150 Soviet Air Force night bombers of the 4th and 16th Air Armies against German positions in the early morning hours, coordinated with mortar and artillery attacks. By 1500 hours, 647 Soviet combat aircraft are in the air. The day ends with the Soviet Air Force having flown 5,300 sorties, claiming 131 German aircraft shot down in exchange for 87 Soviet aircraft.
- April 18
  - A German Messerschmitt Bf 109 fighter intercepts a U.S. Army Air Forces Stinson L-5 Sentinel liaison aircraft carrying United States Army Lieutenant General Alexander M. Patch from Kitzingen to Öhringen, Germany. The L-5's pilot, Technical Sergeant Robert F. Stretton, maneuvers his aircraft skillfully enough to evade the Bf 109 and land Patch safely at Öhringen. Stretton later received the Distinguished Flying Cross for the flight.
  - The German ace Johannes Steinhoff, flying with the Luftwaffe's specialist all-jet squadron JV 44, suffers severe burns and nearly fatal injuries when his Messerschmitt Me 262 crashes on takeoff and explodes; his kill total is 176, including six while flying the Me 262, making him one of history's first jet aces. He survives and resumes flying postwar.
- April 19 – The International Air Transport Association is founded in Havana, Cuba, with 57 member airlines from 31 countries.
- April 20
  - British Pacific Fleet aircraft carriers launch strikes against the Sakishima Islands.
  - "Morotai Mutiny": members of the Australian First Tactical Air Force based on the island of Morotai in the Dutch East Indies tender their resignations to protest their belief that they are being assigned to missions of no military importance and in which they are not specialists; a subsequent inquiry effectively vindicates them.
  - A Swordfish from the merchant aircraft carrier (or "MAC-ship") MV Empire MacAndrew drops two depth charges on a periscope sighting position in the last attack on a submarine by a MAC-ship's aircraft. During World War II, no submarine makes a successful attack against a convoy containing a MAC-ship. MAC-ship aircraft have attacked 12 German submarines; although they never sink one, their activities have proven very effective in convoy defense.
- April 21 – The Focke-Wulf Fw 200KB-1 Condor Hessen (registration D-ASHH) attempts the last scheduled flight in the history of Deutsche Luft Hansa, a trip from Berlin to Munich. The airliner crashes and burns near Piesenkofen shortly before its planned arrival in Munich, killing all 21 people on board.
- April 22 – The last flight in Deutsche Luft Hansa's history, a non-scheduled flight from Berlin to Warnemünde, takes place. After Germany surrenders in May, the Allies dissolve the airline and seize its aircraft.
- April 23 – The United States Navy puts its first autonomously radar-guided bomb, the SWOD-9 "Bat" into use, dropping it from Consolidated PB4Y Liberators on Japanese shipping in Balikpapan Harbour.
- April 24 – Flying a Messerschmitt Me 262, Luftwaffe ace Günther Lützow is killed in combat with U.S. Army Air Forces P-47 Thunderbolts near Donauwörth, Germany. His credited with 110 kills.
- April 25
  - 275 B-17s escorted by four groups of P-51 Mustangs attack the Škoda Works armament factory in Plzeň, Czechoslovakia. It is the last heavy bomber mission by the United States Army Air Forces' Eighth Air Force against an industrial target.
  - The incomplete German aircraft carrier Graf Zeppelin is scuttled at Stettin to prevent her capture by the Soviet Union.
- April 26/27 (overnight) – 563 bombers of the Soviet Air Force's 18th Air Army strike Berlin.
- April 27–28 – The fourth Japanese Kikusui attack on ships off Okinawa includes 115 kamikazes. They sink an ammunition ship and damage four destroyers and the hospital ship USS Comfort.
- April 30 – May 7 – To divert Japanese attention from Operation Dracula and suppress Japanese airpower in the Andaman and Nicobar Islands, aircraft from the British aircraft carriers HMS Empress and HMS Shah fly 400 sorties over eight days against Japanese airfields and shipping in the islands, losing one aircraft.

=== May ===
- The United States Strategic Air Forces control about 17,000 aircraft and 500,000 personal in the European Theater of Operations.
- Sine it began operations on June 7, 1944, the Balkan Air Force has flown 38,340 sorties, dropped 6,650 tons of bombs, delivered 16,440 tons of supplies, and flown 2,500 individuals into Yugoslavia and 19,000 (mostly wounded) out.
- May 1 – The U.S. Navy's mixed-propulsion Ryan FR Fireball becomes the first aircraft incorporating jet propulsion to qualify for use aboard aircraft carriers.
- May 2 – The British East Indies Fleet's 21st Aircraft Carrier Squadron – consisting of the aircraft carriers HMS Emperor, HMS Hunter, HMS Khedive, and HMS Stalker – begin support of Operation Dracula, a British assault on Rangoon, Burma. Their aircraft fly 110 sorties, bombing Japanese forces in support of a British amphibious landing.
- May 2–3 – With an attack on enemy airfields, Royal Air Force Mosquitoes of No. 8 Group operate the last offensive action in the war by Bomber Command.
- May 3
  - Royal Air Force Hawker Typhoon fighter-bombers sink the German passenger ships SS Cap Arcona and SS Deutschland and the German cargo ship SS Thielbek in the Bay of Lübeck, unaware that the ships are carrying more than 10,000 concentration camp prisoners. About 5,000 people die aboard Cap Arcona (the second-greatest loss of life in a ship sinking in history) and about another 2,750 aboard Thielbek, and there also is a heavy loss of life aboard Deutschland.
  - Since March 19, the Balkan Air Force has flown 2,727 sorties, attacking the German withdrawal route in Yugoslavia from Sarajevo to Zagreb and supporting the Yugoslav Fourth Army as it advances from Bihać to Rijeka.
- May 3–4 – The fifth Japanese Kikusui attack on ships off Okinawa includes 125 kamikazes. They sink three destroyers and two smaller ships and damage the aircraft carrier HMS Formidable, the light cruiser USS Birmingham, four destroyers, a destroyer-minelayer, and three smaller ships.
- May 4
  - The British Home Fleet carries out its last operation of World War II, a raid by 44 Avengers and Wildcats from the aircraft carriers HMS Queen. HMS Trumpeter, and HMS Searcher against Kilbotn, Norway, sinking a German depot ship and submarine. It is the last air raid against Norway of World War II.
  - A strafing attack by a Royal Air Force fighter-bomber kills German Field Marshal Fedor von Bock, his second wife, and his stepdaughter as they drive in Lensahn, Germany. He is the only German field marshal killed by enemy action during World War II.
  - A Martin Marauder of the South African Air Force's 25 Squadron, operating as part of the Balkan Air Force, is shot down during the squadron's last mission of World War II. It is the last B-26 Marauder lost in action.
- May 4–5 – Carrier aircraft of the British Pacific Fleet strike airfields on the Sakishima Gunto.
- May 5–6 – The British aircraft carriers HMS Emperor, HMS Hunter, HMS Khedive, and HMS Stalker resume support of Operation Dracula, bombing Japanese forces south of Rangoon and attacking shipping off Burma's Tenasserim coast.
- May 7 – The Royal Air Force sinks a German submarine for the last time in World War II.
- May 8
  - Flying a Messerschmitt Bf 109, Luftwaffe fighter pilot Erich Hartmann scores his final aerial victory, shooting down a Soviet Yakovlev Yak-9 fighter over Brno, Slovakia. He is the highest-scoring ace in history, with 352 kills. He surrenders to Allied forces soon afterward.
  - VE Day; Germany surrenders, ending the Second World War in Europe.
  - During World War II, the U.S. Army Air Forces have lost more than 6,500 B-17 Flying Fortress and B-24 Liberator bombers over Europe. In the European Theater, they have lost 23,805 airmen killed in action, 9,299 wounded, and 26,064 captured. In the European, Mediterranean, and North African theaters combined, they have suffered 115,382 casualties.
- May 9 – British Pacific Fleet carrier aircraft strike the Sakishima Gunto. Kamikazes hit the aircraft carriers HMS Formidable and HMS Victorious.
- May 10 – Sighting a Japanese Kawasaki Ki-45 (Allied reporting name "Nick" fighter flying high over Okinawa, U.S. Marine Corps First Lieutenant Robert R, Klingman in an F4U Corsair gives chase for over 185 miles and intercepts the Ki-45 at 38,000 feet (12,000 m). Finding his guns frozen, he climbs well above the Corsair's service ceiling of 41,600 feet (12,700 m) and cuts off the Ki-45's tail with his propeller in several passes, causing it to crash. He then belly lands safely at Kadena field on Okinawa. He receives the Navy Cross for the action.
- May 10–11 – The sixth Japanese Kikusui attack off Okinawa includes 150 kamikazes. They damage two destroyers and the aircraft carrier USS Bunker Hill, which suffers 353 killed, 43 missing, and 264 wounded. One of the most heavily damaged aircraft carriers to survive the war, Bunker Hill is out of service for the rest of World War II.
- May 11 – Over three years after its first use in Germany to save test pilot Helmut Schenk's life, the Martin-Baker company makes the first live firing of one of its own ejector seat designs.
- May 12 – A kamikaze hits the battleship USS New Mexico at Hagushi anchorage, Okinawa.
- May 12–13 – Carrier aircraft of Task Force 58 strike targets on Kyushu and Shikoku. The British Pacific Fleet's carriers strike the Sakishima Gunto.
- May 14
  - A kamikaze crashes on the flight deck of the aircraft carrier USS Enterprise, knocking her out of action for the rest of World War II.
  - The final Arctic convoy of World War II, Convoy JW 67, departs Scapa Flow for the Kola Inlet in the Soviet Union escorted by the British aircraft carrier HMS Queen. It returns to the United Kingdom later in the month as Convoy RA 67. Queen's presence as an escort is deemed necessary in case any German submarine commanders opt to ignore Germany's surrender and attack the convoy.
- May 15 – Aircraft from the British aircraft carrier HMS Emperor attack the Japanese heavy cruiser Haguro in the Indian Ocean, but achieve only one near-miss.
- May 16–17 – British Pacific Fleet carrier aircraft strike Japanese airfields in the Sakishima Gunto.
- May 18 – A Corsair's guns accidentally fire in the hangar deck of the British aircraft carrier Formidable, striking an Avenger. The Avenger explodes, starting a fire that destroys 28 planes.
- May 20 – 29 aircraft from the British aircraft carriers HMS Ameer, HMS Khedive, and HMS Stalker conduct devastating strikes against Japanese shipping, airfields, and communications in southern Burma and Sumatra.
- May 23–25 – The seventh Kikusui attack off Okinawa involves 165 kamikazes. They sink a destroyer-transport and two smaller ships and damage a destroyer and a destroyer-transport on May 25.
- May 24–25 – British Pacific Fleet carrier aircraft make the final strikes of the war against the Sakishima Gunto, where all Japanese airfields have now been knocked out.
- May 24/25 (overnight) – Five Imperial Japanese Army Mitsubishi Ki-21 (Allied reporting name "Sally") bombers carrying Giretsu Kuteitai special airborne attack troops make a suicide raid on Kadena and Yontan airfields on Okinawa. Four are shot down, but the fifth belly lands on the principal runway at Yontan and disgorges ten giretsu troops, who destroy seven and damage 26 planes, blow up two fuel dumps, and kill two Americans and wound 18 before being killed. Japanese planes also bomb Ie Shima during the night.
- May 27 – During the Seventh War Bond Air Show at the Army Air Forces Fair at Wright Field in Dayton, Ohio, the pilot of a U.S. Army Air Forces Curtiss XP-55 Ascender fighter prototype (serial number 42-78847) attempts a slow roll during an exhibition flight after a low pass with a P-38 Lightning and P-51 Mustang on each wing but loses altitude and crashes, sending flaming debris into occupied civilian ground vehicles on a highway near the airfield. The crash kills the XP-55's pilot and between two and four civilians (sources differ) on the ground.
- May 27–29 – The eighth Japanese Kikusui attack off Okinawa involves 110 kamikazes. They sink a destroyer and damage two destroyers, three merchant ships, and an attack transport.
- May 31 – Middle East Airlines is founded. It will begin flight operations in January 1946.

=== June ===
- The United States possesses the world's first two atomic bombs.
- The Nicaraguan airline LANICA is founded. It will begin flight operations in 1946.
- June 2–3 – Carrier aircraft of Task Group 38.4 strike Kyushu.
- June 3–7 – The ninth Kikusui attack off Okinawa involves only 50 kamikazes and causes no significant damage.
- June 5 – A typhoon strikes U.S. Navy Task Force 38 southeast of Okinawa. The aircraft carriers USS Hornet, USS Bennington, USS Belleau Wood, USS San Jacinto, USS Windham Bay, and USS Salamaua are damaged and the task force loses 76 aircraft.
- June 6 – The Provisional International Civil Aviation Organization (PICAO) is established under the Convention on International Civil Aviation, intended to operate until 26 countries ratify the convention and thereby permit the establishment of a permanent organization.
- June 8 – Carrier aircraft of Task Group 38.4 strike Kyushu. Aircraft bombing Kanoya Air Field employ variable time fuzes on 260-pound (120 kg) bombs for the first time as a means of attacking revetted Japanese aircraft.
- June 17 – 457 B-29 Superfortresses drop 3,195 tons (2,898,485 kg) of bombs on Ōmuta and other cities in Japan.
- June 19
  - 481 B-29s drop 3,335 tons (3,025,492 kg) of bombs on Toyohashi and other cities in Japan.
  - B-24 Liberators of the U.S. Army Air Forces' 404th Bombardment Squadron make the longest bombing mission flown in the North Pacific Area during World War II, flying a 2,700-mile (4,348-km) round trip from Shemya to attack the Japanese base at Kruppu in the Kurile Islands. The B-24s are in the air for 15 1/2 hours.
- June 21–22 – The tenth and final Japanese Kikusui attack off Okinawa involves only 45 kamikazes. They sink a medium landing ship and the hulk of a decommissioned destroyer and damage two seaplane tenders and two smaller ships.
- June 22 – 412 B-29s drop 2,290 tons (2,077,474 kg) of bombs on Kure, Wakayama, and other cities in Japan.
- June 26 – 468 B-29s drop 3,058 tons (2,774,199 kg) of bombs on Osaka and other cities in Japan.
- June 28 – 485 B-29s drop 3,519 tons (3,192,416 kg) of bombs on Okayama, Sasebo, and Moji, Japan.
- June 30 – United States Secretary of War Henry L. Stimson approves a U.S. Army Air Forces request for the Douglas Aircraft Company to develop an airplane capable of reaching a sustained speed of Mach 2 at an altitude of 30,000 feet (9,100 meters), flying for at least 30 minutes, and taking off and landing under its own power.

=== July ===
- Japan produces 1,131 aircraft, its lowest monthly total since February 1943.
- A U.S. Army Air Forces air intelligence report finds that Army Air Forces aircraft had destroyed 30,152 German aircraft during the war in Europe in exchange for 18,418 Army Air Forces aircraft destroyed.
- Several manufacturers have built a combined total of 8,751 Airspeed Oxfords.
- Avro Canada is formed as a part of the Hawker Siddeley Group and takes over the former Victory Aircraft factory at Malton, Ontario, Canada.
- Aeropostal Alas de Venezuela (LAV) makes its first international flights, inaugurating service between Venezuela and Boa Vista, Brazil.
- July 1–3 – The U.S. Navy escort carriers USS Suwannee, USS Chenango, and USS Gilbert Islands with Marine Air Group 2 embarked support Australian Army amphibious landings at Balikpapan, Borneo.
- July 2
  - 532 B-29 Superfortresses drop 3,709 tons (3,365 metric tons/tonnes) of bombs on Kure, Kumamoto, and other cities in Japan.
  - The Okinawa campaign is officially declared over with the complete defeat of Japanese forces there. During the campaign, the Allies have lost 32 ships and naval craft sunk and 368 damaged and over 4,900 naval personnel killed and 4,824 wounded. Most of the ships sunk were victims of kamikazes. The Allies also have lost 763 aircraft during the campaign.
  - The shareholders of Aeroput, Yugoslavia's first civilian airline and the flag carrier of the Kingdom of Yugoslavia from 1927 to April 1941, when the German invasion of Yugoslavia knocked it out of business and destroyed most of its property, meet to restart the airline and its operation. However, JAT Jugoslovenski Aerotransport will replace Aeroput in April 1947, and Aeroput will be dissolved in December 1948 without having resumed flight operations.
- July 4 – 483 B-29s drop 3,752 tons (3,404 metric tons/tonnes) of bombs on Kōchi and other cities in Japan.
- July 5 – The U.S. Civil Aeronautics Board approves the acquisition of American Export Airlines (AEA) by American Airlines. AEA retains a separate identity as a subsidiary of American, but its acquisition allows American to compete with Pan American Airways in transatlantic service.
- July 5–11 – Aircraft from the British aircraft carriers HMS Ameer and HMS Emperor strike Japanese airfields and shipping at Car Nicobar.
- July 7 – 568 B-29s drop 4,227 tons (3,835 metric tons/tonnes) of bombs on Chiba and other cities in Japan.
- July 10 – Aircraft from the 20 aircraft carriers of U.S. Navy Task Force 38 strike Tokyo and vicinity. In addition, 536 B-29s drop 3,872 tons (3,513 metric tons) of bombs on Sendai and other cities in Japan.
- July 11 – Iceland Airways – the future Icelandair – makes its first commercial flight over the Atlantic Ocean, using a Consolidated PBY Catalina to fly four passengers and a crew of four from Reykjavík, Iceland, to Largs, Scotland.
- July 12 – An Eastern Air Lines Flight 45, a Douglas DC-3-201C en route from Boston Massachusetts, to Miami, Florida, with stops in Washington, D.C. and Columbia, South Carolina, collides with a United States Army Air Forces A-26 Invader bomber 3,100 feet (940 m) above Syracuse, South Carolina, (about 20 miles (32 km) from Florence, South Carolina. The commercial pilot, G. D. Davis, lands his airliner in a cornfield. One passenger, an infant, is killed aboard the airliner. The A-26's tail is sheared off; two aboard the bomber die and one is able to parachute safely.
- July 13 – 517 B-29s drop 3,640 tons (3,302 metric tons/tonnes) of bombs on Utsunomiya and other cities in Japan.
- July 14 – Task Force 38 carrier aircraft fly 1,391 sorties against targets in northern Honshu and Hokkaido, Japan, without any Japanese air opposition. They destroy 25 Japanese aircraft, sink three destroyers, eight naval auxiliaries, and 20 merchant ships, and damage a destroyer, three escort craft, and 21 merchant ships.
- July 15
  - In a second day of air strikes on northern Honshu and Hokkaido, Task Force 38 aircraft completely disrupt the Aomori-Hakodate train ferry system and sink numerous colliers, reducing the Japanese coal-carrying capacity by 50 percent.
  - The Balkan Air Force is disbanded.
- July 16 – 471 B-29s drop 3,678 tons (3,337 metric tons/tonnes) of bombs on Numazu and other cities in Japan.
- July 18 – Task Force 38 carrier aircraft conduct heavy strikes against targets along the shore of Tokyo Bay, concentrating on the Yokosuka Naval Arsenal, where they damage the battleship Nagato and sink a submarine, a destroyer, and three smaller vessels.
- July 19
  - U.S. Army Air Forces B-29 Superfortresses strike Hitachi, Japan.
  - A Royal Air Force Liberator C.VII transport aircraft bound for Manus Island fails to gain altitude after taking off from Sydney, Australia, strikes trees, and crashes at Brighton-Le-Sands, New South Wales. The aircraft explodes on impact, killing all 12 passengers and crew on board. The victims are armed forces personnel from the United Kingdom, Australia, and New Zealand.
- July 20 – 473 B-29s drop 3,255 tons (2,953 metric tons/tonnes) of bombs on Fukui and other cities in Japan.
- July 23 – The Japanese submarines I-400 and I-401 depart Japan to launch a surprise air strike on American ships at Ulithi Atoll using six submarine-launched Aichi M6A floatplanes painted in American markings. The two submarines will abort the mission and jettison the aircraft on 16 August when they learn of Japan's surrender.
- July 24
  - Task Force 38 carrier aircraft fly 1,747 sorties against no air opposition, striking targets in the Inland Sea of Japan in one of the heaviest days of carrier air strikes of World War II. At Kure, Japan, they sink the battleship Hyūga, the heavy cruisers Tone and Aoba, and the obsolete battleship Settsu and armored cruiser Iwate, heavily damage the aircraft carrier Amagi, and damage the aircraft carrier Kaiyō.
  - 570 U.S. Army Air Forces B-29s drop 3,445 tons (3,125 metric tons/tonnes) of bombs on Osaka and Nagoya, Japan.
- July 24–26 – Aircraft from carriers of the British 21st Aircraft Carrier Squadron strike Japanese airfields and shipping in northern Malaya.
- July 28
  - Task Force 38 carrier aircraft again carry out heavy airstrikes against targets in the Inland Sea without meeting aerial opposition. They sink the aircraft carrier Amagi, the battleships Haruna and Ise, and the obsolete armored cruiser Izumo and damage the aircraft carriers Katsuragi and Kaiyō. In addition, 548 U.S. Army Air Forces B-29s drop 4,427 tons (4,016 metric tons/tonnes) of bombs on Tsu and other cities in Japan.
  - A U.S. Army Air Forces B-25 Mitchell bomber crashes into the 79th floor of the Empire State Building in New York City, killing 14 people.
- July 29 – U.S. Army Air Forces B-25 Mitchells and U.S. Navy aircraft from the aircraft carrier USS Ticonderoga further damage the Japanese aircraft carrier Kaiyo in Beppu Bay.
- July 29–30
  - Japanese kamikazes make their last attacks on ships off Okinawa, damaging two U.S. destroyers.
  - Carrier aircraft of Task Force 38 strike the Maizuru Naval Arsenal and the north coast of Honshu, Japan.
- July 30 – Swissair resumes commercial flight operations. It had suspended them for the duration of World War II in August 1944.
- July 31 – Since beginning the strategic bombing campaign against Japan in June 1944, B-29s of the U.S. Army's Twentieth Air Force have destroyed 67 Japanese cities, leaving only four major cities – Kokura, Kyoto, Hiroshima, and Nagasaki, – undamaged. During July 1945, the B-29s have carried an average bombload of 7.4 tons (6.7 metric tons) per plane – an increase of 4.8 tons (4.4 metric tons) since November 1944 – dropped more than 75 percent of their bombs by radar, and suffered a loss rate of only 0.4 percent of aircraft raiding Japan (down from 5.7 percent in January 1945).

=== August ===
- After spending the World War II years based at Helensburgh, Scotland, the Royal Air Force's Marine Aircraft Experimental Establishment moves back to its prewar base at Felixstowe, Suffolk.
- August 1 – Essair Lines becomes the first airline to operate as a "feeder" or "local service" airline, a new category of airline established experimentally by the U.S. Civil Aeronautics Board to provide commercial air service to smaller communities. Under a temporary certificate to operate in this way, Essair flies routes within Texas.
- August 2
  - 855 B-29 Superfortresses drop 6,600 tons (5,987 metric tons) of bombs on Toyama, Tachikawa, and other cities in Japan. The attack on Toyama is an incendiary raid that destroys almost the entire city.
  - A U.S. Navy PV-1 Ventura patrol plane discovers survivors of the heavy cruiser USS Indianapolis, the first indication that Indianapolis is even missing, 84 hours after she had been sunk by the Japanese submarine I-58 in the Philippine Sea. A large air-sea rescue operation lasts until August 8, but saves only 316 of her crew of 1,199.
- August 6
  - The B-29 Superfortress Enola Gay drops the atomic bomb "Little Boy", the first nuclear weapon used in warfare, over the Japanese city of Hiroshima. In addition, 573 B-29s drop 4,122 tons (3,739 metric tons) of bombs on Saga and other cities in Japan.
  - The top-scoring American ace of World War II, U.S. Army Air Forces Major Richard I. Bong (40 victories), is killed in the crash of a P-80 Shooting Star fighter at Lockheed Air Terminal in Burbank, California.
- August 7
  - 131 B-29s drop 830 tons (7,529 metric tons) of bombs on the Toyokawa Naval Arsenal in Japan.
  - The U.S. Army Air Forces redesignate the United States Strategic Air Forces as the United States Air Forces in Europe.
- August 8 – 245 B-29s drop 1,296 tons (1,176 metric tons) of bombs on Yawata, Japan.
- August 9
  - The B-29 Superfortress Bockscar drops the plutonium-239 atomic bomb Fat Man on Nagasaki, Japan.
  - Carrier aircraft of Task Force 38 conduct devastating strikes against Japanese airfields in northern Honshu where the Japanese had been marshalling aircraft for a planned major suicide strike on B-29 bases in the Mariana Islands. The Americans claim 251 Japanese aircraft destroyed and 141 damaged.
- August 10
  - Task Force 38 aircraft again strike northern Honshu heavily, striking two previously undetected Japanese airfields.
  - After suffering heavy damage during the airstrikes of July 24, 28, and 29, the Japanese aircraft carrier Kaiyō is abandoned in Beppu Bay when she lists far enough for the port side of her flight deck to be underwater. She later will be scrapped in place.
- August 13 – Carrier aircraft of Task Force 38 strike the Tokyo area, claiming 272 Japanese aircraft destroyed and 149 damaged.
- August 13–14 (overnight) – Seven B-29 Superfortresses drop five million leaflets over Tokyo, providing the Japanese population for the first time with the news that Japan had accepted the Potsdam Declaration and was negotiating for peace.
- August 15
  - Task Force 38 launches its last strike of the war, targeting Tokyo. A second strike jettisons its bombs in the sea when it receives word of the ceasefire agreement with Japan. In the final large dogfight of World War II, 15 to 20 Japanese planes jump six F6F Hellcats of U.S. Navy Fighter Squadron 88 (VF-88) from USS Yorktown; the Hellcats shoot down nine Japanese plans in exchange for four of their own.
  - An Imperial Japanese Navy Nakajima C6N Saiun ("Painted Cloud") reconnaissance plane (Allied reporting name "Myrt") is shot down by a Lieutenant Commander Reidy five minutes before the armistice with Japan takes effect. It is the last confirmed air-to-air victory of World War II.
  - Seven Imperial Japanese Navy aircraft make the last kamikaze attack of World War II.
- August 15 (August 14 east of the International Date Line) – VJ Day; Japan surrenders, ending the war in the Pacific theater and bringing World War II to an end.
- August 18
  - The last aerial combat of World War II takes place when two U.S. Army Air Forces 386th Bombardment Group B-32 Dominator bombers on a photographic mission come under fire from Japanese forces over Tokyo despite the official cessation of hostilities three days earlier. After encountering ineffective Japanese antiaircraft fire, the bombers face an attack by Japanese fighters – Imperial Japanese Navy Mitsubishi A6M5 Zeroes (Allied reporting name "Zeke") and what the U.S. airmen report as Imperial Japanese Army Nakajima Ki-44s (Allied reporting name "Tojo"), although the latter probably are Japanese Navy Kawanishi N1K-Js (Allied reporting name "George"). The Japanese ace Saburō Sakai pilots one of the fighters, but later claims not to have fired his guns. Gunners aboard the B-32s claim two Japanese fighters shot down and one probable; aboard one of the B-32s, one man is wounded and another killed, the last U.S. Army Air Forces casualties of World War II.
  - Indian nationalist revolutionary Subhas Chandra Bose reportedly dies in the crash of a Japanese aircraft at Matsuyama aerodrome (now Taipei Songshan Airport) at Taipei on Formosa (now Taiwan), although the report of his death in the crash has since been disputed.
- August 19 – Two Mitsubishi G4M (Allied reporting name "Betty") bombers carry Japan's surrender delegation to Ie Shima.
- August 25 – A U.S. Army Air Forces P-38 Lightning fighter piloted by Colonel Clay Tice becomes the first American aircraft to land in Japan following the armistice of August 15.

=== September ===
- The first U.S. Navy aircraft carriers take part in Operation Magic Carpet, which returns millions of American military personnel to the United States after World War II. Sixty-three U.S. aircraft carriers will take part before the operation concludes in September 1946.
- September 2 – At the conclusion of the surrender ceremony aboard the U.S. Navy battleship USS Missouri in Tokyo Bay, in which Japan formally surrenders to the Allies to end World War II, 450 Allied carrier planes and several hundred U.S. Army Air Forces aircraft perform a victory fly-by over the ships in the bay.
- September 6 – A captured German Focke-Achgelis Fa 223 V14, makes the first helicopter crossing of the English Channel when it flies from Cherbourg Naval Base, France, to RAF Beaulieu in the New Forest, Hampshire, England.
- September 8 – The first British troops to arrive in the Netherlands East Indies to accept the surrender of Japanese forces there arrive by air, parachuting into Kemayoran Airport in Batavia on Java.
- September 10 – Five escort carriers of the British East Indies Fleet's 21st Aircraft Carrier Squadron anchor off Singapore to support Operation Zipper, the British reoccupation of Malaya.
- September 12 – The first flight of the U.S. Army Air Forces′ Northrop XP-79B turbojet flying wing fighter prototype ends in tragedy when the aircraft goes out of control during a slow roll and crashes 15 minutes into the flight, spinning vertically into the ground. Test pilot Harry Crosby is struck by the plane and falls to his death while attempting to bail out. The XP-79 project is cancelled soon afterward.
- September 15 – A flypast of 300 aircraft takes place over London to celebrate Battle of Britain Day on the fifth anniversary of the decisive day of combat in the Battle of Britain.
- September 20 – An experimental Gloster Meteor with Rolls-Royce Trent engines makes the first turboprop-powered flight.
- September 28 – The headquarters of the United States Air Forces in Europe moves to Wiesbaden, Germany.

=== October ===
- The Royal Navy cancels five of its eight planned Centaur-class aircraft carriers.
- October 1 – The first annual general meeting of the International Air Transport Association begins in Montreal, Quebec, Canada.
- October 2 – A U.S. Navy PBM Mariner flying boat carrying Rear Admiral William Sample and eight others disappears near Wakayama, Japan. The wreckage and their bodies will not be discovered until November 19, 1948.
- October 5 – National Airlines Flight 16, a Lockheed 18–50 Lodestar, overshoots the runway and crashes into a lake at Lakeland, Florida. Two passengers drown, and several of the 13 survivors are injured.
- October 16 – The U.S. Joint Chiefs of Staff examine an intelligence report which states that the Soviet Air Force has 35,000 combat aircraft organized into 350 fighter regiments and 230 bomber regiments, all dedicated either to ground support of the Soviet Army or home air defense, and that after post-World War II demobilization was complete 410 air regiments would remain. The report states that the Soviet Union has no strategic air force and assesses that it will not field its first atomic bomb until at least 1950.
- October 23 – The U.S. Joint Intelligence Staff assesses that the Soviet Union will require five to 10 years to field an atomic bomb and create a strategic air force.
- October 24 – Using a Douglas C-54 Skymaster, American Export Airlines (AEA) begins the first scheduled commercial transatlantic airline service by a landplane, operating between New York City and London. Since the new London-Heathrow airport is not yet available for commercial operations, AEA uses Bournemouth-Hurn Airport.
- October 27 – British aircraft drop leaflets over Surabaya on Java in the Netherlands East Indies demanding that Indonesian Republican forces surrender to British forces.

=== November ===
- The Royal Navy cancels all three of its planned Malta-class aircraft carriers.
- The report of the United States Strategic Bombing Survey on the results of strategic bombing in World War II is made public. Its critics view its findings as debatable or capable of supporting any position on the effectiveness of air power.
- American Export Airlines is renamed American Overseas Airlines.
- November 3
  - The U.S. Joint Intelligence Committee reports on the Soviet Union's vulnerability to atomic attack, finding that the United States does not have enough atomic weapons to destroy the Soviet transportation system, power grid, or metals industry, or to be useful on conventional battlefields. It recommends that in the event of war the U.S. Army Air Forces make atomic strikes against 20 Soviet cities in an attempt to destroy research and development centers, administrative centers, and munitions and aircraft factories, but notes that the small yields of contemporary bombs means that even attacks that successfully bomb cities may be too inaccurate to destroy the intended targets.
  - The Pan American World Airways Boeing 314 flying boat Honolulu Clipper, operating on an Operation Magic Carpet flight carrying 26 American servicemen home to the United States after World War II, makes a forced landing in the Pacific Ocean 650 miles east of Oahu in the Hawaiian Islands without injury to passengers or crew, all of whom are rescued by a tanker the following morning. U.S. Navy attempts to repair the aircraft fail, as do Navy efforts to tow it, and the Navy eventually sinks Honolulu Clipper by gunfire on November 14.
- November 6 – After its piston engine fails, a mixed-propulsion Ryan FR-1 Fireball fighter flown by U.S. Marine Corps pilot J. C. West makes the first landing under jet power on an aircraft carrier, landing aboard USS Wake Island.
- November 7 – British Royal Air Force Group Captain Hugh J. Wilson sets a new official airspeed record (the first for a jet aircraft) of 606 mph (975 km/h) in a Gloster Meteor, flying from RAF Manston. Unofficial German speed records by the rocket-powered Messerschmitt Me 163 during the war had already exceeded 625 mph (1,006 km/h) on October 2, 1941, and 1,130 km/h (700 mph) on July 6, 1944.
- November 9 – After curtailing service during World War II, flying only a single route between Dublin and England – to either Liverpool or Barton Aerodrome in Manchester depending on the security situation at the time – Aer Lingus restores its full flight schedule post-war. It he firinaugurates the return of its full flight schedule with a flight to London.
- November 10
  - On Java in the Netherlands East Indies, British airstrikes support the opening of an offensive by British and British Indian troops to take Surabaya from Indonesian nationalist forces during the Battle of Surabaya, part of the Indonesian National Revolution.
  - South African Airways opens its first route to Europe when one of its Avro York airliners lands at Bournemouth, England, after a flight from Palmietfontein near Johannesburg, South Africa.
- November 16 – Pan American World Airways resumes commercial seaplane service between California and Hawaii, using Boeing Clipper aircraft it has leased to the U.S. Navy during World War II.
- November 20 – A United States Army Air Forces Boeing B-29 Superfortress flies from Guam to Washington, D.C., setting a new world unrefueled nonstop flight distance record of 12,739.6 kilometers (7,916.0 miles).

=== December ===
- December 4 – A de Havilland Sea Vampire Mk 5 becomes the first jet aircraft to intentionally take off and land from an aircraft carrier, HMS Ocean.
- December 5 – Flight 19, a formation of five U.S. Navy TBM Avengers with a total of 14 men aboard, vanishes without trace over the Atlantic Ocean east of Florida. A U.S. Navy PBM-5 Mariner flying boat sent to search for the Avengers also disappears with the loss of all 13 men aboard, apparently the victim of an accidental mid-air explosion.
- December 8 – The U.S. Joint Chiefs of Staff release a report on the effect of atomic weapons on warfare. It finds that there is no effective defense against atomic weapons and that the appearance of such weapons in the hands of an adversary would seriously degrade American national security. It also notes that the Soviet Union has better air defenses than does the United States, leaving the United States more vulnerable to atomic attack. It finds that in a war with the Soviet Union, the United States will have to seize forward bases from which to launch bombers for nuclear strikes, and that the United States will have to strike first to preempt a Soviet nuclear attack if the Soviet Union develops an atomic arsenal and the United States detects preparations for such an attack.
- December 12 – William Dolley Tipton, a U.S. World War I fighter pilot and possible ace who also served in World War II, dies in the crash near Adena, Ohio, of a P-47N Thunderbolt he is piloting as he flies home to be released from active duty.
- December 21 – The first flight by an American turboprop-powered aircraft takes place, when the Consolidated Vultee XP-81, previously flown with a piston engine, flies under turboprop power for the first time.

== First flights ==
- Aeronca 11 Chief
- Auster A.O.P.6
- Prototype of the Cessna 190 and 195 Businessliner
- Cierva W.9
- Ilyushin Il-16
- Thorp T-211
- Yokosuka D3Y Myojo ("Venus")

=== January ===
- January 26
  - McDonnell XFD-1, prototype of the FD Phantom, later redesignated FH Phantom, the first jet aircraft to operate from a U.S. Navy aircraft carrier.
  - Miles M.57 Aerovan

=== February ===
- February 1 – Kawasaki Ki-100
- February 2 – Horten H.IX V2, first powered prototype of the Horten Ho 229
- February 6 – Morane-Saulnier MS.470
- February 7 or 11 – Consolidated-Vultee XP-81 (with piston engine)
- February 21 – Hawker Sea Fury prototype SR661
- February 23 – Bachem Ba 349 Natter (first vertical launch under rocket power)
- February 25 – Bell XP-83
- February 26 – SNCASO SO.30N
- February 27 – Curtiss XF15C
- February 27 – Bréguet 500 Colmar

=== March ===
- Nakajima Ki-115 Tsurugi ("Sabre")
- March 1 – Bachem Ba 349 (first crewed vertical launch under rocket power)
- March 2 – Hispano Aviación HA-1109-J1L
- March 3 – Mikoyan-Gurevich I-250 (N), first Soviet thermojet
- March 7 – Piasecki HRP Rescuer
- March 15 – SNCASO SO.3050
- March 18 – Douglas XB2D-1, prototype of the AD Skyraider

=== April ===
- Kokusai Ki-105 Ohtori ("Phoenix")
- Nakajima Ki-87
- Rikugun Ki-93
- April 15 – North American XP-82, prototype of the P-82 Twin Mustang
- April 19 – de Havilland Sea Hornet prototype PX212
- April 27 – Pilatus P-2

=== May ===
- May 8 – Yokosuka R2Y1 Keiun ("Beautiful Cloud"), piston-engined prototype of the R2Y2, projected as the first Japanese jet attack aircraft
- May 17 – Lockheed XP2V-1 Bu48237, prototype of the P2V Neptune (later P-2 Neptune)

=== June ===
- June 3 – Miles M.64 L.R.5
- June 10 – Ilyushin IL-16
- June 14 – Avro Tudor 1 G-AGPF, the first British pressurised civilian aircraft
- June 22 – Vickers Viking prototype G-AGOK
- June 25 – Kokusai Ta-Go
- June 28 – Cessna 140

=== July ===
- July 3 – Northrop F-15 Reporter
- July 5 – Fairey Spearfish prototype RA356
- July 7
  - Mitsubishi J8M Shusui ("Sword Stroke"), first Japanese rocket-powered aircraft
  - Arsenal VB 10
- July 17 – Burnelli CBY-3 Loadmaster
- July 23 – Max Holste MH.52

=== August ===
- August 3 – Kyushu J7W Shinden ("Magnificent Lightning")
- August 7 – Nakajima Kikka ("Orange Blossom"), first Japanese jet
- August 13 – Mikoyan-Gurevich MiG-8 Utka ("Duck", from its canard design, as in the French word canard for "duck")
- August 15 – Ilyushin Il-12 (NATO reporting name "Coach")

=== September ===
- September 1 – Morane-Saulnier MS.560
- September 5 – Douglas C-74 Globemaster
- September 12 – Northrop XP-79B Flying Ram
- September 25 – de Havilland Dove

=== October ===
- October 4 — SNCASE SE-2100
- October 6 — SCAN 20
- October 26 – Miles M.65 Gemini
- October 26 — SNCASE SE-2300
- October 27 – Bristol Buckmaster
- October 28 – LWD Szpak

=== November ===
- November 10 – Yakovlev Yak-11
- November 13 – Bellanca 14–13 Cruisair Senior
- November 15 – PZL S-1
- November 20 – Saab 91 Safir

=== December ===
- December 2
  - Bristol 170 G-AGPV
  - Handley Page Hermes G-AGSS
- December 8 – Bell 47 prototype NC1H
- December 15 - Nord Norécrin
- December 19
  - Grumman XTB3F-1, prototype of the AF Guardian
  - Morane-Saulnier MS.570
- December 21 Consolidated Vultee XP-81 (with turboprop engine, first American turboprop-powered flight)
- December 22 – Beechcraft Bonanza
- December 28 – Edo XOSE-1, prototype of the Edo OSE

== Entered service ==
=== January ===
- Ilyushin Il-10 in the Soviet Air Force
- Two YP-80A jet fighters were deployed to Lesina Airfield in southeastern Italy, with the 1st Fighter Group

=== March ===
- Ryan FR Fireball with U.S. Navy Fighter Squadron 66 (VF-66)
- March 9 – Kawasaki Ki-100 fighter and interceptor with the 111th Sentai of the Imperial Japanese Army Air Service.
- March 21 – Yokosuka MXY7 Ohka ("Cherry Blossom"), Allied reporting name "Baka") rocket-propelled suicide aircraft with the Imperial Japanese Navy's 721st Naval Air Corps

=== May ===
- May 21
  - Avro Lincoln with the Royal Air Force's Bomber Development Unit
  - Grumman F8F Bearcat with U.S. Navy Fighter Squadron 19 (VF-19)

=== August ===
- Avro Lincoln with No. 57 Squadron RAF

=== November ===
- Aeronca Champion
- Hawker Tempest II with No. 54 Squadron RAF

== Retirements ==
- Avro 626
- Martin Maryland

=== May ===
- May 25 – Handley Page H.P.54 Harrow
