= MS 570 =

MS 570 may refer to:

- Mississippi Highway 570
- Morane-Saulnier MS.570, an aircraft produced in the 1940s
