= Nakajima Ki-115 Tsurugi =

Japanese suicide attack aircraft

Ki-115 Tsurugi
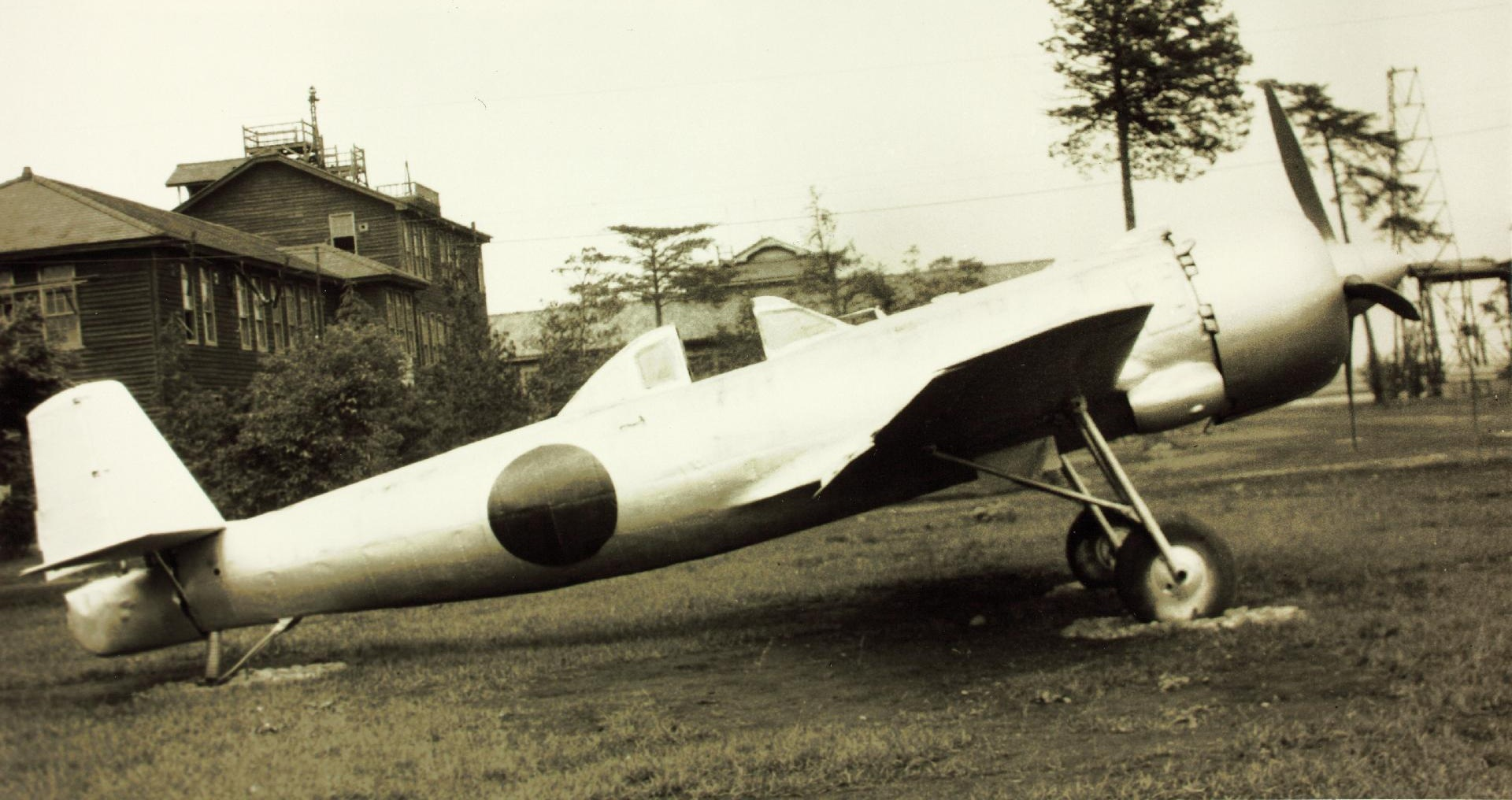

General information
- Type: Kamikaze aircraft
- Manufacturer: Nakajima Aircraft Company
- Status: Retired
- Primary users: Imperial Japanese Army Air Force Imperial Japanese Navy Air Service

History
- Manufactured: 104 or 105
- First flight: 5 March 1945
- Retired: 15 August 1945 (end of war)

The Nakajima Ki-115 Tsurugi (剣; "sabre") is a single-seat, dedicated kamikaze aircraft designed and produced by Japanese aviation manufacturer Nakajima Aircraft Company. The Imperial Japanese Navy (IJN) named the aircraft Tōka (藤花, "Wisteria Blossom").

The Ki-115 was developed during early 1945 under a crash programme at the behest of the Imperial Japanese Army (IJA) as part of Japan's late-stage World War II preparations to fight against the advancing Allied forces. Specifically, in the event of an anticipated invasion of the Japanese home islands, known as Operation Downfall, the Ki-115 was intended to perform kamikaze attacks targeting the vessels of this invasion force, as well as any Allied shipping encountered. To suit its role as a mass-produced suicide aircraft, it was designed to be cheap and easy to build, suitable for being produced by semiskilled workers. The Ki-115 also had a jettisonable undercarriage and was intentionally designed to be compatible with a wide range of radial engines.

The first prototype performed its maiden flight in March 1945; after some redesign work to correct its poor ground-handling characteristics, the Ki-115 was rapidly put into quantity production. While it had a top speed of 550 km/h (342 mph) and could carry a bomb weighing as much as 800 kg (1,760 lb), large enough to split a warship in two, as it was otherwise unarmed and heavily laden with its bomb, it would have made an easy target for enemy fighter aircraft. The Ki-115 was intended to be operated by both the Imperial Japanese Army Air Service (IJAAS) and the Imperial Japanese Navy Air Service (IJNAS), but the invasion it was intended to counter did not take place due to the Surrender of Japan; all surviving examples were promptly retired at the end of the conflict.

== Design and development ==
As the Pacific War progressed, it became increasingly apparent that Japan's wartime fortunes were declining and that the country would resort to increasingly desperate measures to attempt to stall the Allied advance and the ambition to hinder, if not prevent, a successful invasion of Japan itself. To this end, kamikaze tactics were embraced, sacrificing pilots and their aircraft in an attempt to damage their opponents. Initially, obsolete combat aircraft and trainers were assigned this role, but officials within the IJAAS recognised that not enough aircraft, even including obsolete ones, remained to fulfil the number of kamikaze attacks that the service intended to perform in the long term. Accordingly, IJAAS decided that purpose-built, sacrificial aircraft should be produced quickly in anticipation of an Allied invasion of Japan. While the IJN preferred exotic propulsion, such as rocket motors and jet engines, for its suicide aircraft, the IJA favoured more conventional propulsion.

Accordingly, on 20 January 1945, Nakajima Aircraft Company was instructed by the IJA to design a dedicated aircraft for performing suicide attacks; such an aircraft would have to be affordable and simple to manufacture, easy to both maintain and fly, and be able to carry a single bomb. It was also to possess a maximum speed no less than 340 kmph (211 mph) with the landing gear deployed, and that it should be jettisonable (as there was to be no landing) to attain no less than 515 kmph (320 mph); power was to be provided by an air-cooled radial engine.

The design team, which was augmented using personnel drawn from the Mitaka Research Institute and the Ota Manufacturing Co. Ltd, was headed by Aori Kunhiro. From the onset, the aircraft was planned to be suitable for production by semiskilled labourers, so would be relatively simple wherever practical to do so. Furthermore, it was designed to be constructed from "nonstrategic" materials, primarily wood and steel. The wings were entirely composed of metal, complete with a stressed-skin outer surface, the fuselage structure was steel, while the engine cowling was made of tin. The tail surfaces had a wooden structure and a fabric exterior. An open cockpit was positioned just above the trailing edge of the wing; a recessed crutch on the underside of the fuselage's centreline accommodated a single 800 kg (1,764 lb) bomb.

The cross-section of the fuselage was circular and not elliptical, common to many aircraft of this size and type, as such a fuselage was easier to manufacture. The Ki-115 featured an austere instrument panel, featuring flight instruments, rudder pedals, a joystick-type control column, and a place for a radio. Flight controls included both ailerons and elevators and (in production versions) flaps. The aircraft was fitted with a basic welded-steel tubular undercarriage. As a weight-reduction measure, the main legs of this undercarriage were jettisonable. The Ki-115 was designed to be able to use any engine that was in storage for ease of construction and supply and to absorb Japan's stocks of obsolete engines from the 1920s and 1930s. The initial aircraft (Ki-115a) were powered by 858-kilowatt (1,151 hp) Nakajima Ha-35 radial engines. Whether any other engine was ever actually fitted is unknown.

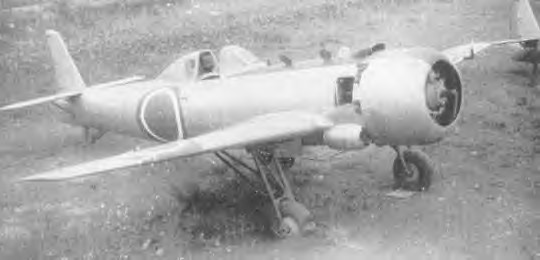
A Ki-115 shortly after the war: Note that the propellers had been removed to prevent flight.

On 5 March 1945, only two months after work commenced on its design, the prototype Ki-115 performed its maiden flight, and flight testing commenced that same day. Partially due to the rapid pace of development, its performance was underwhelming. In particular, testing revealed the aircraft's crude undercarriage to possess unmanageable ground-handling characteristics, leading to it being rapidly redesigned to incorporate shock absorbers. Following a period of testing, the first production aircraft was fitted with the revised undercarriage, as well as a pair of rocket units, which may have been used to assist with take-off, or may have been fired to boost the aircraft's terminal acceleration towards its intended target.

The Ki-115 demonstrated very poor take-off and landing performance and could not be safely flown by anyone other than experienced pilots; these factors heavily contributed to the multiple fatal crashes that occurred during testing and training. While the IJAAS launched a training programme involving the Ki-115 in late June 1945, it was quickly abandoned due to the rate of fatal accidents occurring; instead, a redesign of the aircraft was ordered. Around this time, the IJNAS approached Nakajima, having taken an interest in the type, and requested a variant of the Ki-115 be produced for their own operations. At one point, the Japanese High Command had plans to construct some 8,000 Ki-115s each month at workshops all across mainland Japan.

The surrender of Japan ended the conflict in August 1945, before any Ki-115s were ever delivered to combat units, thus no offensive missions were actually flown by the type.

== Variants ==
- Ki-115 Prototype: Single-seat suicide attack aircraft prototype version, tested during early 1945
- Ki-115 Tsurugi: Single-seat suicide attack aircraft, production version
- Ki-115b Tsurugi: Single-seat suicide attack aircraft proposed version using larger wooden wing, none built
- Ki-230: Single-seat suicide attack aircraft projected version, none built

== Surviving aircraft ==
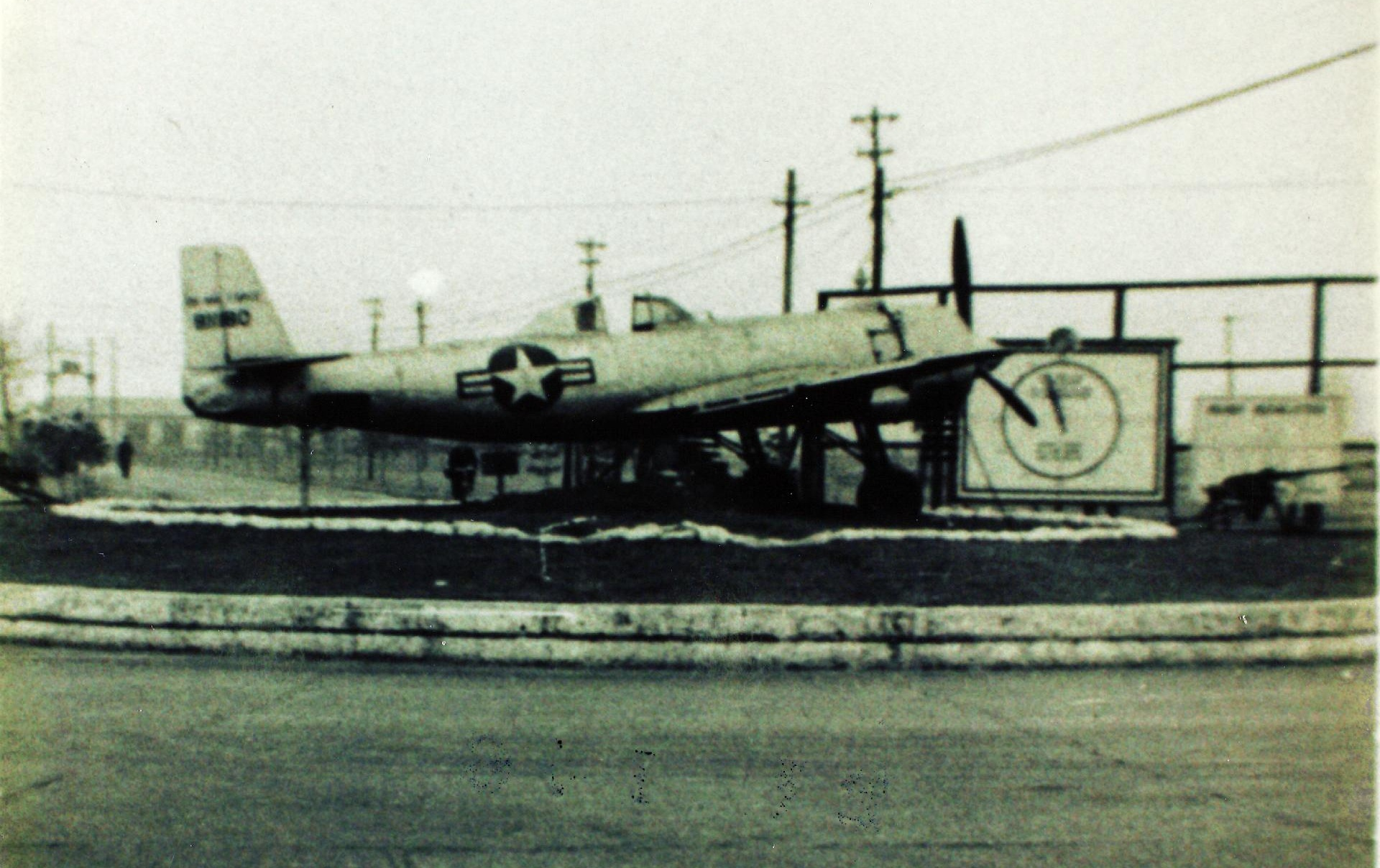
Ki-115 in USAF markings at Yokota Air Base

Of the 105 examples produced, two airframes are known to exist.

- Ki-115 1002 is on display at the Pima Air & Space Museum in Tucson, Arizona, and is on loan from the National Air and Space Museum.
- A second surviving airframe, formerly displayed at Yokota Air Base, is held by the National Museum of Nature and Science at its Tsukuba Research Facility in Tsukuba, Ibaraki, Japan. The aircraft is stored in a disassembled condition, with its engine removed, and is not normally accessible to the public. Military writer Kazunori Yoshikawa personally examined and photographed the aircraft for an article published in August 2023. A separate 2021 report also confirmed that the museum held the disassembled airframe in its Tsukuba storage facility.

== Specifications (Ki-115a) ==
Data from Japanese Aircraft of the Pacific War

General characteristics

- Crew: 1
- Length: 8.55 m (28 ft 1 in)
- Wingspan: 8.6 m (28 ft 3 in)
- Height: 3.3 m (10 ft 10 in)
- Wing area: 12.4 m^{2} (133 sq ft)
- Empty weight: 1,640 kg (3,616 lb)
- Gross weight: 2,580 kg (5,688 lb)
- Max takeoff weight: 2,880 kg (6,349 lb) with 800 kg (1,764 lb) bomb
- Powerplant: 1 × Nakajima Ha-35 Model 23 14-cylinder air-cooled radial piston engine, 840 kW (1,130 hp) for take-off

980 hp (730 kW) at 6,000 m (20,000 ft)

- Powerplant: 2 × solid rocket attack boosters (optional)
- Propellers: 3-bladed fixed-pitch metal propeller

Performance

- Maximum speed: 550 km/h (340 mph, 300 kn) at 2,800 m (9,200 ft) with undercarriage jettisoned
- Cruise speed: 300 km/h (190 mph, 160 kn)
- Range: 1,200 km (750 mi, 650 nmi)
- Wing loading: 208 kg/m^{2} (43 lb/sq ft)
- Power/mass: 0.322 kW/kg (0.196 hp/lb)

Armament

- Bombs: 1 × 250 kg (550 lb), 500 kg (1,100 lb), or 800 kg (1,800 lb) bomb

== See also ==
Aircraft of comparable role, configuration, and era

- Mitsubishi A6M7
- Nakajima Ki-43-IIIa
- Yokosuka MXY-7 Ohka
- Kokusai Ta-Go

Related lists

- List of aircraft of Japan during World War II
- List of military aircraft of Japan
