= Morane-Saulnier MS.560 =

MS.560

General information
- Type: Aerobatic monoplane
- National origin: France
- Manufacturer: Morane-Saulnier
- Number built: 3

History
- First flight: 1 September 1945
- Variant: Morane-Saulnier MS.570

The Morane-Saulnier MS.560 was a French civil aerobatic monoplane designed and built by Morane-Saulnier.

== Development ==
First flown in 1945 the MS.560 was a single-seat low-wing monoplane with a retractable landing gear. Powered by a 75 hp (56 kW) Train 6D-01 piston engine three variants followed all using different engines. In 1946 a two-seat touring variant was produced as the Morane-Saulnier MS.570.

== Variants ==
MS.560
Prototype powered by a 75 hp (56 kW) Train 6D-01 engine, one built.
MS.561
Variant powered by a 100 hp (75 kW) Mathis G4-Z engine, one built.
MS.562
Variant powered by a 100 hp (75 kW) Blackburn Cirrus Minor engine.
MS.563
Variant powered by a 100 hp (75 kW) Mathis G4-Z or Walter Minor 4-III engine.
MS.564
1949 variant powered by a Walter Minor 4-III engine, one built.

== Specifications (MS.560) ==
Data from , New French Personal Planes Mark Revival of Tricolor Industry

General characteristics

- Crew: 1
- Length: 7 m (23 ft 0 in)
- Wingspan: 9 m (29 ft 6 in)
- Height: 2 m (6 ft 7 in)
- Wing area: 11.79 m^{2} (126.9 sq ft)
- Empty weight: 347 kg (765 lb)
- Gross weight: 984 kg (2,170 lb)
- Powerplant: 1 × Train 6D-01 piston engine, 56 kW (75 hp)

Performance

- Maximum speed: 233 km/h (145 mph, 126 kn) at 500 m (1,640 ft)
- Cruise speed: 208 km/h (129 mph, 112 kn)
- Range: 1,000 km (620 mi, 540 nmi)
- Service ceiling: 7,000 m (22,960 ft)
