= Eastern Air Lines Flight 45 =

1945 mid-air collision

Coordinates: 34°13′49.64″N 79°57′56.68″W

Eastern Air Lines Flight 45 U.S. Army Air Force A-26 Invader
Accident
- Date: July 12, 1945
- Summary: Mid-air collision
- Site: Lamar, South Carolina, United States of America
- Total fatalities: 3
- Total injuries: 4
- Total survivors: 20

First aircraft
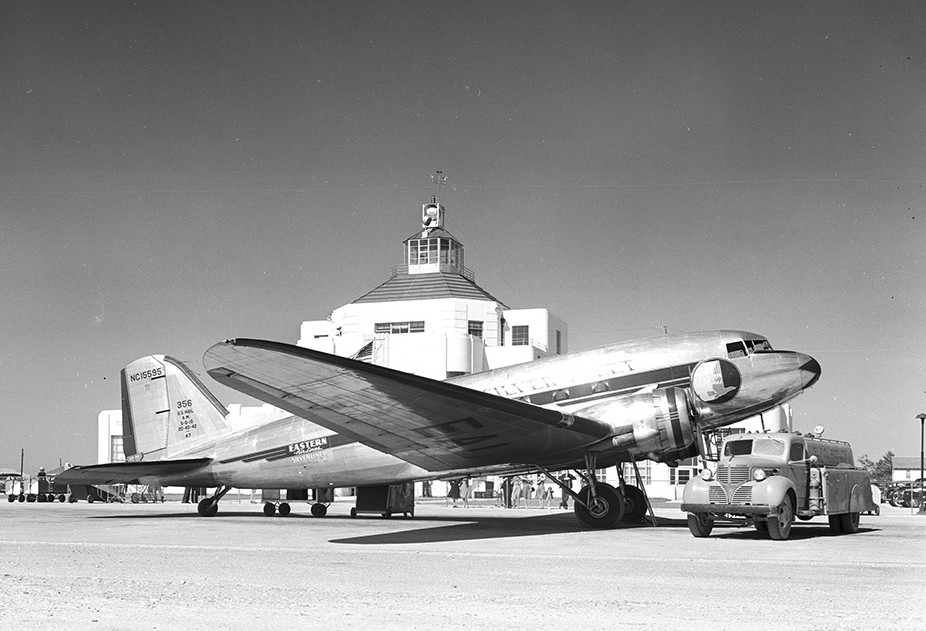
- An Eastern Air Lines DC-3 similar to the one involved in the crash
- Type: Douglas DC-3-201C
- Operator: Eastern Air Lines
- Registration: NC25647
- Occupants: 20
- Passengers: 17
- Crew: 3
- Fatalities: 1
- Survivors: 19

Second aircraft
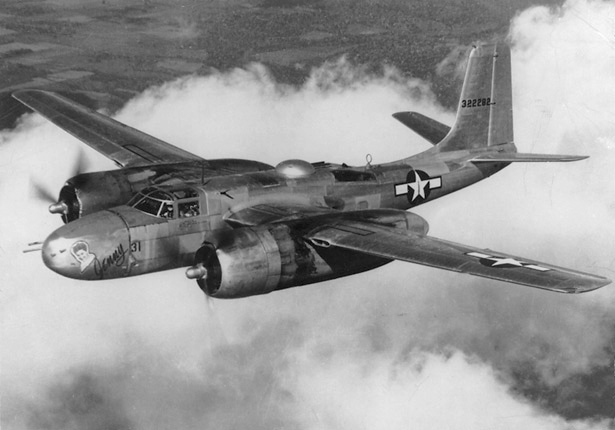
- A Douglas A-26 Invader similar to the one involved in the crash
- Type: Douglas A-26C-35-DT Invader
- Operator: U.S. Army Air Force
- Registration: 44-35553
- Occupants: 3
- Passengers: 0
- Crew: 3
- Fatalities: 2
- Survivors: 1

Eastern Air Lines Flight 45 was a domestic commercial airline flight that had a mid-air collision with a USAAF A-26 Invader bomber over northeastern South Carolina on July 12, 1945, forcing an emergency landing in a field by the airliner, and resulting in the crash of the bomber. One airline passenger and two bomber crewmen were killed.

On July 12, 1945, a US Army Air Forces A-26C-35-DT Invader, 44-35553, on a training flight out of Florence Army Air Field, had a mid-air collision with Eastern Air Lines Flight 45 from Washington, D.C. to Columbia, S.C., a DC-3-201C, NC25647, c/n 2235, at ~3100 feet, 11.9 miles WNW of Florence, South Carolina over the community of Lamar, South Carolina, at 1436 hrs. The A-26 vertical fin struck the port wing of the airliner, displacing the engine of the DC-3, which then cut into the fuselage. The A-26 tail sheared off and two of the crew parachuted but only one survived. The crew of the bomber who died were Cpl. Robert B. Clapp and Cpl. Raleigh B. Allbaugh Jr., both of Oklahoma City, Oklahoma. The surviving crew member's name was not released due to wartime censorship. The DC-3 pilot belly-landed in a cornfield after a 20-to-30-second descent. Only one passenger of the 20 total on board was killed: a two-year-old boy who suffered head injuries. He died while being transported to a hospital in Florence, South Carolina. His mother and two other persons were reported to be very seriously injured and were also taken to the Florence hospital.

According to "The State" newspaper on July 13, 1945 (page 1) the public relations office of the Florence Army Air Field issued the following statement:

An Eastern Air Lines DC-3, bound for Miami from Washington miraculously escaped destruction at 2:45 this afternoon when its senior pilot, G. D. Davis, of Miami, Fla., brought his crippled ship in for a safe landing after a mid-air collision with a twin-motored military craft.

There were three fatalities, two of them military personnel, but except for the masterful handling of his plane by Pilot Davis, it is almost certain that the 17 passengers and three crew members of the airliner would also have perished.

Until the next of kin have been notified, names of the casualties have been withheld.

The accident occurred approximately ten miles west of Darlington in the community of Syracuse. From eye-witness accounts, including testimony by Davis and N. L. Martindale, co-pilot of the airliner, the two planes collided when in flight at an altitude of approximately 3,000 feet with the airliner letting down preparatory to a landing in Columbia.

Mr. Davis said that neither he nor his co-pilot saw the bomber until just before the mid-air crash. Passengers of the plane also failed to see the ship. In the collision the left engine of the airliner was torn off and the fuselage was badly cut just aft of the pilot's cockpit.

Despite this damage to his plane, Davis maintained full flight control and brought his ship in for an emergency landing.

The bomber, according to witness accounts, plunged to the earth with only one of the three occupants parachuting to safety. Although not seriously injured, the one member of the bomber who parachuted was unable to be questioned this evening.

One occupant of the airliner died.
