= Kokusai Ta-Go =

WWII prototype Japanese kamikaze aircraft

Ta-Go

General information
- Type: Kamikaze aircraft
- National origin: Japan
- Manufacturer: Nippon Kokusai Koku Kogyo K.K
- Number built: 1

History
- First flight: 25 June 1945

The Kokusai Ta-Go was a prototype Japanese kamikaze aircraft of World War II. It was developed in 1945 as a small, easy to build aircraft which could be built in large numbers in small workshops, and was largely built of wood to reduce demands on strategic materials. A single example was completed, which first flew in June 1945, but the end of the war kept it from entering into mass production.

== Design and development ==
In 1945, Japanese plans to counter an expected Allied invasion of the Japanese home islands involved the mass use of suicide attacks against the invasion fleets, with thousands of kamikaze aircraft. Due to the American bombing of Japan and shortages of raw materials caused by the Allied naval blockade, Japan struggled to replenish its aircraft stocks needed for the defense against the Allied invasion. Consequently, there was a need to produce aircraft that were simple to build and used non-strategic materials. One proposed solution was the construction of versions of existing aircraft eliminating aluminium, with a wooden version of the Nakajima Ki-84 fighter built as the Tachikawa Ki-106, and the Yokosuka D3Y being a wooden version of the Aichi D3A dive bomber (with a single-seat kamikaze version, the D5Y, planned but unbuilt). The Imperial Japanese Army Air Service proposed the Nakajima Ki-115, an aircraft with a large proportion of its structure made of wood or steel and powered by surplus engines, to meet its needs for large numbers of kamikaze aircraft.

Captain Yoshiyuki Mizuyama, an officer at the Rikugun Kokugijutsu Kenkyujo (the Japanese Army Aerotechnical Research Institute), at Tachikawa, Tokyo, had the idea of building a simpler kamikaze aircraft, the Ta-Go (with Ta short for Take-Yari (bamboo spear)), using the bare minimum of strategic material, which could be built in small workshops. He approached the Tachikawa Aircraft Company to help design and build an aircraft based on his ideas, but the company rejected his approach as it had not been approved by the Koku Hombu (Japanese Army Air Headquarters) and the company had no spare capacity. Rather than abandoning his ideas, Mizuyama found a small shop in Tachikawa where he and his team completed the design of an aircraft to meet his plans, and started construction. His design was made of wood, with plywood and fabric covering, and was powered by a 450 hp (340 kW) Hitachi Ha-13 radial engine. It could carry a single 500 kg (1,100 lb) bomb. The prototype Ta-Go was almost complete when it was destroyed in a bombing raid in February 1945.

Mizuyama then went to Nippon Kokusai, who were an experienced builder of light aircraft and were less busy than the Tachikawa Aircraft Company. Nippon Kokusai agreed to take on Mizuyama's Ta-Go project. Mizuyama produced a new design for Kokusai, which was further simplified and significantly smaller, so that it could be powered by a single 80 kW (110 hp) Hitachi Ha-47 Hatsukaze 11 air-cooled inline engine. The new design was a low-wing monoplane of wooden construction. It had a slab-sided rectangular section fuselage, with a plywood skin over a wooden framework. The pilot sat in an open cockpit and was provided with basic instruments. The aircraft's wings could fold upwards to allow the aircraft to be stored in caves or similar small spaces. The aircraft's fuel tank and oil cooler were mounted on top of the engine cowling, attached by metal straps. The aircraft had a fixed conventional landing gear, made of steel tubing with rubber mainwheels and a tailskid. The undercarriage provided no shock absorbing other than that given by the tyres and tailskid. Armament consisted of a single 100 kg (220 lb) bomb, which was attached to the underside of the fuselage – as a suicide aircraft, no bomb release was provided for the pilot.

The prototype Kokusai Ta-Go made its first flight on 25 June 1945. The testing showed some handling issues, but after revision, a set of blueprints were drawn up for production. Meanwhile, the Japanese Army had given its approval to Mizuyama's original, larger, Ta-Go design, and Tachikawa began work on another prototype of the larger design. The short designation (Ki-number) Ki-128 was reported to have been allocated to one of the Ta-Go projects, but it is not clear whether this was meant for the smaller Kokusai design or the larger Tachikawa aircraft. The surrender of Japan on 15 August 1945 stopped construction of Tachikawa's Ta-Go prototype and ensured that production of the Kokusai Ta-Go could not start.

== Specifications (Kokusai Ta-Go) ==
Data from Letadla 39 – 45: Kokusai Ta-Go

General characteristics

- Crew: 1
- Length: 7.40 m (24 ft 3 in)
- Wingspan: 8.80 m (28 ft 10 in)
- Height: 2.80 m (9 ft 2 in)
- Wing area: 14.15 m^{2} (152.3 sq ft)
- Empty weight: 345 kg (761 lb)
- Gross weight: 585 kg (1,290 lb)
- Powerplant: 1 × Hitachi Ha-47 Hatsukaze 11 air-cooled inverted four-cylinder engine, 80 kW (110 hp)
- Propellers: 2-bladed fixed-pitch wooden propeller, 2.2 m (7.1 ft) diameter

Performance

- Maximum speed: 195 km/h (121 mph, 105 kn)
- Cruise speed: 168 km/h (104 mph, 91 kn)
- Range: 180 km (110 mi, 97 nmi)
- Service ceiling: 4,500 m (14,800 ft)

Armament

- Bombs: 1 × 100 kg (220 lb) bomb
