= Bell Airacobra I AH574 =

AH574
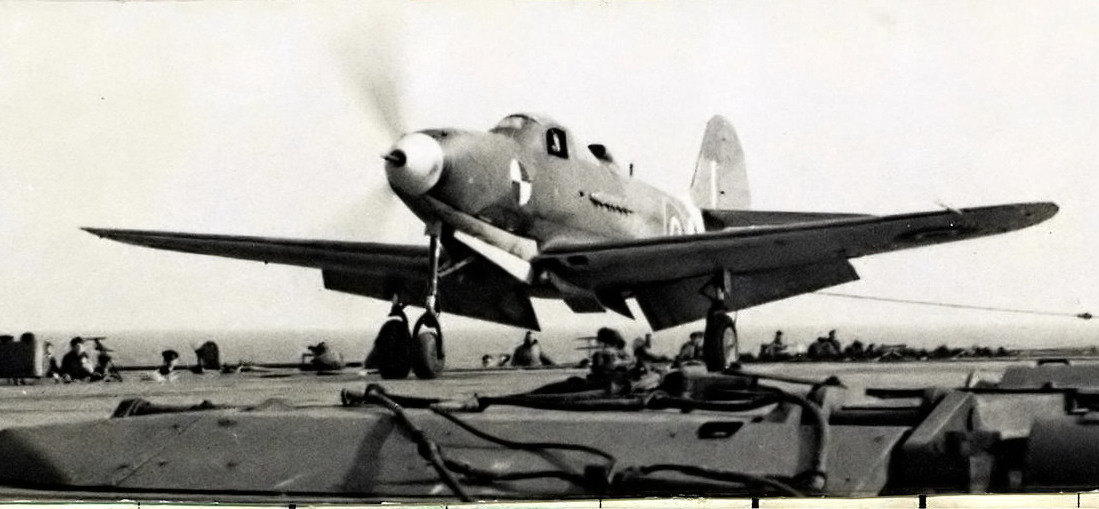
- AH574 onboard HMS Pretoria Castle

General information
- Type: Bell Airacobra I
- Serial: AH574

History
- Fate: Scrapped, 1946

AH574 was a Bell Airacobra I used by the Royal Navy for test work during and after the Second World War

== Initial history ==
AH574 was initially ordered in 1940 for the Royal Air Force (RAF) as part of the Airacobra I serial number block AH570–AH739 (No. 601 Squadron RAF). When the Airacobra type was rejected by the RAF, AH574 was transferred to the Royal Navy for test work.

== Test work ==
On 4 April 1945, AH574 became part of aviation history when test pilot Captain Eric "Winkle" Brown landed it on the flight deck of HMS Pretoria Castle—the first carrier landing made by an aircraft with retractable tricycle gear—due to a declared emergency during initial trials for landings on rubber decks planned for future carriers.

In his autobiography, Captain Brown described the circumstances thus:

I had already collected a few 'firsts' in aviation, and I rather wanted to be the first pilot to put a tricycle aircraft down on a flight deck. The Airacobra was not officially cleared for such a landing, but the boffins had told me privately that it would probably take the strain.
This was not on the official programme at all, but I hoped that I could persuade Captain Caspar John of the Pretoria Castle to turn a blind eye to what I had in mind. I wrote to him beforehand and asked him if he would be prepared to take me aboard in the event of sudden engine trouble. He at once saw what I was after, of course, and was good sport enough to go along with it. He suggested that it might be a good idea if my engine trouble occurred on my last approach.
Strangely enough it did. I began my approach, then, just for the record, called up the ship and complained that my engine was running rough. Would they accept me? Back came Captain John's instant 'affirmative'. I put the hook down, and caught the wire with no trouble at all.

The trouble started when the time came to take off, as the Airacobra had a long take-off run—which was one of the reasons behind the type's rejection by the RAF—and 'Winkle' only managed to get airborne because Pretoria Castle was steaming full speed ahead at the time.

== Fate ==
In March 1946, a visiting Bell test pilot oversaw laminar flow experiments being conducted with Bell P-63 Kingcobras.

Just for a laugh I asked him to test my old Bell Airacobra, which I had been using for so many hops around the country. He took off, did one very quick circuit, and came back ashed-faced. 'I have never,' he said, 'flown in an aeroplane in such an advanced state of decay. This machine should be scrapped forthwith.' So, on 28th March, I went up for a last aerobatic session in her, then bade a sentimental farewell. The last laugh was on me.

AH574 was duly scrapped shortly afterward, and Brown was later given a Fieseler Storch as a replacement.
