= Morane-Saulnier MS.570 =

1940s French light aircraft

MS.570
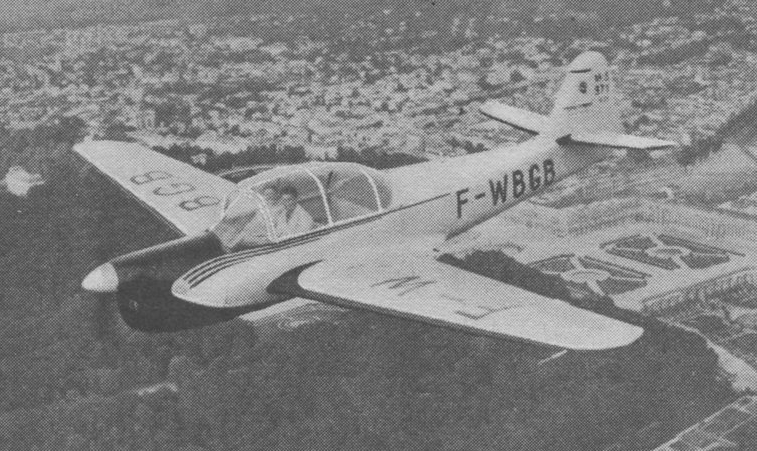
- MS.571

General information
- Type: Utility aircraft
- National origin: France
- Manufacturer: Morane-Saulnier
- Number built: 10

History
- First flight: 19 December 1945

The Morane-Saulnier MS.570 was a civil utility aircraft produced in small numbers in France in the late 1940s.

== Design and development ==
The MS.570 was a derivative of the MS.560 aerobatics aircraft with a revised fuselage design that added a second seat side-by-side with the pilot's and a more powerful engine.

Like its predecessor, the MS.570 was a low-wing cantilever monoplane with retractable tricycle undercarriage. Construction was of metal throughout, with the fuselage having a semi-monocoque structure. The cockpit was enclosed by an expansive bubble canopy that slid rearwards to provide access. The wings could be folded for storage.

While the MS.570 had only two seats, it was followed by MS.571 that added an extra seat to the rear of the cockpit (optionally, a small bench seat), and the dedicated four-seater MS.572.

== Variants ==
- MS.570 - two-seat version with Renault 4Pei engine (1 built)
- MS.571 - 3/4-seat version with Renault 4Pei engine (7 built)
- MS.572 - four-version with Potez 4D-01 engine (2 built)

== Specifications (MS.571 in three-seat configuration) ==
Data from "The Morane-Saulnier 571", p. 420

General characteristics

- Crew: One pilot
- Capacity: 2-3 passengers
- Length: 8.51 m (27 ft 11 in)
- Wingspan: 10.41 m (34 ft 2 in)
- Empty weight: 678 kg (1,490 lb)
- Gross weight: 1,054 kg (2,318 lb)
- Powerplant: 1 × Renault 4Pei , 104 kW (140 hp)

Performance

- Maximum speed: 258 km/h (161 mph, 140 kn)
- Range: 1,000 km (620 mi, 540 nmi)
- Service ceiling: 6,000 m (20,000 ft)
