= VF-1 (1945–1948) =

Fighter Squadron 1
- Active: 26 March 1945 – 20 November 1948
- Country: United States
- Branch: United States Navy
- Role: Fighter aircraft
- Part of: Inactive
- Nickname(s): Firebirds

Aircraft flown
- Fighter: F6F-5 Hellcat; FR-1 Fireball

Fighter Squadron 1 or VF-1 was an aviation unit of the United States Navy. Originally established as Fighter Squadron 41 (VF-41) on 26 March 1945, it was redesignated VF-1E on 15 November 1946, redesignated as VF-1 on 1 September 1948 and disestablished on 20 November 1948. It was the fourth US Navy squadron to be designated VF-1.

== Operational history ==
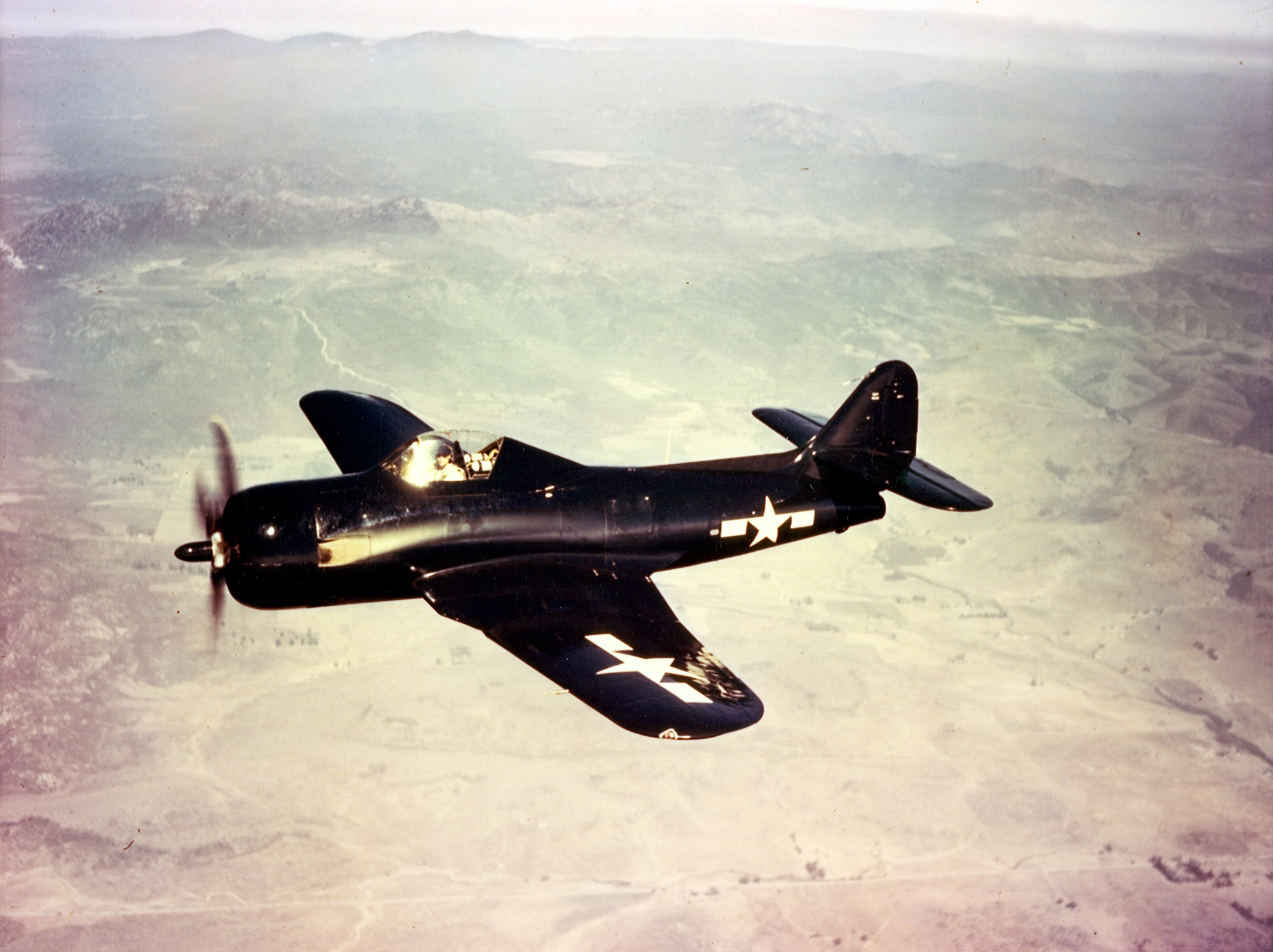
VF-41 FR-1 in 1945

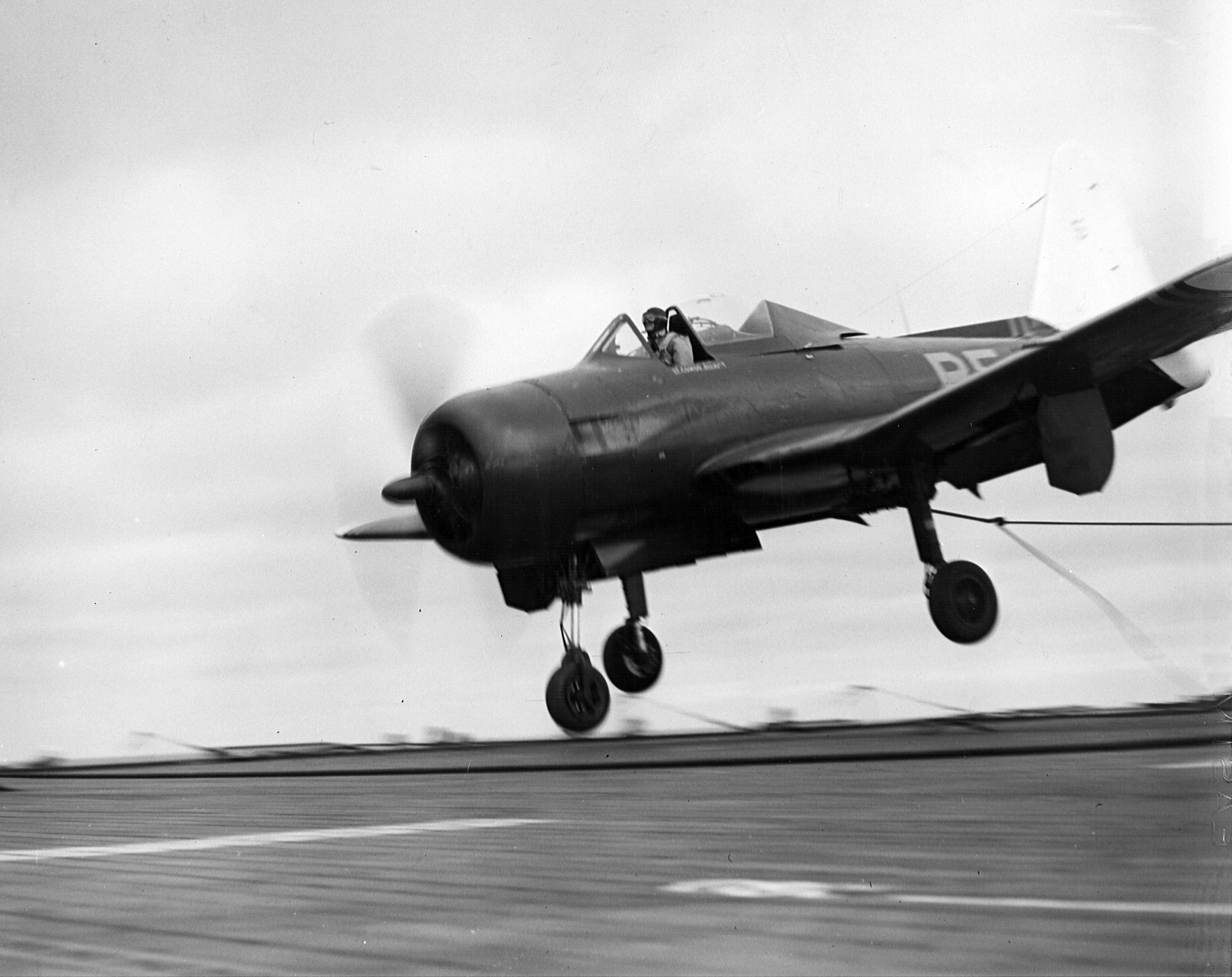
VF-41 FR-1 landing on USS Bairoko in 1946

Following the disestablishment of VF-66 in October 1945 its pilots and FR-1 Fireballs were transferred to VF-41.

In November 1945 the squadron was attempting to qualify its pilots for carrier operations, but only 14 of its 22 pilots made the six required takeoffs and landings with a number of accidents occurring when the nose gear failed on landing. On 6 November 1945, a VF-41 FR-1 unintentionally became the first aircraft to land under jet power on an aircraft carrier after its radial engine failed on final approach to USS Wake Island, the pilot managed to start the jet engine and land, barely catching the arrestor wire before hitting the ship's crash barrier.

The squadron eventually carrier-qualified on USS Bairoko in March 1946, but FR-1 nose gear problems persisted and cut the cruise short. Ryan installed a steel fork for the nosewheel, but inspections also revealed evidence of partial wing failures so the aircraft was limited to maneuvers not to exceed 5 Gs. VF-41 suffered three fatal accidents in 1946, one aircraft collided with the target banner during gunnery practice and spun into the water, a few months later, the squadron commander was performing a barrel roll when his wing broke off and he struck another FR-1, killing both pilots.

VF-1E conducted carrier qualification in March 1947 aboard USS Badoeng Strait and only eight pilots successfully qualified, not least because the FR-1s were proving to be too fragile to endure repeated carrier landings. During one brief deployment in June aboard USS Rendova, one aircraft broke in two during a hard landing. Subsequent inspections of the squadron's aircraft showed signs of structural failure and all the FR-1s were withdrawn by 1 August 1947.

== Home port assignments ==
- NAS Sand Point

== Aircraft assignment ==
- F6F-5 Hellcat
- FR-1 Fireball

== See also ==
- History of the United States Navy
- List of inactive United States Navy aircraft squadrons
- List of United States Navy aircraft squadrons
