= Ryan FR Fireball =

American World War II-era jet and piston-engined fighter aircraft

FR-1 Fireball
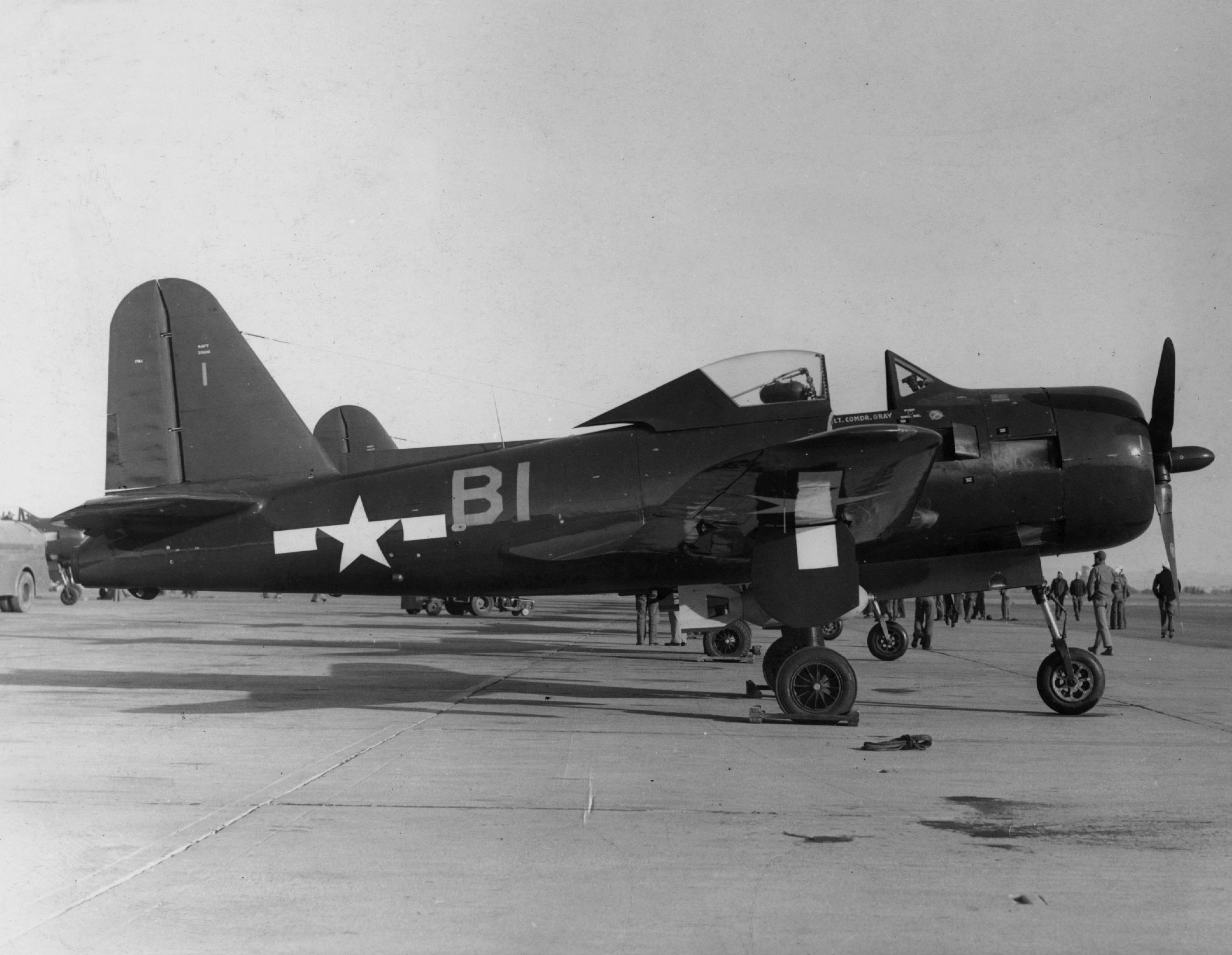
- An FR-1 Fireball of VF-66 at NAS North Island, 1945

General information
- Type: Fighter
- National origin: United States
- Manufacturer: Ryan Aeronautical
- Primary user: United States Navy
- Number built: 71

History
- Manufactured: 1944–1945
- Introduction date: March 1945
- First flight: 25 June 1944
- Retired: 1 August 1947
- Developed into: Ryan XF2R Dark Shark

The Ryan FR Fireball is an American mixed-power (piston and jet-powered) fighter aircraft designed by Ryan Aeronautical for the United States Navy during World War II. It was the Navy's first aircraft with a jet engine. Only 66 aircraft were built before Japan surrendered in August 1945. The FR-1 Fireball equipped a single squadron before the war's end, but did not see combat. The aircraft ultimately proved to lack the structural strength required for operations aboard aircraft carriers and was withdrawn in mid-1947.

== Design and development ==
Design of the FR-1 began in 1943 to a proposal instigated by Rear Admiral John S. McCain Sr. for a mixed-powered fighter because early jet engines had sluggish acceleration that was considered unsafe and unsuitable for carrier operations. Ryan received a contract for three XFR-1 prototypes and one static test airframe on 11 February 1943 with the first two prototypes delivered in 14 months. Another contract was placed for 100 aircraft on 2 December 1943 and a later contract on 31 January 1945 increased the total of FR-1s on order to 700.

The XFR-1 was a single-seat, low-wing monoplane with tricycle landing gear. A 1,350-horsepower (1,010 kW) Wright R-1820-72W Cyclone radial engine was mounted in the fighter's nose while a 1,600 lbf (7,100 N) General Electric I-16 (later redesignated as the J-31) turbojet was mounted in the rear fuselage. It was fed by ducts in each wing root which meant that the wing had to be relatively thick to house the ducts and the outward-retracting main landing gear. To simplify the fuel system, both engines used the same grade of avgas. Two self-sealing fuel tanks were housed in the fuselage, one of 130 US gallons (490 L; 110 imp gal) and the other of 50 US gallons (190 L; 42 imp gal). The cockpit was positioned just forward of the leading edge of the wing and the pilot was provided with a bubble canopy which gave him excellent visibility. The XFR-1 had the first laminar flow airfoil in a Navy carrier aircraft.

The Fireball was armed with four .50 in (12.7 mm) M2 Browning machine guns with 300 rounds per gun. They were mounted in the center section of the wing, immediately outboard of the air intakes for the jet engine. Four 5-inch (127 mm) rockets could be carried under each outer wing panel and two hardpoints were provided under the center section for 1,000 lb (454 kg) bombs or 100 US gal (380 L; 83 imp gal) drop tanks. Armor plates were provided in front and behind the pilot's seat and for the oil cooler.

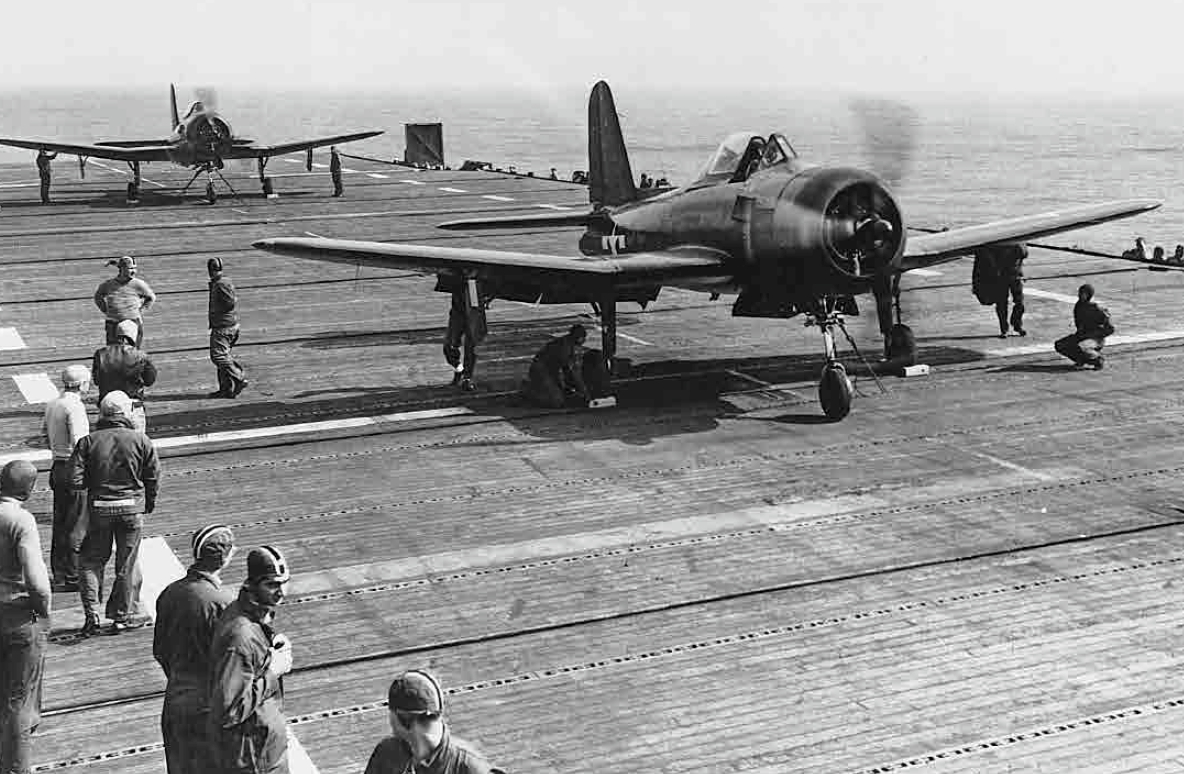
FR-1 trials aboard Ranger, May 1945

The first XFR-1 made its first flight on 25 June 1944 without its jet engine, but this was installed shortly afterward. The second prototype first flew on 20 September 1944. Test flights confirmed wind tunnel tests that revealed a lack of longitudinal stability because the center of gravity had been miscalculated. In addition, the circular rear fuselage of the FR-1 gave less stability than the slab-style fuselage of the Grumman F4F Wildcat that was used as a model for the stability calculations. A new tail with enlarged vertical and horizontal stabilizers was designed and retrofitted to the prototypes. The original Douglas double-slotted flaps proved to be unsatisfactory during flight testing, but all three prototypes and the first 14 production aircraft were built with them before they were replaced with a single-slotted flap.

The first prototype was lost in a crash at NAS China Lake on 13 October 1944. Investigation showed that the wing structure was not strong enough to resist compressibility effects. This was cured by doubling the number of rivets in the outer wing panels. The second prototype crashed on 25 March 1945 when the pilot failed to recover from a dive from 35,000 feet (10,670 m), probably also due to compressibility effects. The third prototype crashed on 5 April when the canopy blew off during a high-speed pass over Lindbergh Field.

Operational testing by the Naval Air Test Center at Naval Air Station Patuxent River that included carrier acceptability tests revealed additional problems: The piston engine tended to overheat until electrically operated cowl flaps were installed, the catapult hooks had to be moved, and the nosewheel oleo shock strut had to be lengthened by 3 inches (76 mm). Carrier suitability tests began aboard the escort carrier Charger in early January 1945. The aircraft successfully made five catapult takeoffs using the piston engine as well as three takeoffs using both engines. No problems were reported when landing aboard the carrier.

The FR-1 Fireball was further developed into the XFR-2 which utilized a 1,425 hp (1,063 kW) Wright R-1820-74W in place of the -72W. One single airframe was converted to this configuration. No prototypes were built for the next proposed variant, the FR-3, which would have used a General Electric I-20 turbojet. Both of these projects were canceled with the end of the war. The fastest Fireball was the XFR-4, which had a Westinghouse J34 turbojet and was approximately 100 mph (160 km/h) faster than the FR-1. The turbojet's air intakes were moved from the wing roots to the fuselage in front of the wing; they were covered by electrically powered doors to lessen drag when the aircraft was flying only on its piston engine. The Fireball's fuselage was lengthened by 8 inches (203 mm) to accommodate the larger engine and the leading edge extension of the wing root that housed the air intakes was also removed. The XFR-4 was intended to serve as a testbed for the turbojet installation on the XF2R-1 Dark Shark. This was the final variant; the piston engine was replaced with a General Electric XT31-GE-2 turboprop, but only one prototype was built.

On 2 December 1943, orders for 100 production FR-1s were placed, with a follow-up order of 1,000 additional fighters in January 1945. All of the contracts were contingent on the aircraft successfully completing carrier trials. Only 66 Fireballs were completed by November 1945 as orders for 1,044 FR-1s were canceled on VJ Day.

== Operational history ==
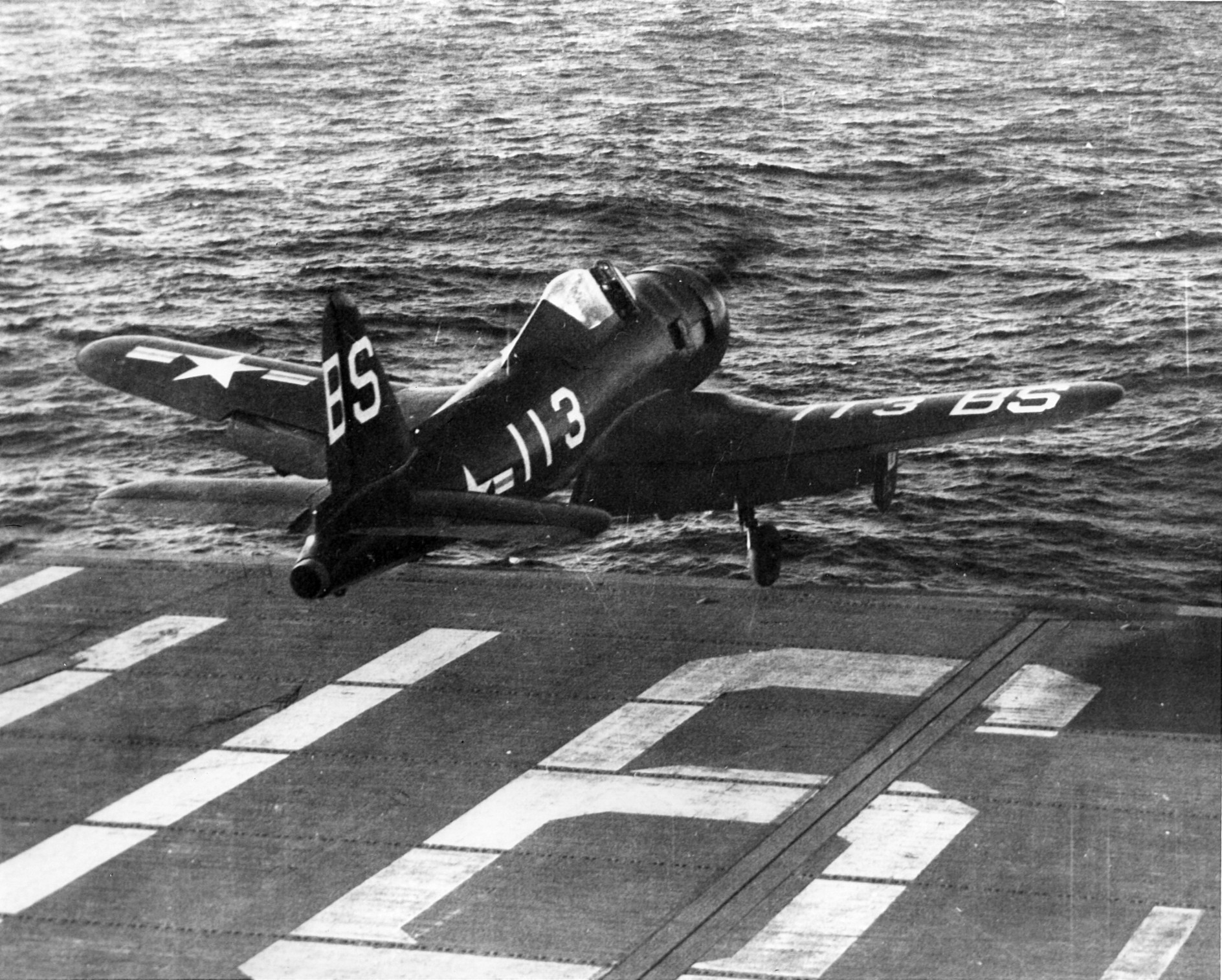
An FR-1 launching from the escort carrier Badoeng Strait, 1947

One squadron, VF-66, received its first Fireballs in March 1945, but they never saw combat. On 1 May, three of the squadron's aircraft were craned aboard the carrier Ranger to attempt to qualify seven pilots, but two of the fighters were damaged while landing. One missed the arresting gear and hit the crash barrier while the other aircraft's nose gear collapsed. The following month the pilots qualified and were on pre-embarkation leave when the Japanese surrendered. The squadron was decommissioned on 18 October with all pilots and aircraft transferred to VF-41.

It has been claimed that a Fireball of VF-41 became the first aircraft to land under jet power on an aircraft carrier, albeit without prior planning, on 6 November 1945. After the radial engine of an FR-1 failed on final approach to the escort carrier Wake Island, the pilot managed to start the jet engine and land, barely catching the last arrestor wire before hitting the ship's crash barrier. (Note: A month later on 4 December 1945, a Sea Vampire piloted by Royal Navy Captain Eric "Winkle" Brown was the first aircraft to perform an intentional and planned jet-powered landing on an aircraft carrier.) However, there is evidence that the aircraft may have still benefited from some residual power from its Wright R-1820 and therefore the landing was not purely under jet power. The squadron was attempting to qualify its pilots for carrier operations during this time, but only 14 of its 22 pilots made the six required takeoffs and landings. A number of accidents occurred when the nose gear failed on landing, but the pilots were at least partly responsible as they were slamming the nose gear onto the deck after landing on the main gear.

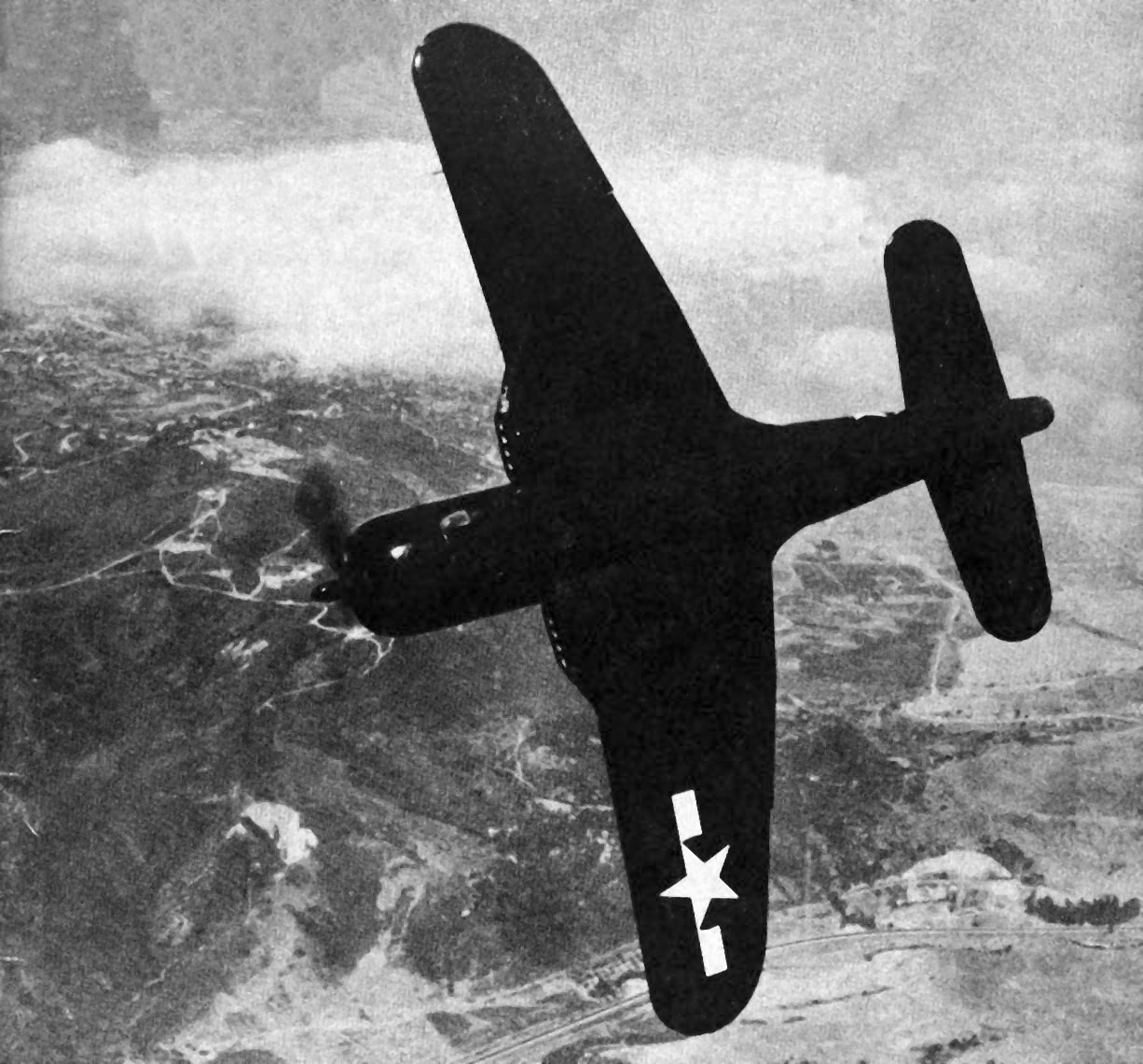
Underside of a VF-66 aircraft, 1945, illustrating the wing planform and the wing-root air intakes

The squadron qualified on the escort carrier Bairoko in March 1946, but nose gear problems persisted and cut the cruise short. Ryan installed a steel fork for the nosewheel, but inspections also revealed evidence of partial wing failures so the aircraft was limited to maneuvers not to exceed 5 Gs. VF-41 suffered three fatal accidents in 1946 before being redesignated as VF-1E on 15 November 1946. One ensign collided with the target banner during gunnery practice and spun into the water. A few months later, the squadron commander was performing a barrel roll when his wing broke off and he struck another Fireball, killing both pilots.

VF-1E conducted carrier qualification in March 1947 aboard the escort carrier Badoeng Strait and only eight pilots successfully qualified, not least because the FR-1s were proving to be too fragile to endure repeated carrier landings. During one brief deployment in June aboard Rendova, one aircraft broke in two during a hard landing. Subsequent inspections of the squadron's aircraft showed signs of structural failure and all the Fireballs were withdrawn by 1 August 1947.

After the withdrawal of the type from service, except for a few examples retained for modifications and testing, the FR-1s were scrapped.

External videos
- Footage of the FR-1 being tested

== Variants ==
XFR-1
Military designation of the prototype Model 28 aircraft, three built.
FR-1 Fireball
Single-seat fighter aircraft, 66 built.
FR-2
Conversion with a Wright R-1820-74W replacing earlier piston engine, one aircraft modified.
FR-3
Proposed variant with a General Electric I-20 replacing earlier jet engine; never built.
XFR-4
Variant with Westinghouse J34; one built. J34-WE-12.

== Operators ==
United States

- United States Navy

The "Firebirds" squadron was known under three names:

- VF-66 (March 1945 – 15 October 1945)
- VF-41 (15 October 1945 – 1 August 1947), redesignated VF-1E on 15 November 1946.

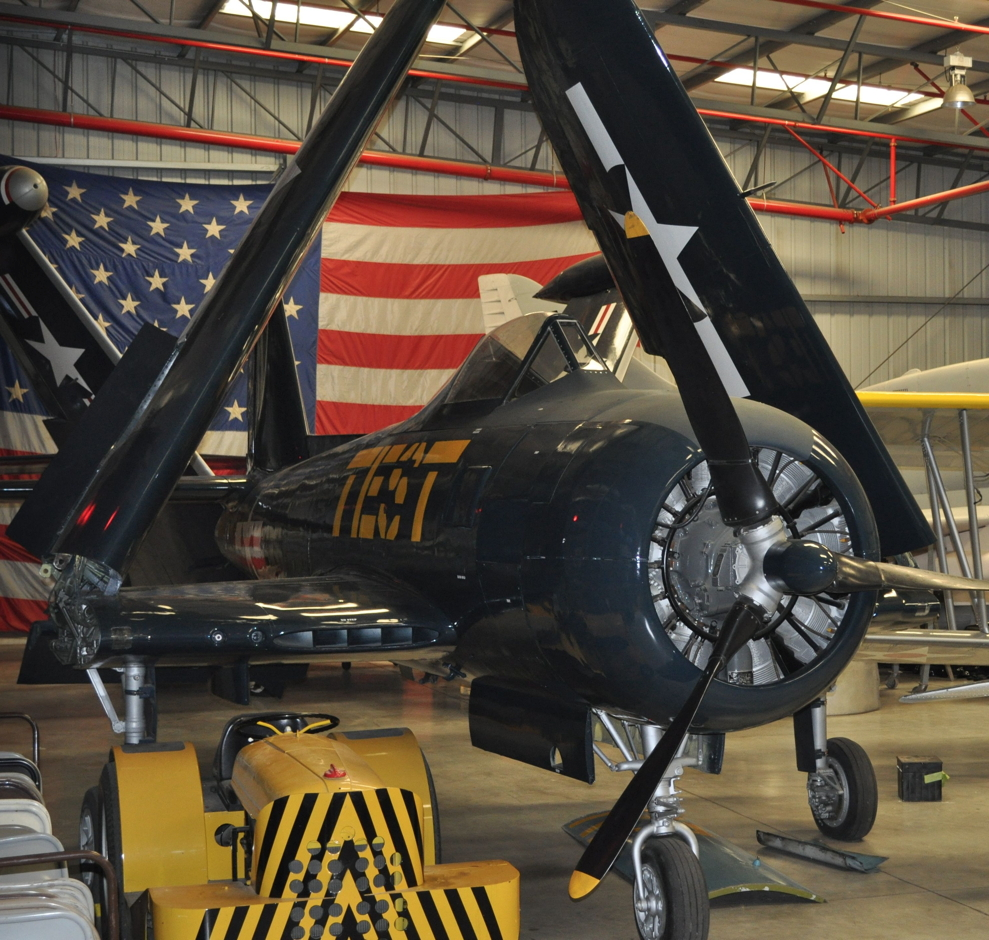
FR-1 Fireball at the Planes of Fame Museum in Chino, California

== Surviving aircraft ==
Only a single example, FR-1 BuNo 39657, still survives. Deployed first to the NASA Ames Research Center, the aircraft served as an instructional airframe at a technical school before being acquired by the Planes of Fame Air Museum at Chino, California from a technical school located in San Luis Obispo, California in the 1960s. After restoration to static display condition, 39657 was rolled out at Chino on 13 June 2009.

== Specifications (FR-1) ==

Data from United States Navy Aircraft since 1911 and Ryan FR-1 Fireball and XF2R-1 Darkshark

General characteristics

- Crew: 1
- Length: 32 ft 4 in (9.86 m)
- Wingspan: 40 ft 0 in (12.19 m)
- Height: 13 ft 11 in (4.24 m)
- Wing area: 275 sq ft (25.5 m^{2})
- Airfoil: root: NACA 65-117 a=1; tip: NACA 65-115 a=.5
- Empty weight: 7,689 lb (3,488 kg)
- Gross weight: 11,652 lb (5,285 kg)
- Powerplant: 1 × Wright R-1820-72W Cyclone 9-cylinder air-cooled radial piston engine, 1,350 hp (1,010 kW)
- Powerplant: 1 × General Electric J31-GE-3 centrifugal-flow turbojet engine, 1,600 lbf (7.1 kN) thrust
- Propellers: 3-bladed constant-speed fully-feathering propeller

Performance

- Maximum speed: 404 mph (650 km/h, 351 kn) both engines

276 mph (240 kn; 444 km/h)

- Cruise speed: 152 mph (245 km/h, 132 kn) piston engine only
- Ferry range: 1,620 mi (2,610 km, 1,410 nmi) (with 2 drop tanks)
- Service ceiling: 43,100 ft (13,100 m)
- Rate of climb: 1,800 ft/min (9 m/s) (Piston engine only, with 1 drop tank)

Armament

- Guns: 4 × .50 in (12.7 mm) M2 Browning machine guns with 300 rpg
- Rockets: 8 × 5-inch (127 mm) rockets under wings
- Bombs: 2 × 1,000 lb (454 kg) bombs

== See also ==
Related development

- Ryan XF2R Dark Shark

Aircraft of comparable role, configuration, and era

- Caproni Campini Ca.183bis
- Curtiss XF15C
- Mikoyan-Gurevich I-250
- Sukhoi Su-5

Related lists

- List of United States Navy aircraft designations (pre-1962)
- List of military aircraft of the United States
