= Ryan XF2R Dark Shark =

Experimental aircraft built for the United States Navy

XF2R Dark Shark
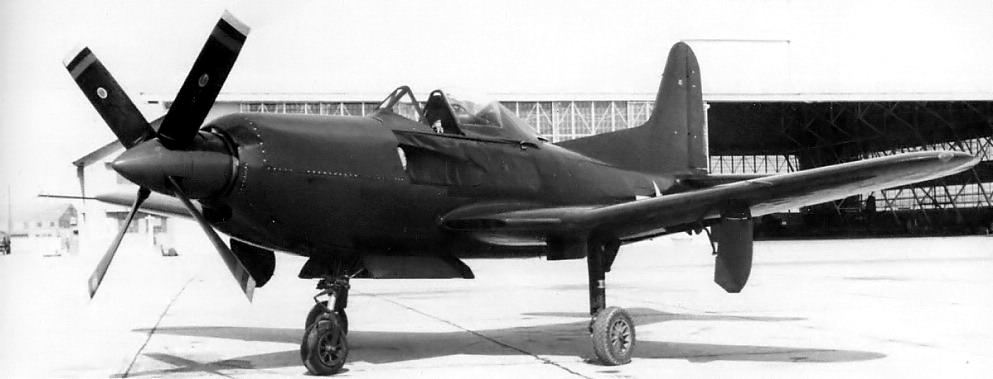

General information
- Type: Fighter
- National origin: United States
- Manufacturer: Ryan Aeronautical
- Status: Canceled
- Number built: 1 prototype

History
- First flight: November 1946
- Developed from: Ryan FR Fireball

The Ryan XF2R Dark Shark was an American experimental aircraft built for the United States Navy that combined turboprop and turbojet propulsion. It was based on Ryan Aeronautical's earlier FR Fireball, but replaced the Fireball's piston engine with a turboprop engine.

== Design and development ==
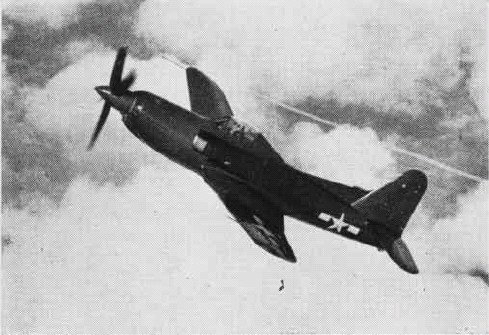
The XF2R-1 in flight.

The XF2R Dark Shark was based on Ryan Aeronautical's earlier FR Fireball, but replaced the Fireball's piston engine with a General Electric T31 turboprop engine driving a 4-bladed Hamilton Standard propeller. The turboprop made for much improved performance over the Fireball, and Ryan proposed the XF2R-2 to use a Westinghouse J34 turbojet in place of the General Electric J31 used as the auxiliary turbojet for the XF2R-1. The XF2R-2 also had a squared-off vertical stabilizer and jet intakes moved to the sides of the forward fuselage with NACA ducts instead of the inlets in the wing leading edge for the XF2R-1.

Although the Dark Shark proved to be a capable aircraft, it never progressed beyond the prototype stage and the XF2R-2 was canceled without being built because the Navy had abandoned the idea of the combination fighter and was instead looking into all-jet fighters, which it considered superior.

== Specifications (XF2R-1) ==
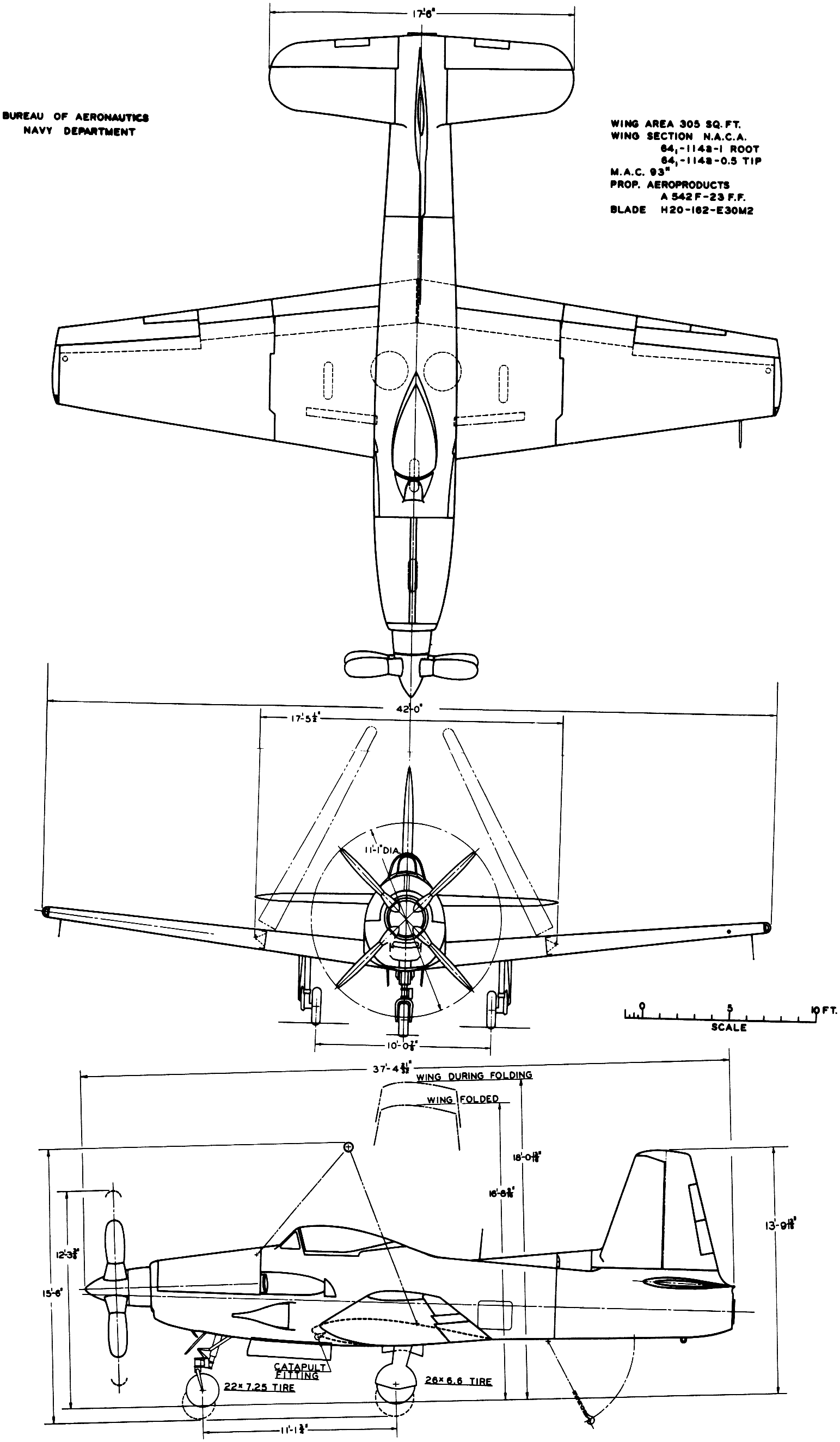
3-view line drawing of the Ryan XF2R Dark Shark

Data from The Complete Book of Fighters

General characteristics

- Crew: 1
- Length: 36 ft 0 in (10.97 m)
- Wingspan: 42 ft 0 in (12.80 m)
- Height: 14 ft 0 in (4.27 m)
- Wing area: 305 sq ft (28.3 m^{2})
- Airfoil: root: NACA 65-117 a=1; tip: NACA 65-115 a=.5
- Gross weight: 11,000 lb (4,990 kg)
- Powerplant: 1 × General Electric T31 turboprop engine, 1,760 shp (1,310 kW)
- Powerplant: 1 × General Electric J31 centrifugal-flow turbojet engine, 1,600 lbf (7.1 kN) thrust
- Propellers: 4-bladed constant-speed fully-feathering propeller

Performance

- Maximum speed: 497 mph (800 km/h, 432 kn) at sea level
- Service ceiling: 39,100 ft (11,900 m)
- Rate of climb: 4,850 ft/min (24.6 m/s)
- Wing loading: 36.1 lb/sq ft (176 kg/m^{2})

Armament

- Guns: 4 × .50-inch (12.7 mm) M2 Browning machine guns

== See also ==
Related development

- Ryan FR Fireball

Aircraft of comparable role, configuration, and era

- Convair XP-81
- Curtiss XF15C
- Grumman XTB3F Guardian

Related lists

- List of fighter aircraft
- List of United States Navy aircraft designations (pre-1962)
- List of military aircraft of the United States
