= Consolidated Vultee XP-81 =

Prototype fighter aircraft

XP-81
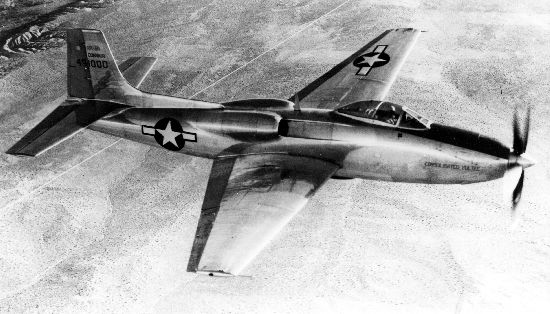

General information
- Type: Escort fighter
- Manufacturer: Consolidated Vultee Aircraft Corporation
- Status: Canceled
- Primary user: United States Army Air Forces
- Number built: 2

History
- First flight: 11 February 1945

The Consolidated Vultee XP-81 (later redesignated ZXF-81) is a development of the Consolidated Vultee Aircraft Corporation to build a single seat, long range escort fighter that combined use of both turbojet and turboprop engines. Although promising, the lack of suitable engines combined with the end of World War II doomed the project.

== Design and development ==
Two prototype aircraft were ordered on 11 February 1944 that were designated XP-81. The engine selection was an attempt to couple the high-speed capability of the jet engine with the endurance offered by the propeller engine. The XP-81 was designed to use the General Electric TG-100 turboprop engine (later designated XT31 by the US military) in the nose driving a four-bladed propeller and a GE J33 turbojet in the rear fuselage. The turboprop would be used for normal flight and cruising and the turbojet added for high-speed flight.

== Operational history ==
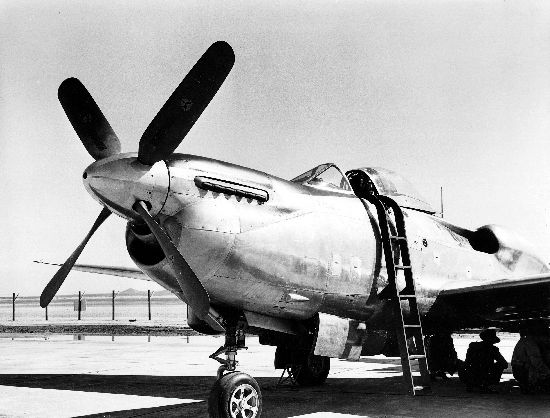
The original Merlin engine installation in the XP-81

The first XP-81 (serial 44-91000) was completed in January 1945 but because of developmental problems the turboprop engine was not ready for installation. A decision was then made to mount a complete V-1650-7 engine package from a P-51D aircraft in place of the turboprop for initial flight tests. This was done in a week and the Merlin-powered XP-81 was sent to the Muroc airbase where it flew for the first time on 11 February 1945. During 10 flight test hours, the XP-81 displayed good handling characteristics except for inadequate directional stability due to the longer forward portion of the fuselage (this was rectified by enlarging the vertical tail).

While 13 YP-81 pre-production aircraft had been ordered, the capture of Guam and Saipan obviated the need for long-range, high-speed escort fighters and then, just before VJ Day the contract was cancelled, after 85% of the engineering was completed. The YP-81 was to be essentially the same as the prototype but with a lighter and more powerful GE TG-110 (XT41) turboprop engine, the wing moved aft 10 inches (0.25 m), and armament of either six .50 cal (12.7 mm) machine guns or six 20 mm cannon.

After the XP-81 was returned to Vultee Field, the TG-100 turboprop was installed and flight testing resumed, including the first flight by an American turboprop-powered aircraft on 21 December 1945. However, the turboprop engine was not able to produce its designed power; producing only the same output as the Merlin (1,490 hp or 1112 kW) with the resultant performance limited to that of the Merlin-engined version.

With the termination of hostilities, the two prototypes continued to be tested until 1947 when they were both consigned to a bombing range as photography targets.

== Surviving aircraft ==
- Both prototypes are in storage at the National Museum of the United States Air Force near Dayton, Ohio.

== Operators ==
United States

- United States Army Air Forces (testing only)

== Specifications (XP-81) ==
Note: Performance is estimated with "full powered" TG-100. Armament is projected only.

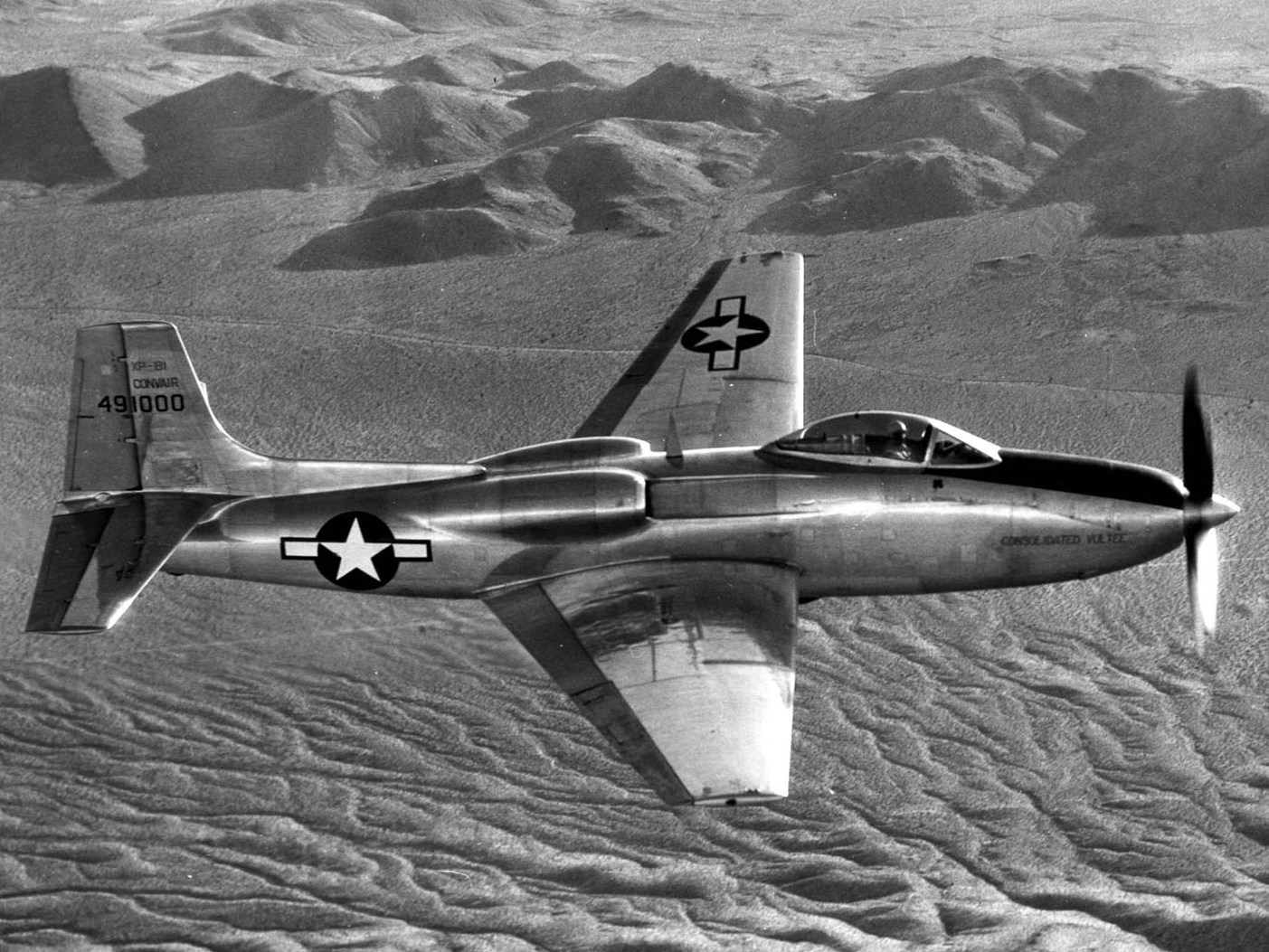
XP-81 side view.

Data from Jane's all the World's Aircraft 1947; General Dynamics Aircraft and Their Predecessors

General characteristics

- Crew: 1
- Length: 44 ft 8 in (13.61 m)
- Wingspan: 50 ft 6 in (15.39 m)
- Height: 13 ft 6 in (4.11 m)
- Wing area: 425 sq ft (39.5 m^{2})
- Empty weight: 12,979 lb (5,887 kg)
- Gross weight: 24,650 lb (11,181 kg)
- Powerplant: 1 × General Electric T31-GE-3 turboprop engine, 2,300 shp (1,700 kW) plus 600 lbf (2.7 kN) residual thrust (estimated power of production engine)
- Powerplant: 1 × General Electric J33-GE-5 centrifugal flow turbojet, 3,750 lbf (16.7 kN) thrust (planned engine for production aircraft)
- Propellers: 4-bladed constant-speed propeller, 12 ft (3.7 m) diameter

Performance

- Maximum speed: 478 mph (769 km/h, 415 kn) at sea level; 507 mph (816 km/h) at 30,000 ft (9,100 m)
- Cruise speed: 275 mph (443 km/h, 239 kn) at 30,000 ft (9,100 m)
- Range: 2,500 mi (4,000 km, 2,200 nmi)
- Service ceiling: 47,000 ft (14,000 m)
- Rate of climb: 5,300 ft/min (27 m/s)
- Wing loading: 106 lb/sq ft (520 kg/m^{2})

Armament

- Guns: 6 × 20 mm (0.8 in) cannon or 6 × .50 cal (12.7 mm) machine guns
- Bombs: 2,000 lb (910 kg) of bombs

== See also ==
Related development

- Vultee XA-41

Aircraft of comparable role, configuration, and era

- Fisher P-75 Eagle
- North American F-82 Twin Mustang
- Republic XP-72
- Ryan XF2R Dark Shark

Related lists

- List of fighter aircraft
- List of military aircraft of the United States

== Bibliography ==
- Bridgman, Leonard, ed. (1947). Jane's All the World's Aircraft 1947. London: Sampson Low, Marston & Co.
- Ginter, Steve (2006). Consolidated Vultee XP-81. Air Force Legends. Vol. 214 (First ed.). Simi Valley, California: Ginter Books. ISBN 0-942612-87-6.
- Green, William (1961). War Planes of the Second World War, Volume Four: Fighters. [S.l.]: Macdonald & Co. ISBN 0-356-01448-7.
- Green, William; Swanborough, Gordon (1978). US Army Air Force Fighters: Part 2. London: Macdonald and Jane's. ISBN 0-354-01072-7.
- Jenkins, Dennis R.; Landis, Tony R. (2008). Experimental & Prototype U.S. Air Force Jet Fighters. North Branch, Minnesota: Specialty Press. ISBN 978-1-58007-111-6.
- Knaack, Marcelle Size (1978). Encyclopedia of US Air Force Aircraft and Missile Systems. Washington, DC: Office of Air Force History, US Air Force. ISBN 0-912799-59-5.
- "Propjet and Plain". Flight: 217–218. 28 February 1946.
- Thompson, Jonathan (1992). Vultee Aircraft 1932-1947. Santa Ana, California: Narkiewicz/Thompson. ISBN 0-913322-02-4.
- Wegg, John (1990). General Dynamics Aircraft and Their Predecessors. Annapolis, Maryland: Naval Institute Press. ISBN 0-87021-233-8.
- Winchester, Jim (2005). The World's Worst Aircraft: From Pioneering Failures to Multimillion Dollar Disasters. London: Amber Books. ISBN 1-904687-34-2.
