= General Electric T31 =

American turboprop engine

T31
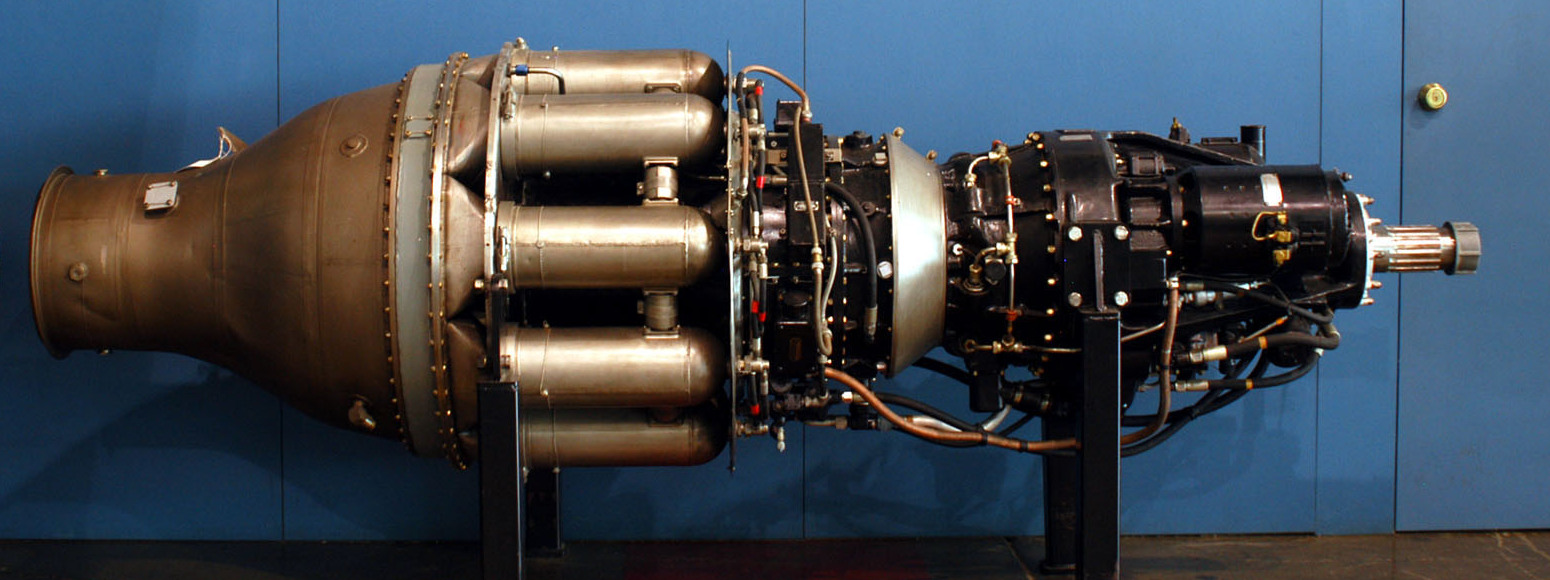
- A T31 in the Presidential Gallery of the National Museum of the United States Air Force
- Type: Turboprop
- National origin: United States
- Manufacturer: General Electric
- First run: May 1945
- Major applications: Consolidated Vultee XP-81; Ryan XF2R Dark Shark
- Number built: 28

The General Electric T31 (company designation TG-100A) was the first turboprop engine designed and built in the United States.

== Design and development ==
The TG-100A benefited from the Anglo/American technology exchange with one of its designers, Glenn Warren, stating that one of the most important British contributions was the concept of multiple combustion cans. The GE axial compressor design was directly influenced by NACA with their 8-stage compressor. NACA had developed the theory and designed and tested the compressor.

General Electric adopted a single shaft engine configuration, like the Rolls-Royce Dart , where the turbine drove both the compressor and the propeller reduction gearbox. This epicyclic gearbox was relatively long. Air entered a screened annular intake directly behind the gearbox. After compression, the air entered the combustion chambers in a radially outward direction. These chambers were mounted around the casing of the axial compressor, presumably to shorten the shaft. A portion of the air destined for the combustion chambers was diverted to cool the turbine nozzle guide vanes before entering the outer part of the combustion chambers. Combustion products exiting the chambers discharged through the single stage turbine before entering a rapidly converging annular exhaust terminated by a circular tail pipe. Although the 14 stage all-axial compressor produced a decent pressure ratio (approximately 6.15:1 at design speed; 5.3:1 at Maximum Power, SLS, ISA), it was not particularly efficient. A large diameter turbine facilitated the use of a single stage, whereas the Rolls-Royce Dart (which had a similar engine cycle) required 3 stages.

The General Electric XT31 was first used in the experimental Consolidated Vultee XP-81. The XP-81 first flew in December 1945, the first aircraft to use a combination of turboprop and turbojet power.

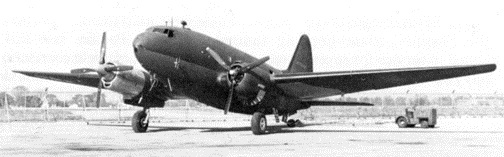
The XC-113, with T31 in the No. 2 position

The T31 engine was the first American turboprop engine to power an aircraft. It made its initial flight in the Consolidated Vultee XP-81 on 21 December 1945. The T31 was mounted in the nose; an Allison J33 turbojet engine mounted in the rear fuselage provided added thrust. The T31 was also used on the Navy XF2R-1, similarly powered by a turboprop/turbojet engine combination. The engine was to have been flown experimentally on a Curtiss XC-113 (a converted Curtiss C-46), but the experiment was abandoned after the XC-113 was involved in a ground accident. Only 28 T31s were built; none were used in production aircraft, but improved production turboprop engines were developed from the technology pioneered by the T31.

A derivative of the T31, the General Electric TG-110A, given the military designation T41, was ordered but subsequently cancelled.

== Applications ==
- Consolidated Vultee XP-81
- Curtiss-Wright XC-113
- Ryan XF2R Dark Shark

== Specification (TG-100A) ==
Data from

==== General characteristics ====
- Type: Single Shaft Turboprop
- Length: 116in (295cm) including exhaust cone, but not the propeller
- Diameter: 37in (94cm) maximum overall
- Dry weight: 1980lb (898Kg) including accessories

==== Components ====
- Compressor: 14-stage axial
- Combustors: 8 can combustion chambers
- Turbine: axial single-stage
- Fuel type: Kerosene
- Oil system: pressure spray

==== Performance ====
- Maximum power output: 1,700 hp (1,300 kW) (shp) Maximum Power, SLS, ISA at 13,000 rpm. (1,145 propeller rpm)
- Residual thrust: 550 lbf (2.4 kN)
- Reduction gear ratio: 0.0881:1
- Overall pressure ratio: approximately 5.3:1 @ Maximum Power, SLS, ISA
- Air mass flow: 21 lb/s (9.525Kg/s) @ Maximum Power, SLS, ISA; approximately 23.7lb/s (10.75Kg/s) @ design speed
- Turbine inlet temperature: 1333K (2400R) approx Rotor Inlet Temperature would have been lower because of NGV cooling
- Specific fuel consumption: 0.941lb/hr/shp (0.572Kg/hr/KW) approx
- Power-to-weight ratio: 0.859 shp/lb (1.41 KW/Kg)

== Specification (T31-GE-3) ==
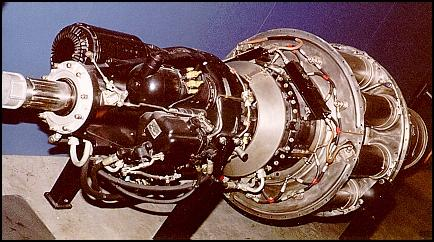
A T31 at Presidential Gallery, National Museum of the United States Air Force

Data from World Encyclopaedia of Aero Engines 5th Ed.

==== General characteristics ====
- Type: Single Shaft Turboprop
- Length:
- Diameter:
- Dry weight: 1,980 lb (900 kg)

==== Components ====
- Compressor: 14-stage axial
- Combustors: 8 can combustion chambers
- Turbine: axial single-stage
- Fuel type: Kerosene
- Oil system: pressure spray

==== Performance ====
- Maximum power output: 2,300 hp (1,700 kW) (shp) (design) at 13,000 rpm. (1,145 propeller rpm)
- Residual thrust: 600 lbf (2.7 kN)
- Reduction gear ratio: 0.0881:1
- Power-to-weight ratio: 1.162 hp/lb (1.910 kW/kg)

== See also ==
Related development

- General Electric J35

Comparable engines

- Rolls-Royce RB.50 Trent

Related lists

- List of aircraft engines
