= VF-66 =

Fighter Squadron 66
- Active: 1 January – 18 October 1945
- Country: United States
- Branch: United States Navy
- Role: Fighter
- Nickname(s): Firebirds

Aircraft flown
- Fighter: FR-1 Fireball

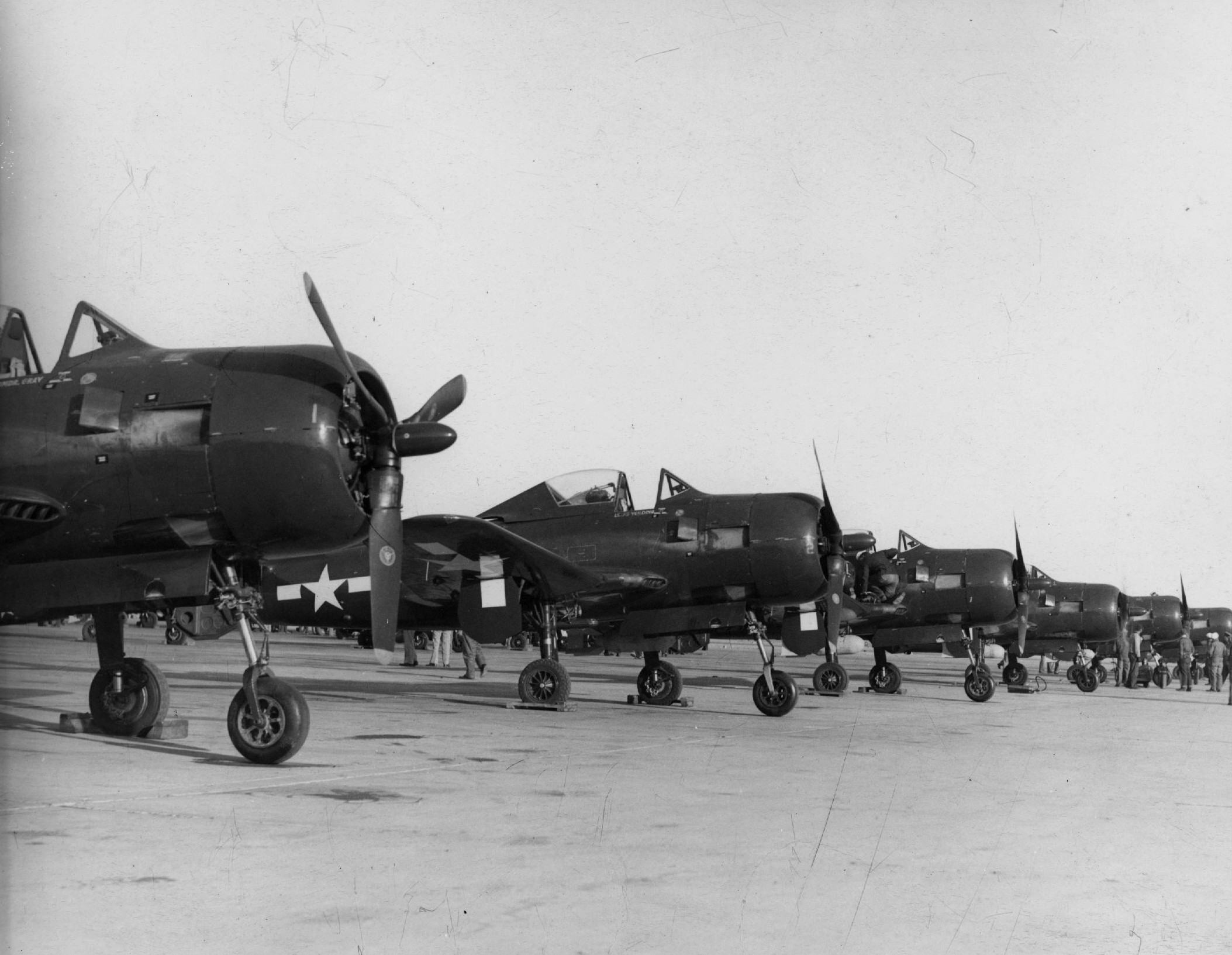
VF-66 FR-1s at NAS North Island in 1945

Fighter Squadron 66 (VF-66), known as the Firebirds, was a fighter squadron of the United States Navy established during World War II.

== Operational history ==
VF-66 was established on 1 January 1945 equipped with the FR-1 Fireball. The squadron was slated for the Pacific, however never saw combat and was disestablished on 18 October 1945.

== See also ==
- List of inactive United States Navy aircraft squadrons
