= Gloster Meteor =

Britain's first jet fighter, 1943–1980s

Meteor
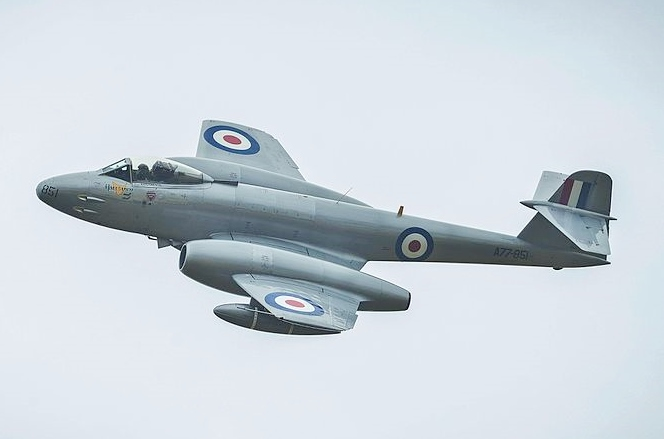
- One F.8 in flying condition operated by the RAAF's Historic Flight

General information
- Type: Fighter aircraft
- National origin: United Kingdom
- Manufacturer: Gloster Aircraft Company
- Status: Two in use as testbed aircraft (one with civil registration)
- Primary users: Royal Air Force: Royal Australian Air Force; Belgian Air Force; Argentine Air Force
- Number built: 3,947

History
- Manufactured: 1943–1955
- Introduction date: 27 July 1944
- First flight: 5 March 1943
- Retired: 1982 (RAF target tugs)

The Gloster Meteor is the first British jet fighter and the Allies' only jet aircraft to engage in combat operations during the Second World War. It was designed and primarily produced by the Gloster Aircraft Company, although its development was heavily reliant on its ground-breaking turbojet engines, pioneered by Frank Whittle and his company, Power Jets Ltd.

Development of the Meteor began in 1940, while work on its engines had been under way as early as 1936. It made its maiden flight in 1943 and commenced operations on 27 July 1944 with No. 616 Squadron RAF. The Meteor was not a sophisticated aircraft in its aerodynamics, but proved to be a successful combat fighter. Gloster's 1946 civil Meteor F.4 demonstrator G-AIDC was the first civilian-registered jet aircraft in the world. Several major variants of the Meteor incorporated technological advances during the 1940s and 1950s. Thousands of Meteors were built to fly with the RAF and other air forces and remained in use for several decades. Slower and less heavily armed than its German counterpart, the jet-powered Messerschmitt Me 262, the Meteor saw limited action in the Second World War. Meteors of the Royal Australian Air Force (RAAF) fought in the Korean War. Several other operators such as Argentina, Egypt and Israel flew Meteors in later regional conflicts. Specialised variants of the Meteor were developed for use in photographic aerial reconnaissance and as night fighters.

The Meteor was also used for research and development purposes and to break several aviation records. On 7 November 1945, the first official airspeed record by a jet aircraft was set by a Meteor F.3 at 606 miles per hour (975 km/h). In 1946, this record was broken when a Meteor F.4 reached a speed of 616 miles per hour (991 km/h). Other performance-related records were broken in categories including flight time endurance, rate of climb, and speed. On 20 September 1945, a heavily modified Meteor I, powered by two Rolls-Royce Trent turbine engines driving propellers, became the first turboprop aircraft to fly. On 10 February 1954, a specially adapted Meteor F.8, the "Meteor Prone Pilot", which placed the pilot into a prone position to counteract inertial forces, took its first flight.

In the 1950s, the Meteor became increasingly obsolete as more nations developed jet fighters, many of these newcomers having adopted a swept wing instead of the Meteor's conventional straight wing; in RAF service, the Meteor was replaced by newer types such as the Hawker Hunter and Gloster Javelin. As of 2023, two Meteors, G-JSMA and G-JWMA, remain in active service with the Martin-Baker company as ejection seat testbeds. One further aircraft in the USA remains airworthy, as does another in Australia.

== Development ==
=== Origins ===
The development of the turbojet-powered Gloster Meteor was a collaboration between the Gloster Aircraft Company and Frank Whittle's firm, Power Jets Ltd. Whittle formed Power Jets Ltd in March 1936 to develop his ideas of jet propulsion, Whittle himself serving as the company's chief engineer. For several years, attracting financial backers and aviation firms prepared to take on Whittle's radical ideas was difficult. In 1931, Armstrong-Siddeley had evaluated and rejected Whittle's proposal, finding it to be technically sound but at the limits of engineering capability. Securing funding was a persistently worrying issue throughout the early development of the engine. The first Whittle prototype jet engine, the Power Jets WU, began running trials in early 1937; shortly afterwards, both Sir Henry Tizard, chairman of the Aeronautical Research Committee, and the Air Ministry gave the project their support.

On 28 April 1939, Whittle made a visit to the premises of the Gloster Aircraft Company, where he met several key figures, such as George Carter, Gloster's chief designer. Carter took a keen interest in Whittle's project, particularly when he saw the operational Power Jets W.1 engine, and quickly used it as the basis for several rough proposals of various aircraft designs. Independently, Whittle had also been producing proposals for a high-altitude jet-powered bomber, although following the start of the Second World War and the Battle for France, a greater national emphasis arose on fighter aircraft. Power Jets and Gloster quickly formed a mutual understanding around mid-1939.

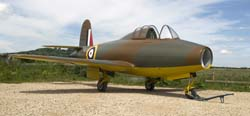
The Gloster E.28/39. The yellow undersides were standard for RAF training and prototype aircraft of the period.

In spite of ongoing infighting between Power Jets and several of its stakeholders, the Air Ministry contracted Gloster in late 1939 to manufacture a prototype aircraft powered by one of Whittle's new turbojet engines. The single-engined proof-of-concept Gloster E28/39, the first British jet-powered aircraft, conducted its maiden flight on 15 May 1941, flown by Gloster's chief test pilot, Flight Lieutenant Philip "Gerry" Sayer. The success of the E.28/39 proved the viability of jet propulsion, and Gloster pressed ahead with designs for a production fighter aircraft. Due to the limited thrust available from early jet engines, it was decided that subsequent production aircraft would be powered by a pair of turbojet engines.

In 1940, for a "military load" of 1,500 lb (680 kg), the Royal Aircraft Establishment (RAE) had advised that work on an aircraft of 8,500 lb (3,900 kg) all-up weight, with a total static thrust of 3,200 lbf (14 kN) should be started, with an 11,000 lb (5,000 kg) design for the expected, more powerful, W.2 and axial engine designs. George Carter's calculations based on the RAE work and his own investigations were that a 8,700-to-9,000-pound (3,900-to-4,100-kilogram) aircraft with two or four 20 mm cannons and six 0.303 machine guns would have a top speed of 400–431 mph (348–375 kn; 644–694 km/h) at sea level and 450–470 mph (390–410 kn; 720–760 km/h) at 30,000 feet (9,100 m). In January 1941 Gloster were told by Lord Beaverbrook that the twin jet fighter was of "unique importance", and that the company was to stop work on a night-fighter development of their F.9/37 to Specification F.18/40.

=== Prototypes ===
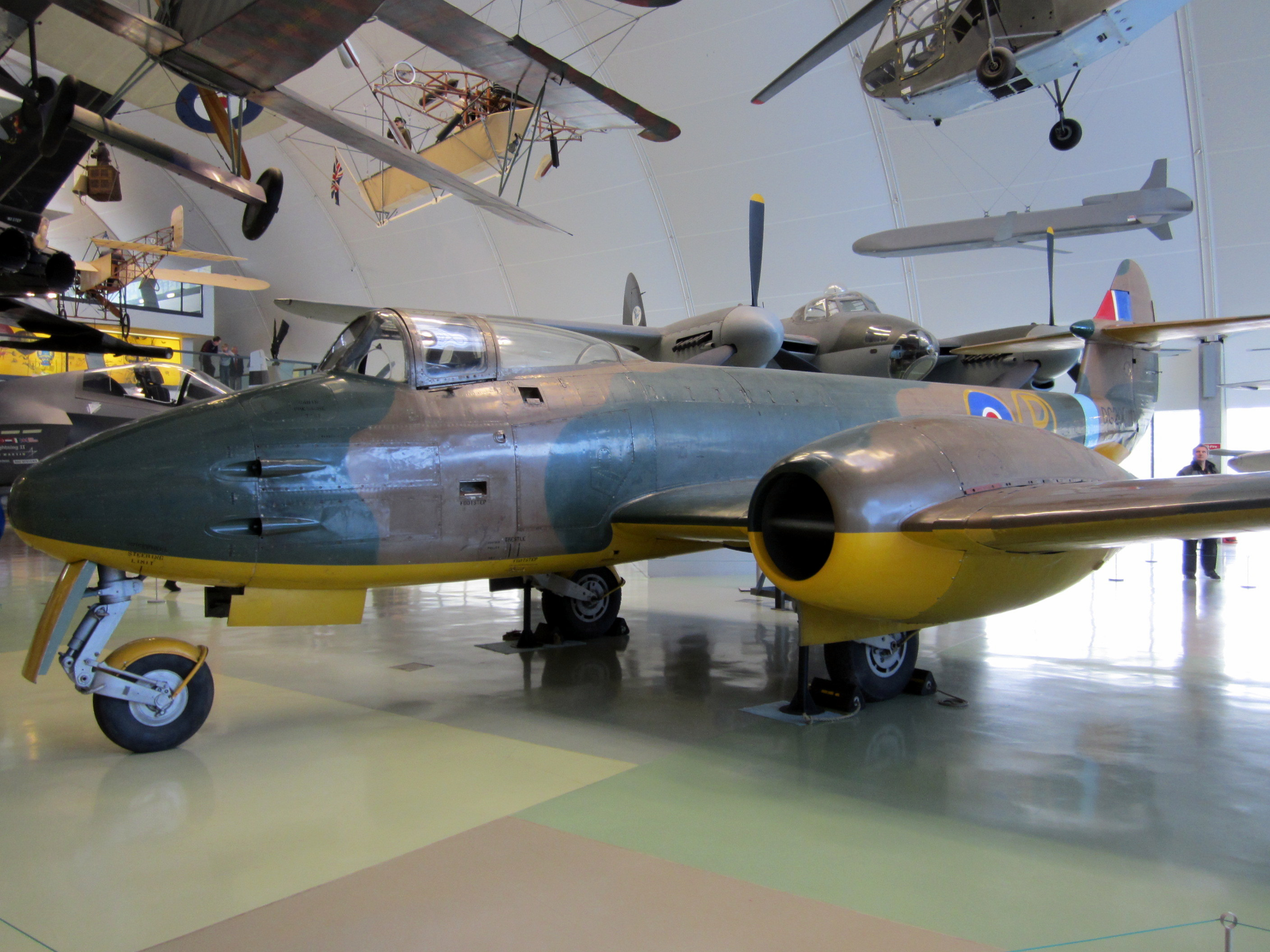
Prototype Meteor DG202/G on display at the Royal Air Force Museum London in 2011. The "/G" appended to the aircraft serial denoted that the aircraft was to have an armed guard at all times while it was on the ground.

In August 1940, Carter presented Gloster's initial proposals for a twin-engined jet fighter with a tricycle undercarriage. (Note: Carter has concluded earlier that year that, in order to produce an effective fighter aircraft with a satisfactory rate of climb and armament payload, the first jet fighter should have a twin-engine arrangement.) On 7 February 1941, Gloster received an order for twelve prototypes (later reduced to eight) under Specification F9/40. A letter of intent for the production of 300 of the new fighter, initially to be named Thunderbolt, was issued on 21 June 1941; to avoid confusion with the USAAF Republic P-47 Thunderbolt which had been issued with the same name to the RAF in 1944, the aircraft's name was subsequently changed to Meteor. (Note: Other names that were suggested for the aircraft included Scourge, Terrific, Terrifier, Terrifire, Tempest, Cyclone, Vortex, Wildfire, Avenger, Sky-rocket, Dauntless, Tyrant, Violent, Wrathful, Annihilator, Ace, and Reaper.) During the aircraft's secretive development, employees and officials made use of the codename Rampage to refer to the Meteor, as similarly the de Havilland Vampire would initially be referred to as the Spider Crab. Test locations and other key project information were also kept secret.

Although taxiing trials were carried out in 1942, it was not until the following year that any flights took place due to production and approval holdups with the Power Jets W.2 engine powering the Meteor. On 26 November 1942 production of the Meteor was ordered to stop due to the delays at subcontractor Rover, which was struggling to manufacture the W.2 engines on schedule; (Note: Much of Rover's initial difficulty in producing the engine was due to a lack of time for experimentation, aviation author Edward Shacklady commented that the W2.B engine was "rushed into production long before it was ready for such a step".) considerable interest was shown in Gloster's E.1/44 proposal for a single-engine fighter, unofficially named Ace. Gloster continued development work on the Meteor and the production-stop order was overturned in favour of the construction of six (later increased to eight) F9/40 prototypes alongside three E.1/44 prototypes. Due to the breakdown in the relationship between Rover and Powerjets and the availability of Rolls Royce's supercharger division, responsibilities for development and production of the W.2B engine were transferred to Rolls-Royce that year. (Note: The jet engine development team at Rover transferred to Rolls Royce along with the work they had done improving on Whittle's design.)

On 5 March 1943, the fifth prototype, serial DG206, powered by two substituted de Havilland Halford H.1 engines owing to problems with the intended W.2 engines, became the first Meteor to become airborne at RAF Cranwell, piloted by Michael Daunt. On the initial flight, an uncontrollable yawing motion was discovered, which led to a redesigned larger rudder; however, no difficulties had been attributed to the groundbreaking turbojet propulsion. Only two prototypes flew with de Havilland engines because of their low flight endurance. Before the first prototype aircraft had even undertaken its first flight, an extended order for 100 production-standard aircraft had been placed by the RAF.

The first Whittle-engined aircraft, DG205/G, (Note: Following the maiden flight of DG205/G, Daunt commented that "As the result of this flight, it is felt that there are distinct possibilities for the F9/50 as an operational low level fighter".) flew on 12 June 1943 (later crashing during takeoff on 27 April 1944) and was followed by DG202/G on 24 July. DG202/G was later used for deck handling tests aboard aircraft carrier HMS Pretoria Castle. DG203/G made its first flight on 9 November 1943, later becoming a ground instructional airframe. DG204/G, powered by Metrovick F.2 engines, first flew on 13 November 1943; DG204/G was lost in an accident on 4 January 1944, the cause believed to have been an engine compressor failure due to overspeed. DG208/G made its début on 20 January 1944, by which time the majority of design problems had been overcome and a production design had been approved. DG209/G was used as an engine testbed by Rolls-Royce, first flying on 18 April 1944. DG207/G was intended to be the basis for the Meteor F.2 with de Havilland engines, but it did not fly until 24 July 1945, at which time the Meteor 3 was in full production and de Havilland's attention was being redirected to the upcoming de Havilland Vampire; consequently the F.2 was cancelled.

=== Into production ===
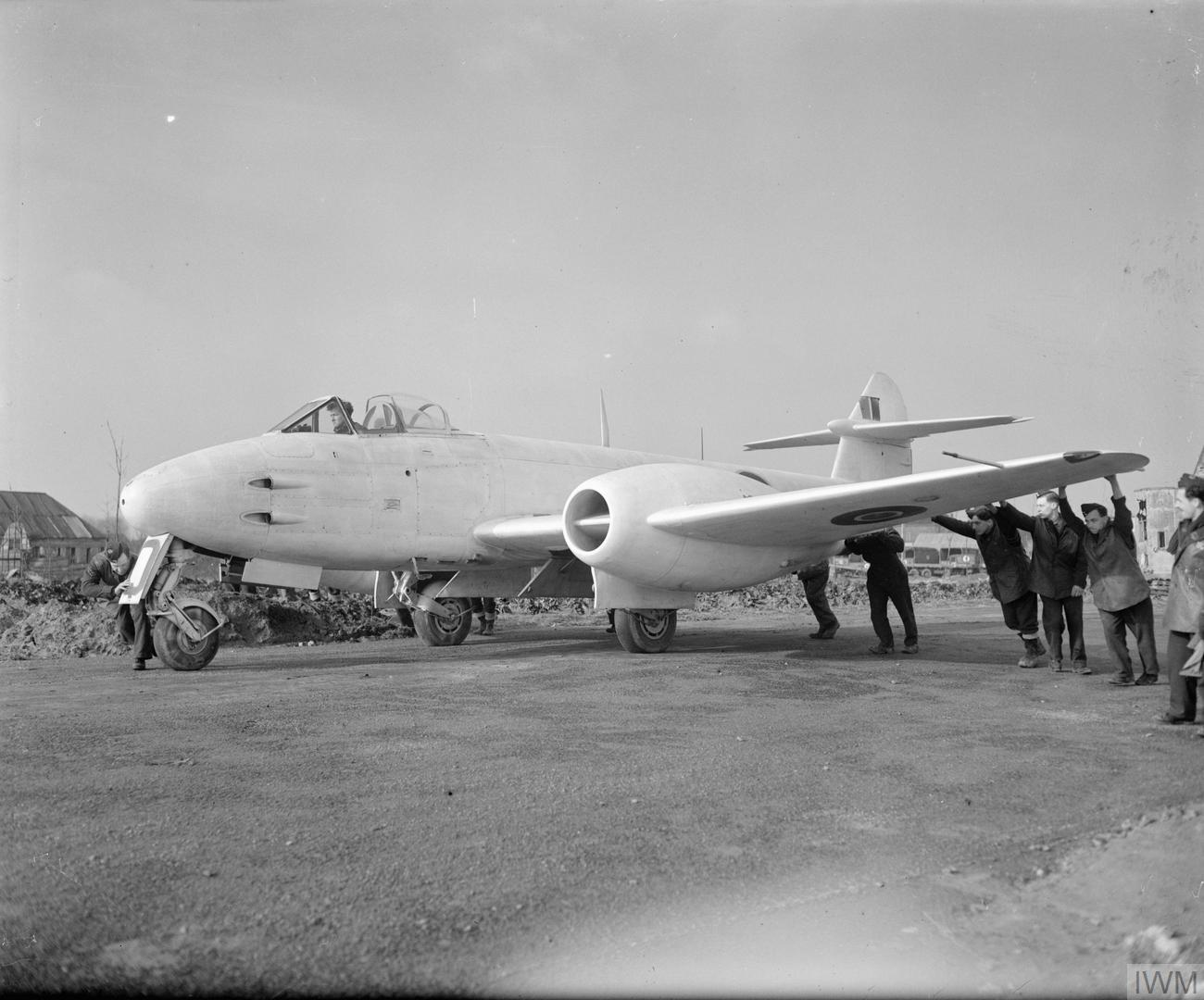
Meteor being deployed in March 1945

On 12 January 1944, the first Meteor F.1, serial EE210/G, took to the air from Moreton Valence in Gloucestershire. It was essentially identical to the F9/40 prototypes except for the addition of four nose-mounted 20 mm (.79 in) Hispano Mk V cannon and some changes to the canopy to improve all-round visibility. Due to the F.1's similarity to the prototypes, they were frequently operated in the test program to progress British understanding of jet propulsion, and it took until July 1944 for the aircraft to enter squadron service. EE210/G was later sent to the U.S. for evaluation in exchange for a pre-production Bell YP-59A Airacomet, the Meteor being flown first by John Grierson at Muroc Army Airfield on 15 April 1944.

Originally 300 F.1s were ordered, but the total produced was reduced to 20 aircraft as the follow-on orders had been converted to the more advanced models. Some of the last major refinements to the Meteor's early design were trialled using this first production batch, and what was to become the long-term design of the engine nacelles was introduced upon EE211. The original nacelles had been discovered by the RAE to suffer from compressibility buffeting at higher speeds, causing increased drag; the re-designed longer nacelles eliminated this and provided an increase in the Meteor's maximum speed. The lengthened nacelles were introduced on the final fifteen Meteor IIIs. EE215 was the first Meteor to be fitted with guns; EE215 was also used in engine reheat trials, the addition of reheat increasing top speed from 420 mph to 460 mph. It was later converted into the first two-seat Meteor. Due to the radical differences between jet-powered aircraft and those that it replaced, a special Tactical Flight or T-Flight unit was established to prepare the Meteor for squadron service, led by Group Captain Hugh Joseph Wilson. The Tactical Flight was formed at Farnborough in May 1944, the first Meteors arriving the following month, upon which both tactical applications and limitations were extensively explored.

On 17 July 1944, the Meteor F.1 was cleared for service use. Shortly afterwards, elements of the Tactical Flight and their aircraft were transferred to operational RAF squadrons. The first deliveries to No. 616 Squadron RAF, the first operational squadron to receive the Meteor, began in July 1944. When the F.2 was cancelled, the Meteor F.3 became the immediate successor to the F.1 and alleviated some of the shortcomings of the F.1. In August 1944, the first F.3 prototype flew; early F.3 production aircraft were still fitted with the Welland engine as the Derwent engine's production was just starting at this point. A total of 210 F.3 aircraft were produced before they were in turn superseded by production of the Meteor F.4 in 1945.

Several Meteor F.3s were converted into navalised aircraft. The adaptations included a strengthened undercarriage and arrester hook. Operational trials of the type took place aboard HMS Implacable. The trials included carrier landings and takeoffs. Performance of these naval prototype Meteors proved to be favourable, including takeoff performance, leading to further trials with a modified Meteor F.4 fitted with folding wings; a "clipped wing" was also adopted. The Meteor later entered service with the Royal Navy, but only as a land-based trainer, the Meteor T.7, to prepare pilots of the Fleet Air Arm for flying other jet aircraft such as the de Havilland Sea Vampire.

While various marks of Meteor had been introduced by 1948, they had remained very similar to the prototypes of the Meteor; consequently, the performance of the Meteor F.4 was beginning to be eclipsed by new jet designs. Gloster therefore embarked on a redesign programme to produce a new version of the Meteor with better performance. Designated Meteor F.8, this upgraded variant was a potent fighter aircraft, forming the bulk of RAF Fighter Command between 1950 and 1955. The Meteor continued to be operated in a military capacity by several nations into the 1960s.

=== Night fighter ===
To replace the increasingly obsolete de Havilland Mosquito as a night fighter, the Meteor was adapted to serve in the role as an interim aircraft. Gloster had initially proposed a night fighter design to meet the Air Ministry specification for the Mosquito replacement, based on the two seater trainer variant of the Meteor, with the pilot in the front seat and the navigator in the rear. Once accepted however, work on the project was swiftly transferred to Armstrong Whitworth to perform both the detailed design process and production of the type; the first prototype flew on 31 May 1950. Although based on the T.7 twin seater, it used the fuselage and tail of the F.8, and the longer wings of the F.3. An extended nose contained the AI Mk 10 (the 1940s Westinghouse SCR-720) Air Intercept radar. As a consequence the 20 mm cannons were moved into the wings, outboard of the engines. A ventral fuel tank and wing mounted drop tanks completed the Armstrong Whitworth Meteor NF.11.

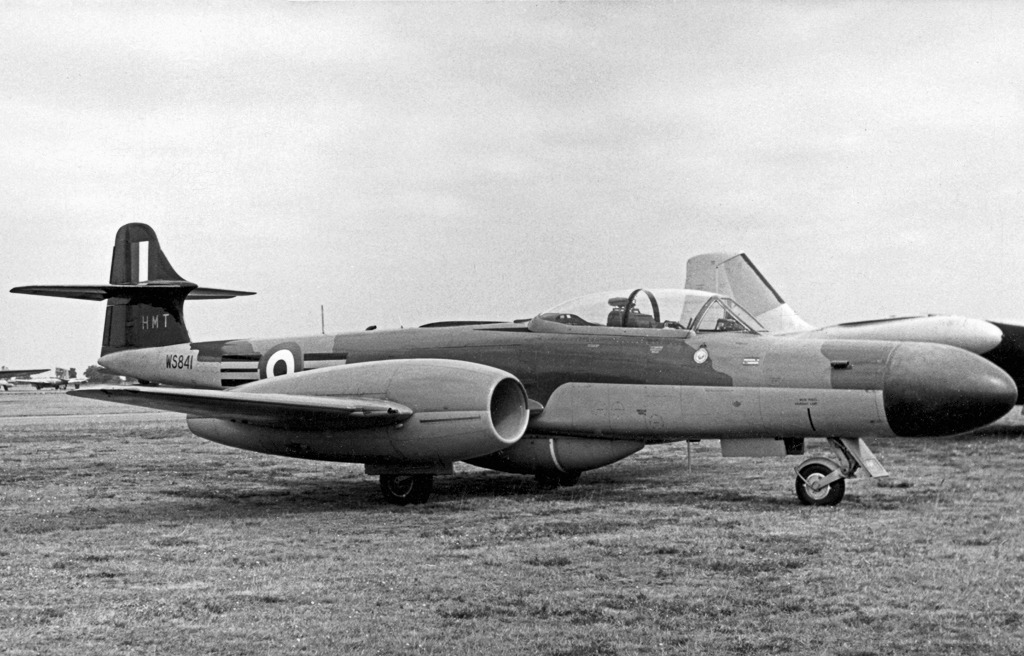
Operational Meteor NF.14 of No. 264 Squadron RAF in 1955

As radar technology developed, a new Meteor night fighter was developed to use the improved US-built APS-21 system. The NF.12 first flew on 21 April 1953. It was similar to the NF.11 but had a nose section 17 inches (43 cm) longer; the fin was enlarged to compensate for the greater keel area of the enlarged nose and to counter the airframe reaction to the sideways oscillating motion of the radar scanner which caused difficulty aiming the guns, an anti-tramp motor operating on the rudder was fitted midway up the front leading edge of the fin. The NF.12 also had the new Rolls-Royce Derwent 9 engines and the wings were reinforced to handle the new engine. Deliveries of the NF.12 started in 1953, with the type entering squadron service in early 1954, equipping seven squadrons (Nos 85, 25, 152, 46, 72, 153 and 64); the aircraft was replaced over 1958–1959.

The final Meteor night fighter was the NF.14. First flown on 23 October 1953, the NF.14 was based on the NF.12 but had an even longer nose, extended by a further 17 inches (430 mm) to accommodate new equipment, increasing the total length to 51 ft 4 in (15.65 m) and a larger bubble canopy to replace the framed T.7 version. Just 100 NF.14s were built; they first entered service in February 1954 beginning with No. 25 Squadron and were being replaced as early as 1956 by the Gloster Javelin. Overseas, they remained in service a little longer, serving with No. 60 Squadron at Tengah, Singapore until 1961. As the NF.14 was replaced, some 14 were converted to training aircraft as the NF(T).14 and given to No. 2 Air Navigation School on RAF Thorney Island until transferring to No. 1 Air Navigation School at RAF Stradishall where they served until 1965.

== Design ==
=== Overview ===
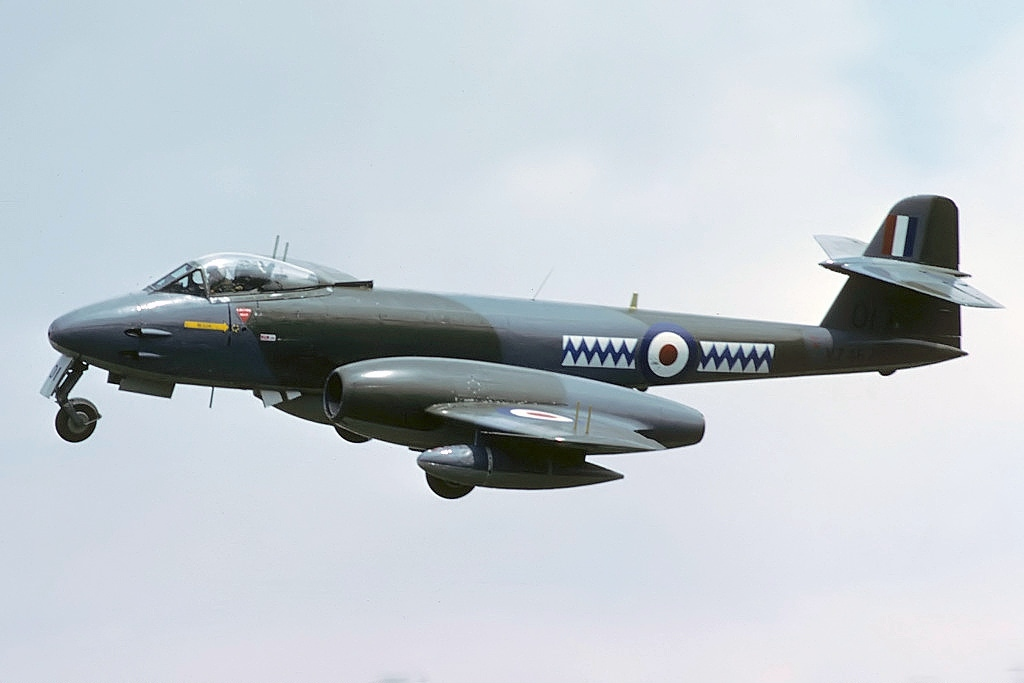
Meteor F.8 in flight at RAF Greenham Common, May 1986

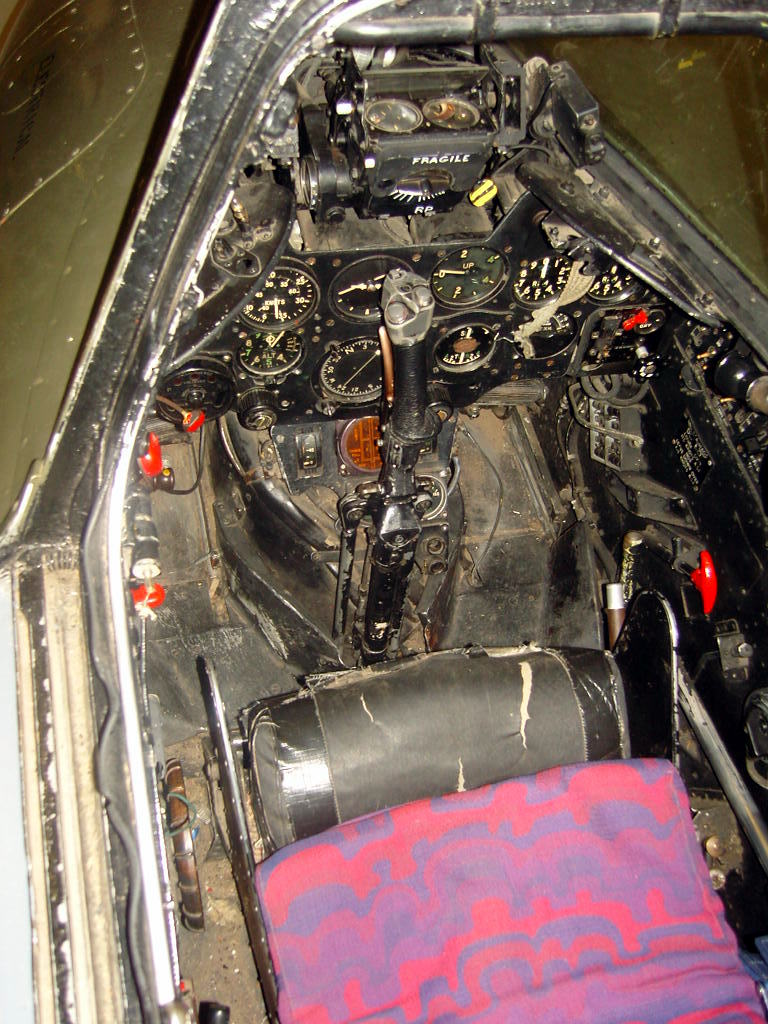
Meteor F.8 cockpit

The first operational version of the Meteor, designated as the Meteor F.1, apart from the minor airframe refinements, was a straightforward "militarisation" of the earlier F9/40 prototypes. The dimensions of the standard Meteor F.1 were 41 ft 3 in (12.57 m) long with a span of 43 ft 0 in (13.11 m), with an empty weight of 8,140 lb (3,690 kg) and a maximum takeoff weight of 13,795 lb (6,257 kg). Despite the revolutionary turbojet propulsion used, the design of the Meteor was relatively orthodox and did not take advantage of many aerodynamic features used on other, later jet fighters, such as swept wings; the Meteor shared a broadly similar basic configuration to its German equivalent, the Messerschmitt Me 262, which was also aerodynamically conventional.

It was an all-metal aircraft with a tricycle undercarriage and conventional low, straight wings with mid-mounted turbojet engines and a high-mounted tailplane clear of the jet exhaust. (Note: With no weight from propellers and the more rearward placement of the engines, the Meteor's centre of gravity was aft of the typical fighters of the era, thus leading to the adoption of the tricycle undercarriage arrangement.) (Note: While there had been concerns over the structural strength from the high tailplane position selected, Carter was aware of the instability risks that the jet exhaust could generate, so it was decided to mount the tailplane as high as possible on the fin.) The Meteor F.1 exhibited some problematic flying characteristics typical of early jet aircraft; it suffered from stability problems at high transonic speeds, large trim changes, high stick forces and self-sustained yaw instability (snaking) caused by airflow separation over the thick tail surfaces. The longer fuselage of the Meteor T.7, a two-seater trainer, significantly reduced the aerodynamic instability that the early Meteors were known for.

Later Meteor variants would see a large variety of changes from the initial Meteor F.1 introduced to service in 1944. Much attention was given to raising the aircraft's top speed, often by improving the airframe's aerodynamic qualities, incorporating the latest engine developments, and increasing the strength of the airframe. The Meteor F.8, which emerged in the late 1940s, was considered to have substantially improved performance over prior variants; the F.8 was reportedly the most powerful single-seat aircraft flying in 1947, capable of ascending to 40,000 feet (12,000 m) within five minutes.

=== Construction ===
From the outset, each Meteor was constructed from several modular sections or separately produced units, a deliberate design choice to allow for production to be dispersed and for easy disassembly for transport. Each aircraft comprised five main sections: nose, forward fuselage, central section, rear fuselage and tail units; the wings were also built out of lengthwise sections. The forward section contained the pressure cabin, gun compartments, and forward undercarriage. The centre section incorporated much of the structural elements, including the inner wing, engine nacelles, fuel tank, ammunition drums, and main undercarriage. The rear fuselage was of a conventional semi-monocoque structure. Various aluminium alloys were the primary materials used throughout the structure of the Meteor, such as the stressed duralumin skin.

Across the Meteor's production life, various different companies were subcontracted to manufacture aircraft sections and major components; due to the wartime workload on producing fighter aircraft such as the Hawker Hurricane and Hawker Typhoon, neither Gloster nor the wider Hawker Siddeley Group were able to internally meet the production demand of 80 aircraft per month. Bristol Tramways produced the forward fuselage of the aircraft, the Standard Motor Company manufactured the central fuselage and inner wing sections, the Pressed Steel Company produced the rear fuselage, and Parnall Aircraft made the tail unit. Other main subcontractors included Boulton Paul Aircraft, Excelsior Motor Radiator Company, Bell Punch, Turner Manufacturing Company, and Charlesworth Bodies; as many of these firms had little or no experience producing aircraft, both quality and interchangeability of components were maintained by contractually enforced adherence to Gloster's original drawings.

From the Meteor F.4 onwards, Armstrong Whitworth began completing whole units at their Coventry facility in addition to Gloster's own production line. Belgian aviation firm Avions Fairey also produced the Meteor F.8 under licence from Gloster for the Belgian Air Force; a similar licence manufacturing arrangement was made with Dutch company Fokker to meet the Royal Netherlands Air Force's order.

=== Engines ===
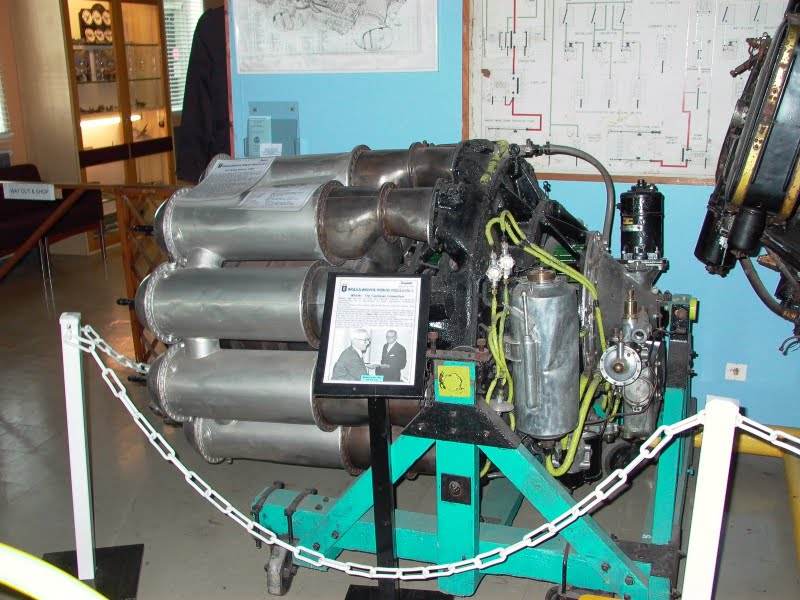
Rolls-Royce Welland engine on display. The rear of the engine is at the left.

The Meteor F.1 was powered by two Rolls-Royce Welland turbojet engines, Britain's first production jet engines, which were built under licence from Whittle's designs. The Meteor embodied the advent of practical jet propulsion; in the type's service life, both military and civil aviation manufacturers rapidly integrated turbine engines into their designs, favouring its advantages such as smoother running and greater power output. The Meteor's engines were considerably more practical than those of the German Me 262 as, unlike the Me 262, the engines were embedded into the wing in nacelles between the front and rear spars rather than underslung, saving some weight due to shorter landing gear legs and less massive spars. (Note: Carter had considered and rejected placing the engines within the fuselage or an underslung arrangement due to the issue of accessibility; having the engines underneath the wings would have imposed weight limitations by forcing longer undercarriage legs and a heavier spar structure to be adopted in turn.)

The W.2B/23C engines upon which the Welland was based produced 1,700 lbf (7.6 kN) of thrust each, giving the aircraft a maximum speed of 417 mph (671 km/h) at 9,800 feet (3,000 m) and a range of 1,000 miles (1,600 km). It incorporated a hydraulically driven engine starter developed by Rolls-Royce, which was automated following the press of a starter button in the cockpit. (Note: The F9/40 prototypes and some early production Meteors lacked the automatic starting system fitted on most aircraft, requiring a considerably more complicated procedure to be followed.) The engines also drove hydraulic and vacuum pumps as well as a generator via a Rotol gearbox fixed on the forward wing spar; the cockpit was also heated by bleed air from one of the engines. The acceleration rate of the engines was manually controlled by the pilot; rapid engine acceleration would frequently induce compressor stalls early on; the likelihood of compressor stalls was effectively eliminated upon further design refinements of both the Welland engine and the Meteor itself. At high speeds the Meteor had a tendency to lose directional stability, often during unfavourable weather conditions, leading to a "snaking" motion; this could be easily resolved by throttling back to reduce speed.

Based upon designs produced by Power Jets, Rolls-Royce produced more advanced and powerful turbojet engines. Beyond numerous improvements made to the Welland engine that powered the early Meteors, Rolls-Royce brought the Rover B.26, a radical re-design from the W.2B/500 under Adrian Lombard at Rover, into service as the Derwent. The Derwent engine, and the re-designed Derwent V, a scaled down version of the Nene, was installed on many of the later production Meteors; the adoption of this new powerplant led to considerable performance increases. (Note: The confidence of Rolls-Royce's engineers in the performance of the Derwent 5 engines led to the engine proceeding to production straight from the drawing board, in advance of any practice testing.) The Meteor often served as the basis for the development of other early turbojet designs; a pair of Meteor F.4s were sent to Rolls-Royce to aid in their experimental engine trials, RA435 being used for reheat testing, and RA491 being fitted with the Rolls-Royce Avon, an axial-flow engine. From their involvement in the development of the Meteor's engines, Armstrong-Siddeley, Bristol Aircraft, Metropolitan-Vickers and de Havilland also independently developed their own gas turbine engines.

=== Performance ===
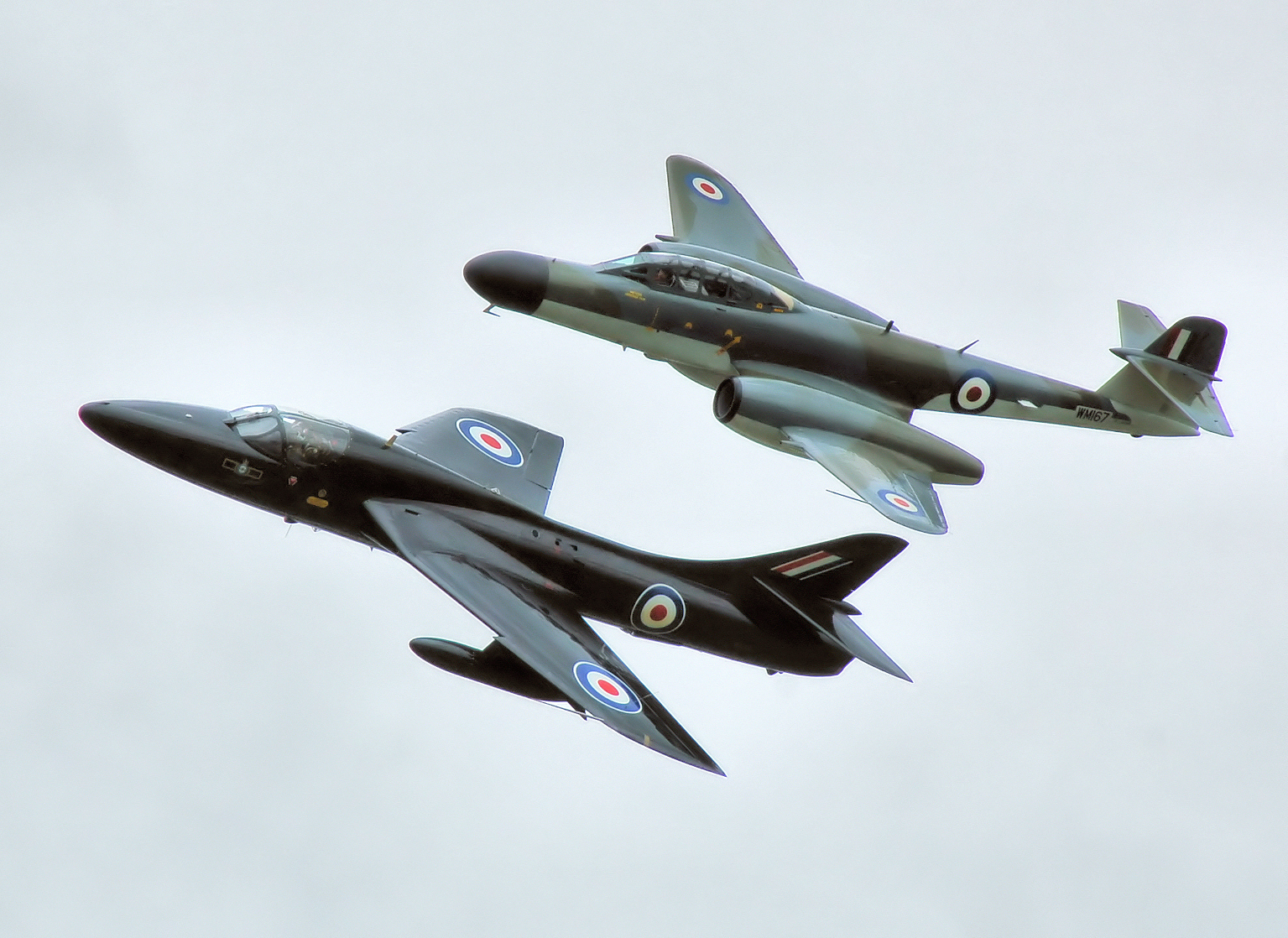
Meteor NF.11 (right) flying with a Hawker Hunter T7A at the Cotswold Air Show in 2009

During development, sceptical elements of the Air Ministry had expected mature piston-powered aircraft types to exceed the capabilities of the Meteor in all respects except that of speed; thus, the performance of early Meteors was considered favourable for the interceptor mission, being capable of out-diving the majority of enemy aircraft. The conclusion of in-service trials conducted between the Meteor F.3. and the Hawker Tempest V was that the performance of the Meteor exceeded the Tempest in almost all respects and that, barring some manoeuvrability issues, the Meteor could be considered a capable all-round fighter. Pilots formerly flying piston-engine aircraft often described the Meteor as being exciting to fly. British politician Norman Tebbit stated of his experience flying the Meteor in the RAF: "Get airborne, up with the wheels, hold it low until you were about 380 knots, pull it up and she would go up, well we thought then, like a rocket".

Early jet engines consumed a lot more fuel than the piston engines they replaced so the Welland engines imposed considerable flight-time limitations on the Meteor F.1, leading to the type being used for local interception duties only. In the post-war environment, there was considerable pressure to increase the range of interceptors to counter the threat of bombers armed with nuclear weapons. The long-term answer to this question was in-flight refuelling; several Meteors were provided to Flight Refuelling Limited for trials of the newly developed probe-and-drogue refuelling techniques. This capability was not incorporated in service Meteors, which had already been supplanted by more modern interceptor aircraft at this point.

A total of 890 Meteors were lost in RAF service (145 of these crashes occurring in 1953 alone), resulting in the deaths of 450 pilots. Contributory factors in the number of crashes were the poor brakes, failure of the landing gear, the high fuel consumption and consequent short flight endurance (less than one hour) causing pilots to run out of fuel, and difficult handling with one engine out due to the widely set engines. The casualty rate was exacerbated by the lack of ejection seats in early series Meteors; the much higher speed that the aircraft was capable of meant that to bail out pilots might have to overcome high g forces and fast-moving airflow past the cockpit; there was also a greater likelihood of the pilot striking the horizontal tailplane. Ejection seats were fitted in the later F.8, FR.9, PR.10 and some experimental Meteors. The difficulty of bailing out of the Meteor had been noted by pilots during development, reporting several contributing design factors such as the limited size and relative position of the cockpit to the rest of the aircraft, and difficulty in using the two-lever jettisonable hood mechanism.

== Operational service ==
=== Second World War ===
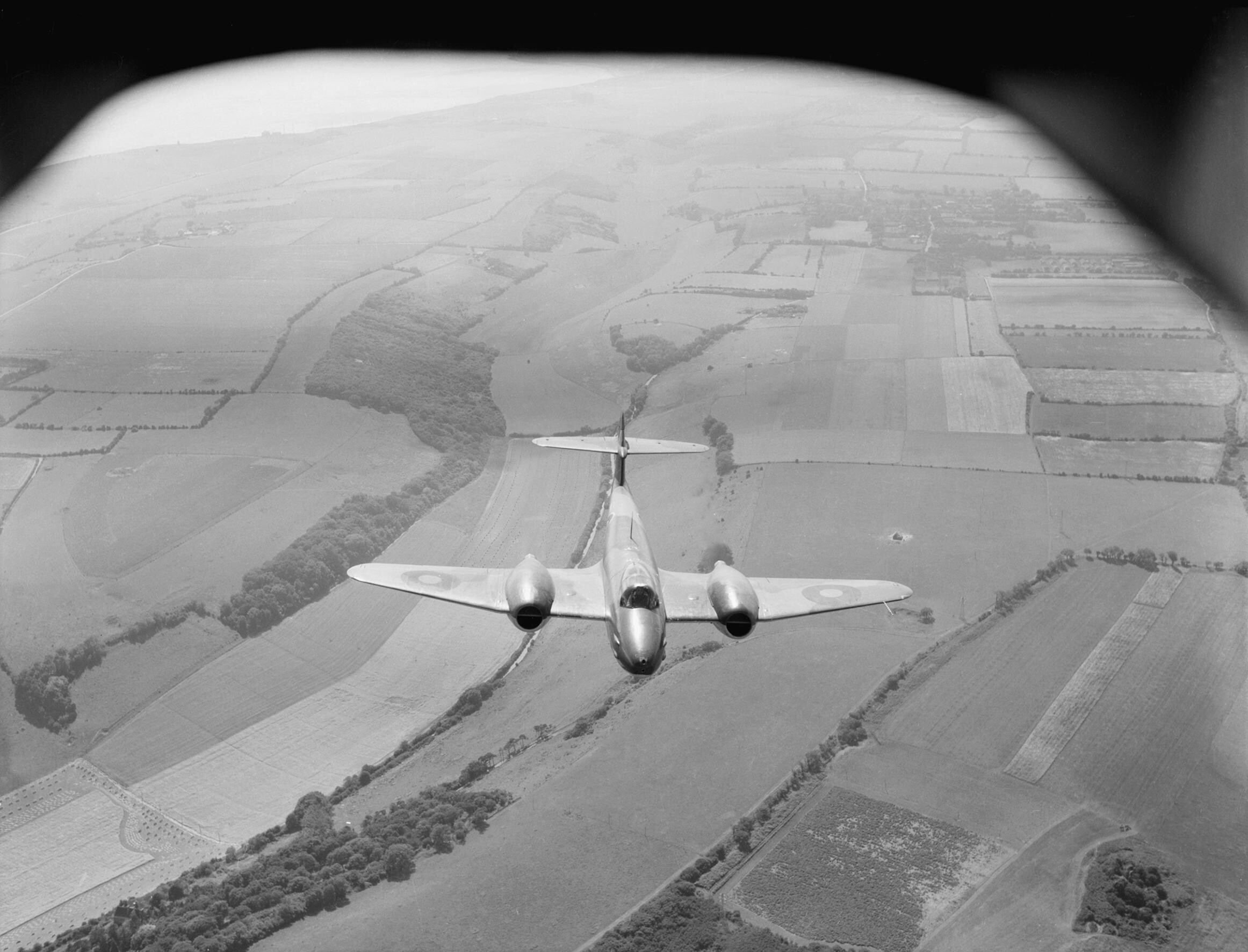
Meteor F.1 of No. 616 Squadron

No. 616 Squadron RAF was the first to receive operational Meteors: a total of 14 aircraft were initially delivered. The squadron was based at RAF Culmhead, Somerset and had been equipped with the Spitfire VII. The conversion to the Meteor was initially a matter of great secrecy. Following a conversion course at Farnborough attended by the squadron's six leading pilots, the first aircraft was delivered to Culmhead on 12 July 1944. (Note: Aviation author Edward Shacklady noted that pilot conversion was "surprisingly easy", and that the main problem encountered during training was often becoming accustomed to the Meteor's tricycle undercarriage.) The squadron and its seven Meteors moved on 21 July 1944 to RAF Manston on the east Kent coast and, within a week, 32 pilots had been converted to the type.

The Meteor was initially used to counter the V-1 flying bomb threat. 616 Squadron Meteors saw action for the first time on 27 July 1944, when three aircraft were active over Kent. These were the first operational jet combat missions for the Meteor and for the RAF. After some problems, especially with jamming guns, the first two V-1 "kills" were made on 4 August. By war's end, Meteors had accounted for 14 flying bombs. After the end of the V-1 threat, and the introduction of the ballistic V-2 rocket, the RAF was forbidden to fly the Meteor on combat missions over German-held territory for fear of an aircraft being shot down and salvaged by the Germans.

No. 616 Squadron briefly moved to RAF Debden to allow United States Army Air Forces (USAAF) bomber crews to gain experience and create tactics in facing jet-engined foes before moving to Colerne, Wiltshire. For a week from 10 October 1944 a series of exercises were carried out in which a flight of Meteors made mock attacks on a formation of 100 B-24s and B-17s escorted by 40 Mustangs and Thunderbolts. These suggested that, if the jet fighter attacked the formation from above, it could take advantage of its superior speed in the dive to attack the bombers and then escape by diving through the formation before the escorts could react. The best tactic to counter this was to place a fighter screen 5,000 feet (1,500 m) above the bombers and attempt to intercept the jets early in the dive. The exercise was also useful from No. 616 Squadron's perspective, giving valuable practical experience in Meteor operations.

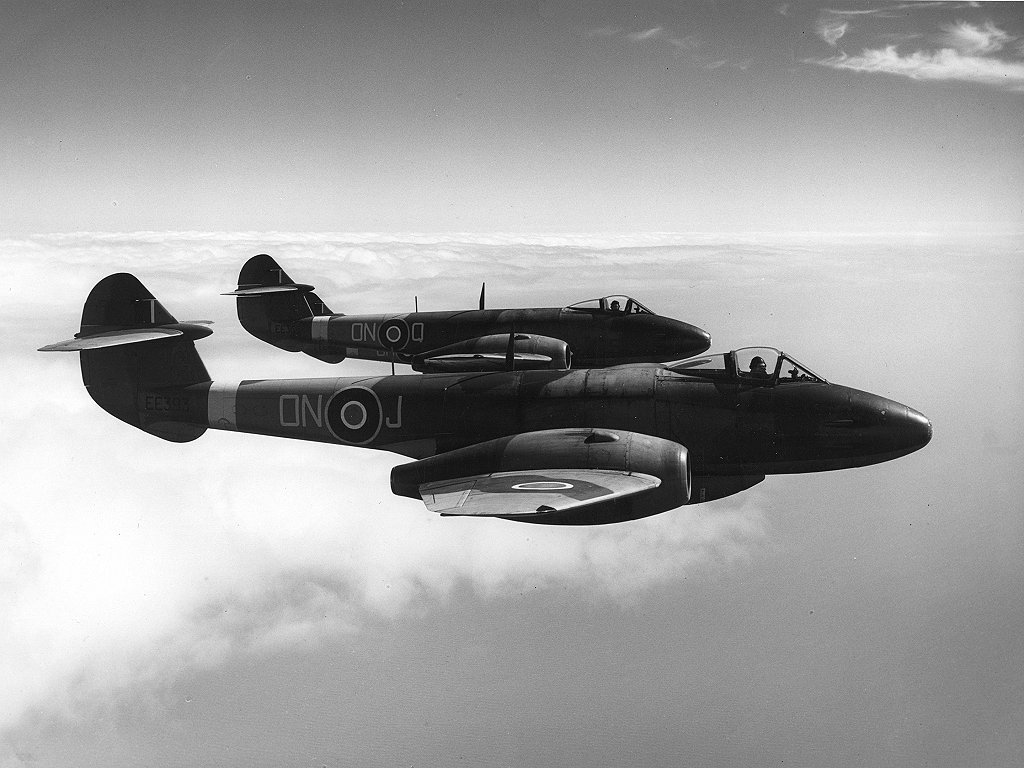
Meteor F.3s with original short engine nacelles

No. 616 Squadron exchanged its F.1s for the first Meteor F.3s on 18 December 1944. These first 15 F.3s differed from the F.1 in having a sliding canopy in place of the sideways hinging canopy, increased fuel capacity and some airframe refinements. They were still powered by Welland I engines. Later F.3s were equipped with the Derwent I engines. This was a substantial improvement over the earlier mark, although the basic design still had not reached its potential. Wind tunnel and flight tests demonstrated that the original short nacelles, which did not extend far fore and aft of the wing, contributed heavily to compressibility buffeting at high speed. New, longer nacelles not only cured some of the compressibility problems but added 75 miles per hour (120 km/h) at altitude, even without upgraded powerplants. The last batch of Meteor F.3s featured the longer nacelles; other F.3s were retrofitted in the field with the new nacelles. The F.3 also had the new Rolls-Royce Derwent engines, increased fuel capacity and a new larger, more strongly raked bubble canopy.

Judging the Meteor F.3s were ready for combat over Europe, the RAF finally decided to deploy them on the continent. On 20 January 1945, four Meteors from 616 Squadron were moved to Melsbroek in Belgium and attached to the Second Tactical Air Force, just under three weeks after the Luftwaffe's surprise Unternehmen Bodenplatte attack on New Year's Day, in which Melsbroek's RAF base, designated as Allied Advanced Landing Ground "B.58", had been struck by piston-engined fighters of JG 27 and JG 54. The 616 Squadron Meteor F.3s' initial purpose was to provide air defence for the airfield, but their pilots hoped that their presence might provoke the Luftwaffe into sending Me 262 jets against them. At this point the Meteor pilots were still forbidden to fly over German-occupied territory, or to go east of Eindhoven, to prevent a downed aircraft being captured by the Germans or the Soviets.

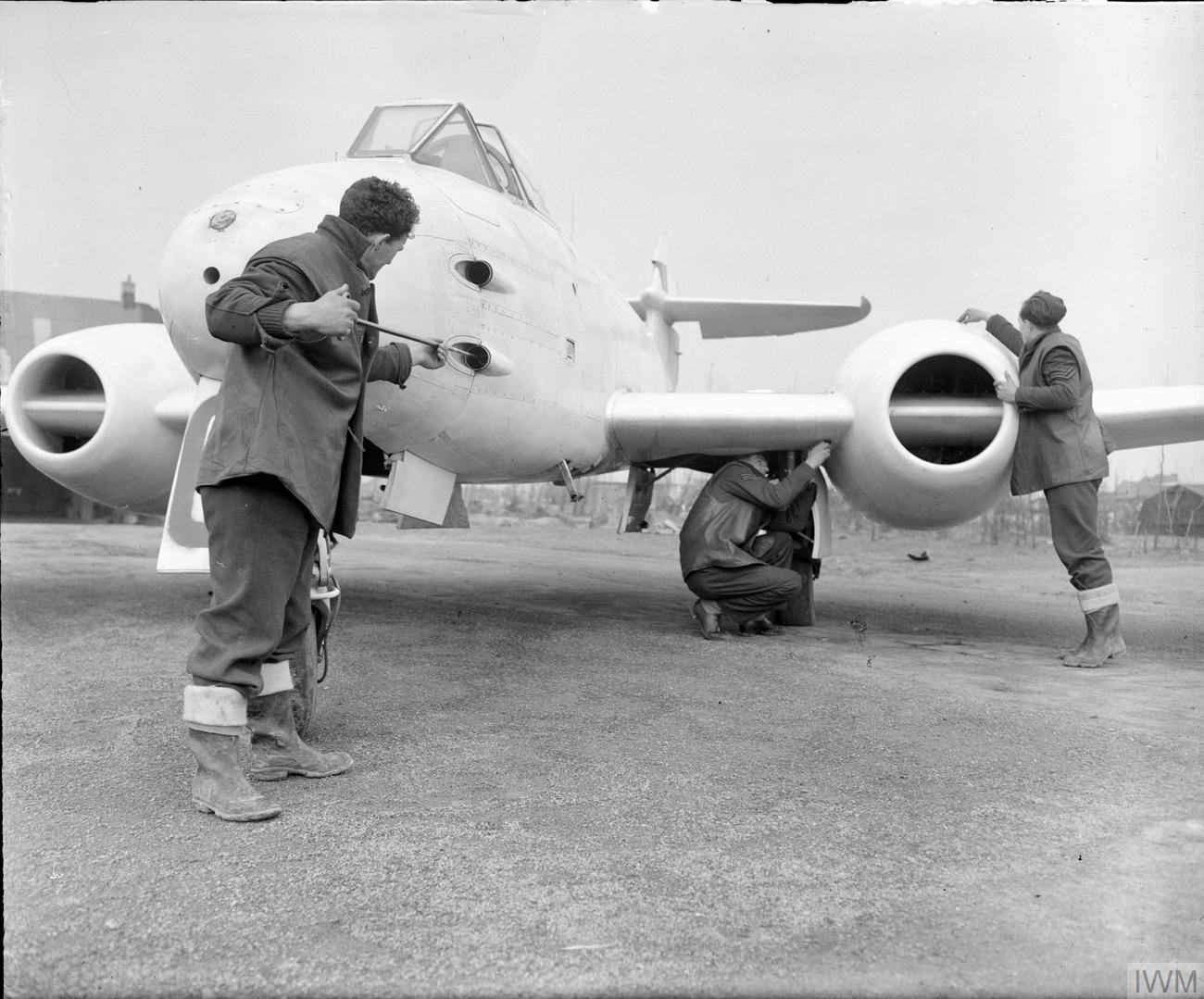
Ground crew servicing a Meteor of 616 Squadron at Melsbroek, Belgium, 1945. The all-white finish used by the four F.3s sent to Belgium was to aid recognition by ground troops during familiarisation training before the operational F.3 aircraft arrived

In March, the entire squadron was moved to Gilze-Rijen Air Base and then in April, to Nijmegen. The Meteors flew armed reconnaissance and ground attack operations without encountering any German jet fighters. By late April, the squadron was based at Faßberg, Germany and suffered its first losses when two aircraft collided in poor visibility. The war ended with the Meteors having destroyed 46 German aircraft through ground attack. Friendly fire through misidentification as Messerschmitt Me 262s by Allied anti-aircraft gunners was more of a threat than the already-diminished forces of the Luftwaffe; to counter this, continental-based Meteors were given an all-white finish as a recognition aid.

=== Post-war ===
The next-generation Meteor F.4 prototype first flew on 17 May 1945, and went into production in 1946 when 16 RAF squadrons were already operating Meteors. Equipped with Rolls-Royce Derwent 5 engines, the smaller version of the Nene, the F.4 was 170 mph (270 km/h) faster than the F.1 at sea level (585 against 415), but the reduced wings impaired its rate of climb. (Note: Extra stresses imposed by the 111 mph airspeed increase of the F.4 over the preceding F.3 were mainly being absorbed by the Meteor's wings. Rather than extensive redesign the wings to strengthen them, the designers shortened them. This reduced stress and improved the roll rate, but increased takeoff and landing speeds and reduced rate of climb and ceiling.) The F.4 wingspan was 86.4 cm shorter than the F.3 and with blunter wing tips, derived from the world speed record prototypes. Improvements included a strengthened airframe, fully pressurised cockpit, lighter ailerons to improve manoeuvrability, and rudder trim adjustments to reduce snaking. The F.4 could be fitted with a drop tank under each wing, and experiments were carried out with carriage of underwing stores and also in lengthened fuselage models.

Because of increased demand, F.4 production was divided between Gloster and Armstrong Whitworth. The majority of early F.4s did not go to the RAF: 100 were exported to Argentina, seeing action on both sides in the 1955 revolution; in 1947, only RAF Nos. 74 and 222 squadrons were fully equipped with the F.4. Nine further RAF squadrons converted from 1948 onwards. From 1948, 38 F.4s were exported to the Dutch, equipping four squadrons (322, 323, 326 and 327) split between bases in Soesterberg and Leeuwarden until the mid-1950s. In 1949, only two RAF squadrons were converted to the F.4, Belgium was sold 48 aircraft in the same year (going to 349 and 350 squadrons at Beauvechain) and Denmark received 20 over 1949–1950. In 1950, three more RAF squadrons were upgraded, including No. 616 and, in 1951, six more.

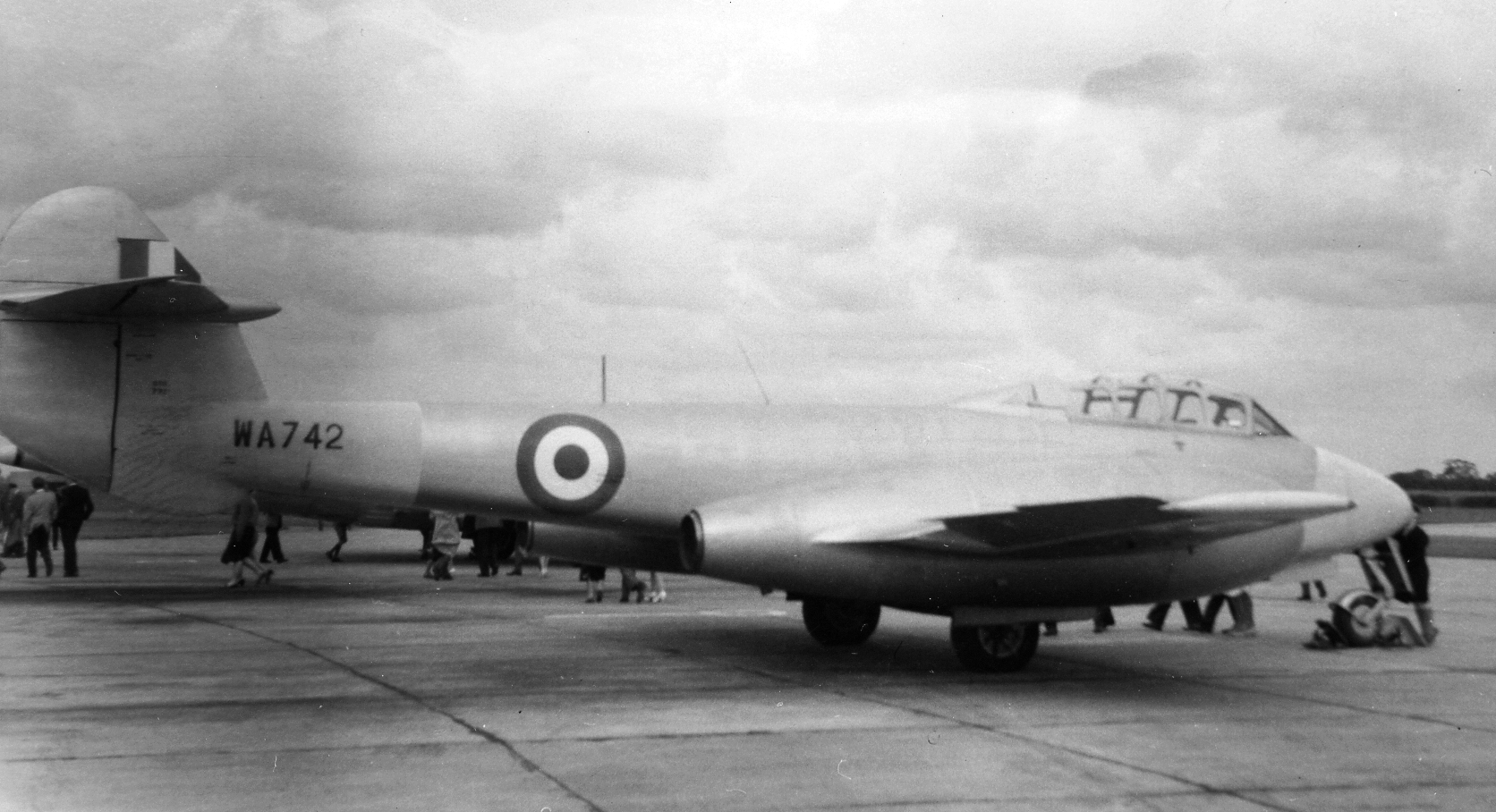
WA742, a two-seat Meteor T.7 in 1961

A modified two-seater F.4 for jet-conversion and advanced training was tested in 1949 as the T.7. It was accepted by the RAF and the Fleet Air Arm and became a common addition to the various export packages (for example 43 to Belgium between 1948 and 1957, a similar number to the Netherlands over the same period, two to Syria in 1952, six to Israel in 1953, etc.). Despite its limitations – unpressurised cockpit, no armament, limited instructor instrumentation – more than 650 T.7s were manufactured. The T.7 remained in RAF service into the 1970s.

As improved jet fighters emerged, Gloster decided to modernise the F.4 while retaining as much of the manufacturing tooling as possible. The result was the definitive production model, the Meteor F.8 (G-41-K), serving as a major RAF fighter until the introduction of the Hawker Hunter and the Supermarine Swift. The first prototype F.8 was a modified F.4, followed by a true prototype, VT150, that flew on 12 October 1948 at Moreton Valence. Flight testing of the F.8 prototype led to the discovery of an aerodynamic problem: after ammunition was expended, the aircraft became tail-heavy and unstable around the pitch axis due to the weight of fuel in fuselage tanks no longer being balanced by the ammunition. Gloster solved the problem by substituting the tail of the abortive G 42 single-engined jet fighter. The F.8 and other production variants successfully used the new tail design, giving the later Meteors a distinctive appearance, with taller straighter edges compared with the rounded tail of the F.4s and earlier marks.

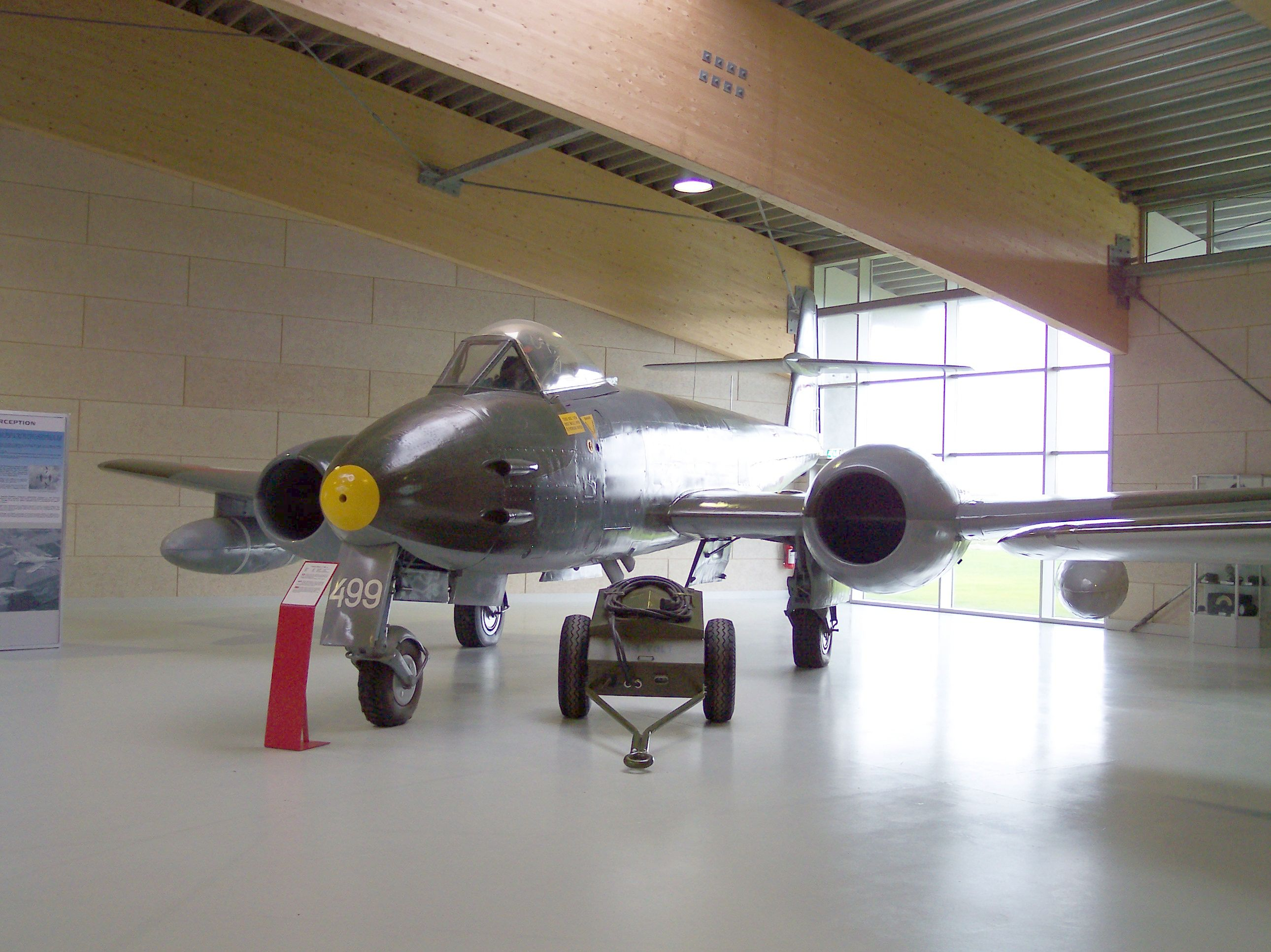
Meteor F.8 at the Danish Flight Museum, 2006

The F.8 also featured a fuselage stretch of 76 cm (30 in), intended to shift the aircraft's centre of gravity and also eliminate the use of ballast formerly necessary in earlier marks due to the subsequent elimination from the design of two of the originally designed six installed cannon. The F.8 incorporated uprated engines, Derwent 8s, with 3,600 lbf (16 kN) thrust each combined with structural strengthening, a Martin-Baker ejection seat and a "blown" teardrop cockpit canopy that provided improved pilot visibility.

Between 1950 and 1955, the Meteor F.8 was the mainstay of RAF Fighter Command, and served with distinction in combat in Korea with the RAAF as well as operating with many air forces worldwide, although it was clear that the original design was obsolete compared with contemporary swept-wing fighters such as the North American F-86 Sabre and the Soviet MiG-15. The last Meteor F.8 left RAF frontline squadrons in 1957. Several F.8 were used for target towing or as aggressor until 1970.

Initial deliveries of the F.8 to the RAF were in August 1949, with the first squadron receiving its fighters in late 1950. Like the F.4, there were strong export sales of the F.8. Belgium ordered 240 aircraft, the majority assembled in The Netherlands by Fokker. The Netherlands had 160 F.8s, equipping seven squadrons until 1955. Denmark had 20, ordered in 1951, the last F.8s in front-line service in Europe. The RAAF ordered 94 F.8s, which served in the Korean War. Despite arms embargoes, both Syria and Egypt received F.8s from 1952, as did Israel, each using their Meteors during the Suez Crisis. Brazil ordered 60 new Meteor F.8s and 10 T.7 trainers in October 1952, paying with 15,000 tons of raw cotton.

In the 1950s, Meteors were developed into effective photo-reconnaissance, training and night fighter versions. The fighter reconnaissance (FR) versions were the first to be built, replacing the ageing Spitfires and Mosquitos then in use. Two FR.5s were built on the F.4 body; one was used for nose section camera tests, the other broke up in midair while in testing over Moreton Valence. On 23 March 1950, the first FR.9 flew. Based on the F.8, it was 20 cm longer with a new nose incorporating a remote control camera and window and was also fitted with additional external ventral and wing fuel tanks. Production of the FR.9 began in July. No. 208 Squadron, then based at Fayid, Egypt was the first to be upgraded followed by the 2nd Tactical Air Force in West Germany, No. 2 Squadron RAF at Bückeburg and No. 79 Squadron RAF at RAF Gutersloh flew the FR.9 from 1951 until 1956. In Aden, No. 8 Squadron RAF was given FR.9s in November 1958 and used them until 1961. Ecuador (12), Israel (7) and Syria (2) were foreign customers for the FR.9.

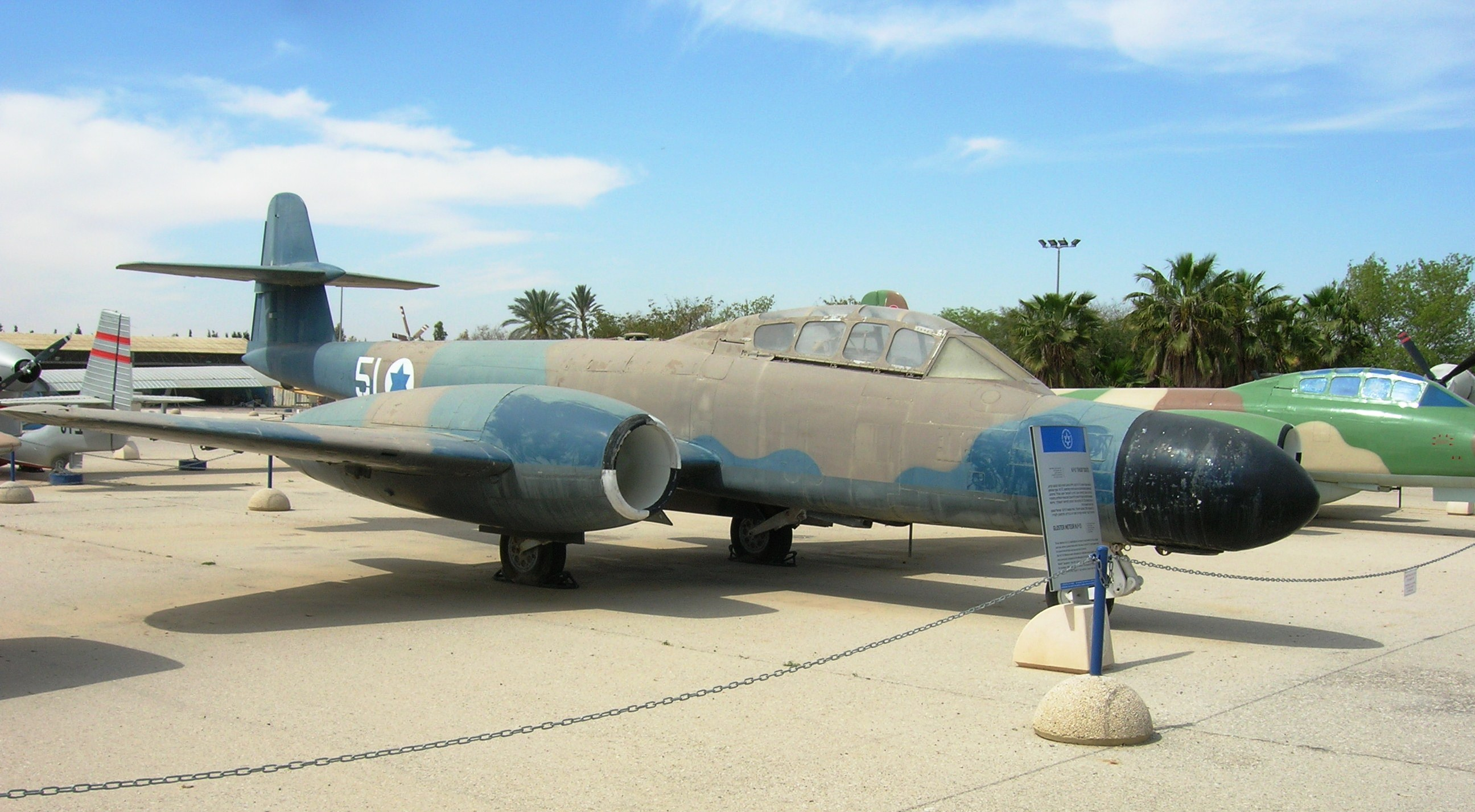
A Meteor NF.13 of the Israeli Air Force at the IAF Museum in 2007

In 1951, 29, 141, 85 and 264 squadrons each received a number of NF.11 aircraft, the first of the Meteor night fighters. It was rolled out across the RAF until the final deliveries in 1954. A "tropicalised" version of the NF.11 for the Middle East was developed; first flying on 23 December 1952 as the NF.13. The aircraft equipped No. 219 Squadron RAF at Kabrit and No. 39 Squadron at Fayid, both in Egypt. The aircraft served during the Suez crisis and remained with No. 39 Squadron after they were withdrawn to Malta until 1958. Several problems were encountered: the heavily framed T.7 canopy made landings tricky due to limited visibility, the under-wing external fuel tanks tended to break up when the wing cannons were fired, and gun harmonisation, normally set to about 400 yards, was poor due to the wings flexing in flight. Belgium (24), Denmark (20) and France (41) were foreign customers for the NF.11. Ex-RAF NF.13s were sold to France (two), Syria (six), Egypt (six) and Israel (six).

In addition to the armed, low altitude operation, tactical FR.9 variant, Gloster also developed the PR.10 for high altitude missions. The first prototype flew on 29 March 1950 and was actually converted into the first production aircraft. Based on the F.4, it had the F.4-style tail and the longer wings of the earlier variant. All the cannons were removed and a single camera placed in the nose with two more in the rear fuselage; the canopy was also changed. The PR.10 was delivered to the RAF in December 1950 and were given to No. 2 and No. 541 squadrons in Germany and No. 13 Squadron RAF in Cyprus. The PR.10 was rapidly phased out from 1956; rapid improvements in surface-to-air missile technology and the introduction of newer aircraft capable of flying at greater altitudes and speeds had rendered the aircraft obsolete.

=== Argentina ===
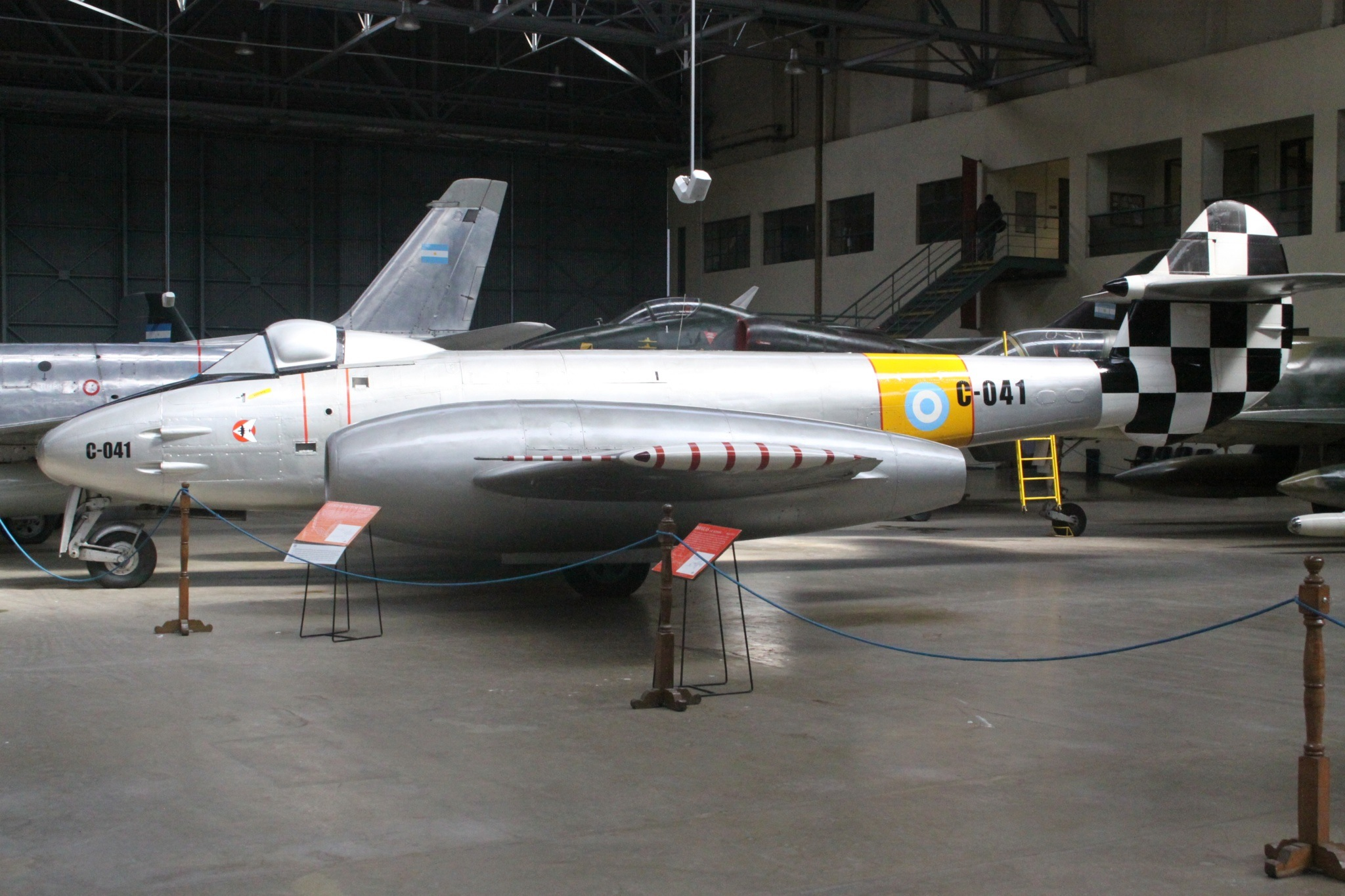
Meteor C-041 at Museo Nacional de Aeronáutica de Argentina, 2012

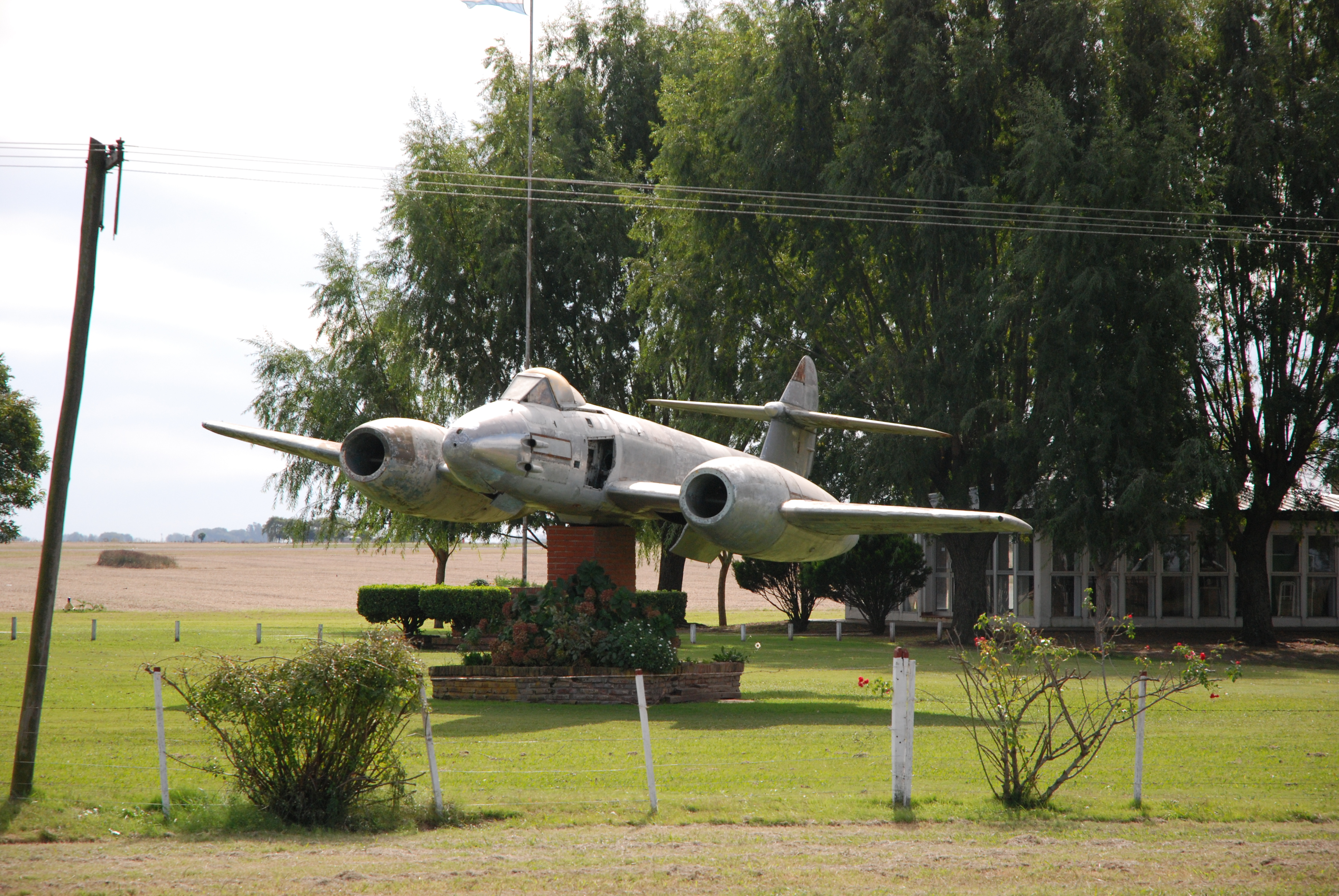
Meteor C-038 near to Junín Airport, 2010

Argentina became the first overseas operator of the Meteor, placing an order for 100 F Mk.4s in May 1947. The Meteor's procurement led to Argentina becoming the second air force in the Americas to operate jet aircraft.

The Argentine Meteors were first used in combat during the 16 June 1955 rebellion when, in an attempt to kill Juan Perón, rebel-flown aircraft bombed the Casa Rosada. A loyalist Meteor (I-063) piloted by E.J Adradas of the 7th Squadron shot down a rebel AT-6A (0340/A-3-9) piloted by A. Roman, while another meteor strafed rebel-held Ezeiza airport. The rebels seized Morón Airport and Air Base, base of the Meteors, and used several captured aircraft to perform multiple attacks against loyalist forces and the Casa Rosada before the rebellion was defeated by day's end.

A second revolt, the Revolución Libertadora, broke out on 16 September 1955, with, again, both sides operating the Meteor. The rebels seized three Meteors. Government Meteors flew strafing attacks against the rebel-held destroyers Rioja and Cervantes, and several landing ships near Rio Santiago on 16 September and attacking Pajas Blancas airport near the city of Córdoba, damaging several Avro Lincoln bombers. The rebel-flown Meteors were used to attack loyalist forces attacking Córdoba, losing one of their number on 19 September to an engine failure caused by use of automobile petrol instead of jet fuel.

The acquisition of F-86 Sabres in 1960 allowed the remaining Meteors to be transferred to the ground attack role. In this role, the aircraft were refitted with bomb pylons and rocket rails; the bare metal colour scheme was also discarded for a camouflage scheme.

Argentine Meteors were used to attack rebels during attempted uprisings in September 1962 and April 1963. The type was ultimately withdrawn from service in 1970.

=== Australia ===
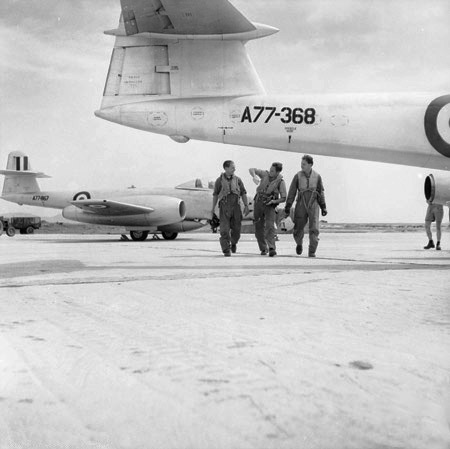
No. 77 Squadron RAAF pilots and Meteor aircraft in Korea, c. 1952.

The Royal Australian Air Force (RAAF) acquired 113 Meteors between 1946 and 1952, 94 of which were the F.8 variant. The first RAAF Meteor was an F.3 delivered for evaluation in June 1946. (Note: Upon the announcement of Australia's decision to procure the Meteor F.8 in 1950, Australian prime minister Robert Menzies stated: "The Meteor is regarded as the most modern type of jet fighter now available and will give a striking power, speed, and manoeuvrability of a kind to add enormously to our air strength.)

Australia's F.8s saw extensive service during the Korean War with No. 77 Squadron RAAF, part of British Commonwealth Forces Korea. The squadron had personnel from the RAF and other Commonwealth air forces attached to it. It had arrived in Korea equipped with piston-engined Mustangs. To match the threat posed by MiG-15 jet fighters, it was decided to reequip the squadron with Meteors. Jet conversion training was conducted at Iwakuni, Japan, after which the squadron returned to the Korean theatre in April 1951 with about 30 Meteor F.8s and T.7s. The squadron moved to Kimpo Air Base in June, and was declared combat ready the following month. More advanced designs, such as the F-86 Sabre and Hawker P.1081, were considered but would not be available within a realistic time frame; the Meteor proved to be considerably inferior in combat against the MiG-15 in several respects, including speed and manoeuvrability at high altitude.

On 29 July 1951, 77 Squadron began operating their Meteors on combat missions. The squadron had mainly been trained for ground attack and had difficulty when assigned to bomber escort duty at sub-optimum altitudes. On 29 August 1951, eight Meteors were on escort duty in "MiG Alley" when they were engaged by six MiG-15s; one Meteor was lost and two were damaged. (Note: According to anecdotal accounts, Warrant Officer Ron Guthrie destroyed a MiG-15 in this engagement. He was shot down during the dogfight and captured by ground forces. During his interrogation, two Soviet pilots told Guthrie, through an interpreter, that he had downed a MiG-15. He survived internment and was released on 3 September 1953.) On 27 October, the squadron achieved its first probable followed by two probables six days later. On 1 December the Battle of Sunchon took place between 14 Meteors and at least 20 MiG-15s – in North Korean markings but operated secretly by the elite Soviet 176th Guards Fighter Aviation Regiment (176 GIAP). The Australians lost three Meteors, with one pilot killed and two captured, while claiming one MiG destroyed and one damaged. Russian records and accounts, which became public after the end of the Cold War, suggested that no MiGs from 176 GIAP were lost.

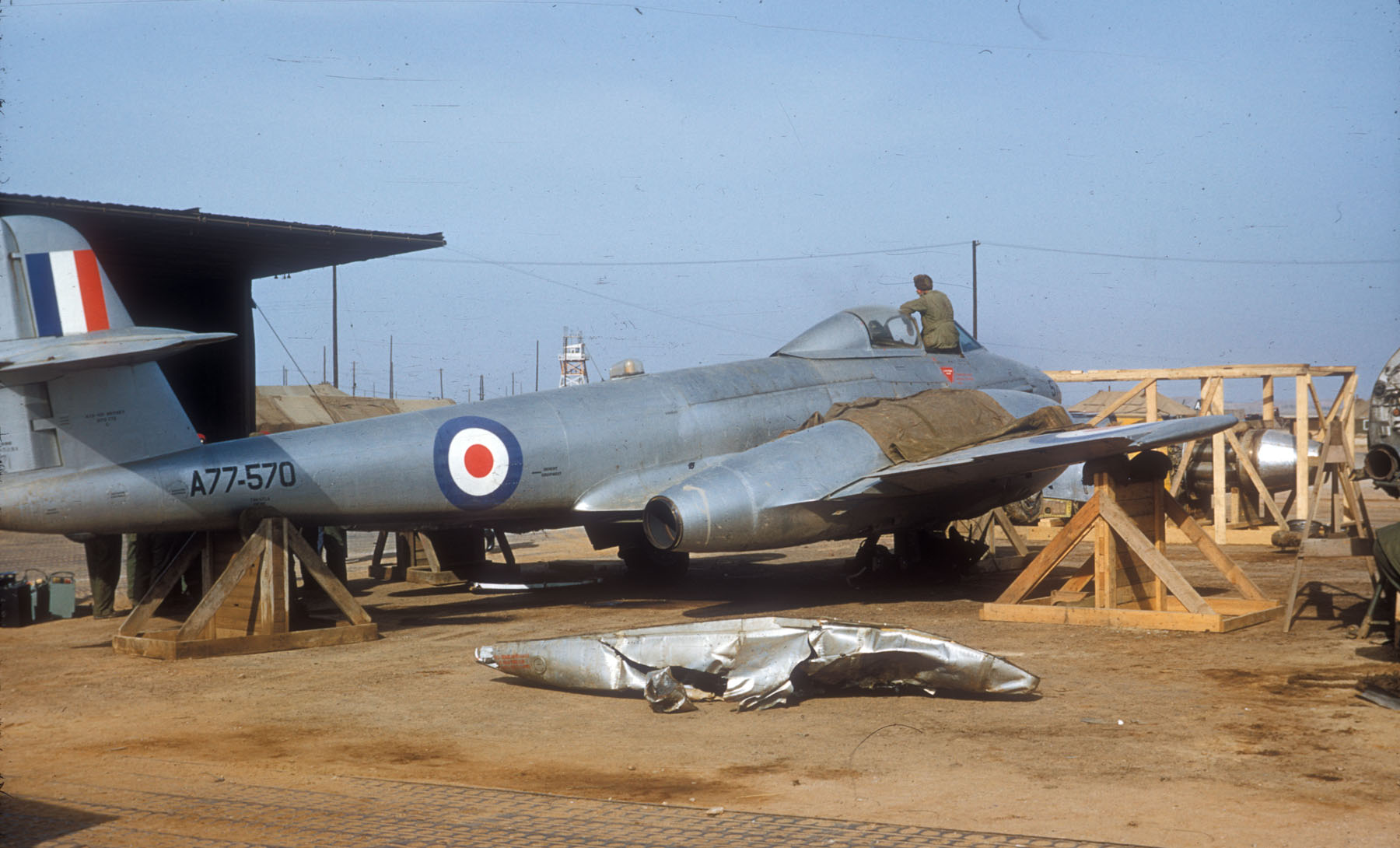
RAAF Meteor F.8 A-77-570 undergoing maintenance at Kimpo air base (K-14) during the Korean War.

At the end of 1951, due to the superiority of the MiGs in air combat – as well as the Meteor's favourable low-level performance and sturdy construction, RAAF commanders had 77 Squadron returned to ground-attack. In February 1952, more than a thousand ground-attack sorties were flown and these continued until May 1952, when 77 Squadron switched to fighter sweeps. The last encounter between the Meteor and the MiG-15 was in March 1953, during which a Meteor piloted by Sergeant John Hale recorded a victory. By the end of the conflict, the squadron had flown 4,836 missions, destroying six MiG-15s, over 3,500 structures and some 1,500 vehicles. About 30 Meteors were lost to enemy action in Korea, the vast majority shot down by anti-aircraft fire on ground-attack operations.

The RAAF began introducing the locally-built CAC Sabre powered by the Rolls-Royce Avon, in 1955, which relegated Meteors to training and secondary duties. A number of Meteors would be assigned to the reserve Citizen Air Force, while others were configured as pilotless drone aircraft or for target towing. No. 75 Squadron RAAF was the last Australian squadron to operate the Meteor; notably, it had operated a three-unit aerobatic team, named "The Meteorites".

=== Egypt ===
Although Egypt's first order for the Meteor was placed in 1948, the rising tension in the region led to the imposition of a series of arms embargoes. Twelve F Mk.4s were eventually delivered between October 1949 and May 1950, along with three T Mk.7s. Twenty-four F Mk.8s were ordered in 1949, but this order was stopped by an embargo. A further order for 12 ex-RAF F.8s was placed in December 1952, of which four were delivered before the order was cancelled, with the final eight being delivered in 1955, along with three more T Mk.7s. and six NF Mk.13s, all ex-RAF aircraft. Britain had allowed the Meteor sales as part of an effort to foster and support good relations; tensions over the Suez Canal led to arms sales being suspended once again.

Egyptian Meteors participated in the fighting during the Suez Crisis of 1956, typically being used in ground attack missions against Israeli forces. In one incident, an Egyptian Meteor NF Mk.13 claimed to have damaged an RAF Vickers Valiant bomber. An aerial bombing campaign of Egyptian airfields by Anglo-French forces resulted in several aircraft being destroyed on the ground; the Egyptian Air Force subsequently withdrew from combat within the Sinai region.

=== Syria ===
Meteors were the first jet aircraft of the fledgling Syrian Air Force. It acquired 25 of them between 1952 and 1956. Although the British were willing to supply aircraft, they did not supply combat training or radar. As Syria became more aligned with Gamal Abdel Nasser and Egypt, British support for Meteor operations was withdrawn and Syrian pilots began training with their Egyptian counterparts. During the Suez Crisis, the RAF performed high altitude reconnaissance flights over Syria by English Electric Canberra aircraft from bases in Cyprus. Lacking radar to track the aircraft, the Syrian Air Force developed a ground spotter network that reported information by telephone to intercept the flights. On 6 November 1956, a Syrian Meteor shot down a Canberra of No. 13 Squadron RAF, which crashed in Lebanon. In 1957, Syria began to replace its Meteors with new MiG-17s from the Soviet Union.

=== France ===
The French Air Force was keen to acquire jet aircraft as part of its re-equipment program following the Second World War. In 1953, 25 new-build aircraft were diverted from RAF orders to fulfil a French order; a further 16 ex-RAF NF.11s were purchased in 1954 and delivered between September 1954 and April 1955, these being supplemented by about 14 T Mk.7s. The NF Mk.11s replaced the Mosquito night fighter with the Escadre de Chasse (EC) 30, serving with that Wing until replaced by the Sud Aviation Vautour in 1957. Several Meteors were then transferred to ECN 1/7 in Algeria, which saw combat in the Algerian War, operating from Bône, while others were used for training Vautour night fighter crews. The Vautour was retired from French Air Force service in 1964. Five Meteor NF.11s were transferred to the Centre d’Essais en Vol (Flight Test Centre) in 1958, where they were used as equipment testbeds and chase planes, and were later joined by two NF Mk.13s and two NF Mk.14s. The test aircraft were used in a wide variety of experiments, including radar and missile tests and during the development of Concorde.

=== Israel ===
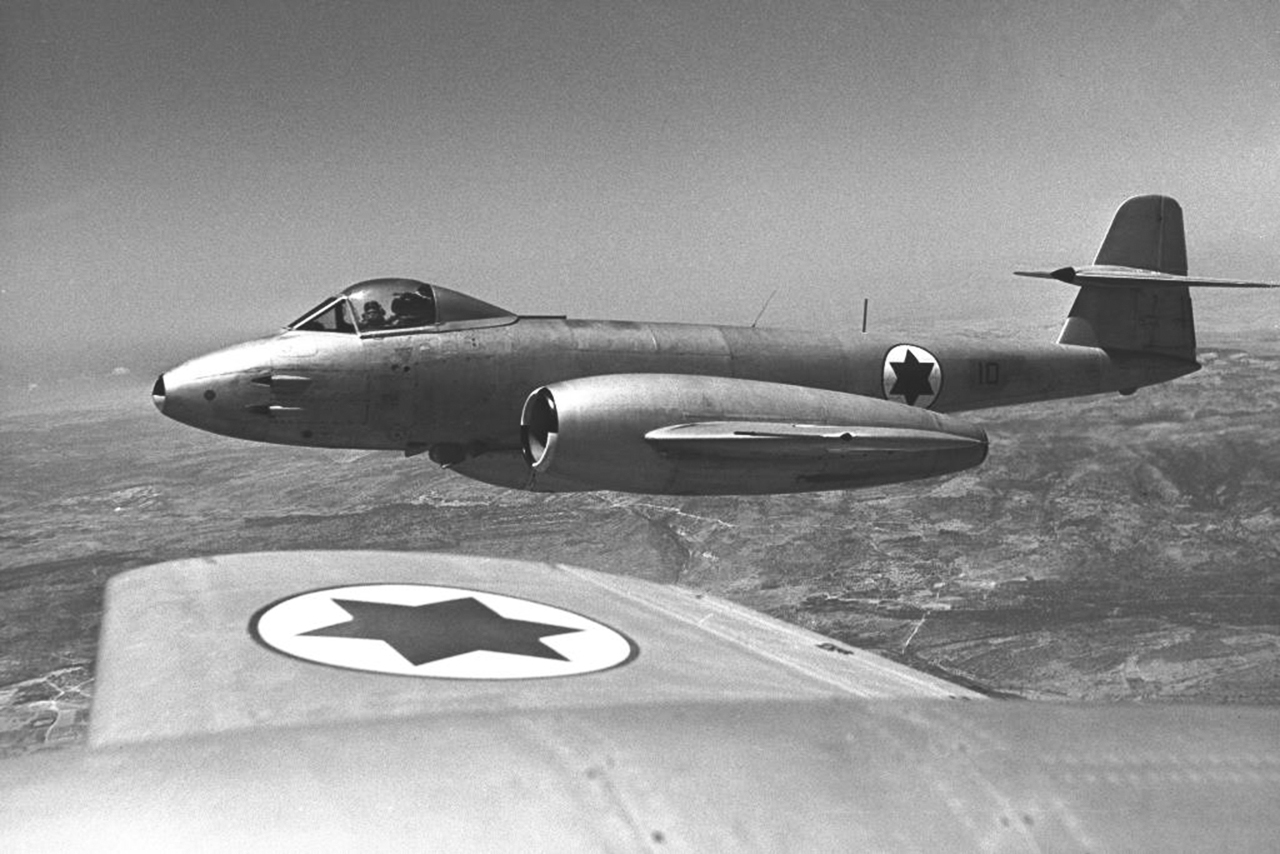
Israeli Air Force Meteor in 1954

Due to tensions between the newly formed nation of Israel and its neighbours, both sides had commenced an arms race which led to jet aircraft being vigorously purchased by various countries in the region. In 1953 Israel ordered four T Mk.7s and 11 F Mk.8s, with delivery continuing until early 1954. The F Mk.8s were modified to carry American HVAR rockets but were otherwise identical to RAF aircraft. A second batch of seven refurbished FR Mk.9s and two more T Mk.7s was delivered in 1955. In 1956, Israel purchased six NF Mk.13s, with three delivered that year, and the remaining three, delayed by an arms embargo, in 1958. Five more T Mk.7s were later purchased, these were converted from ex-Belgian F Mk.4s and were fitted with the Mk.8 tail.

On 1 September 1955, an Israeli Meteor shot down an Egyptian de Havilland Vampire, the first jet aircraft to be shot down in the theatre. The Meteor played a key role during the Suez Crisis; on 28 October 1956, an Israeli NF.13 took part in Operation Tarnegol, in which it successfully located and shot down an Egyptian Ilyushin Il-14 that had been carrying several high-ranking Egyptian military officers on the eve of the crisis. The operation had intended to shoot down the Il-14 that was supposed to be carrying the supreme commander of the Egyptian armed forces, Abdel Hakim Amer, however a different aircraft had been inadvertently attacked and destroyed instead. After deploying paratroopers east of the Suez Canal, the Israeli Air Force continued to support them on the ground predominantly using its jet aircraft, fearing its propeller-driven aircraft would be vulnerable against Egypt's jet fighters.

While initially flying combat air patrol missions, the Meteors and other Israeli aircraft could not prevent effective attacks by Egyptian aircraft on the ground forces. Israeli officers came to recognise that the Meteor was outclassed by Egyptian MiG-15s, and subsequently limited the Meteor's employment as a fighter against other aerial adversaries. Following the start of the Anglo-French bombing campaign against Egyptian airbases, the Egyptian Air Force mostly withdrew from combat in the Sinai, allowing Israeli aircraft to operate unhindered.

The Mk.8s remained in front line service until 1956, and were then used as training aircraft. The NF Mk.13s remained in operational use until 1962.

=== Record setting ===
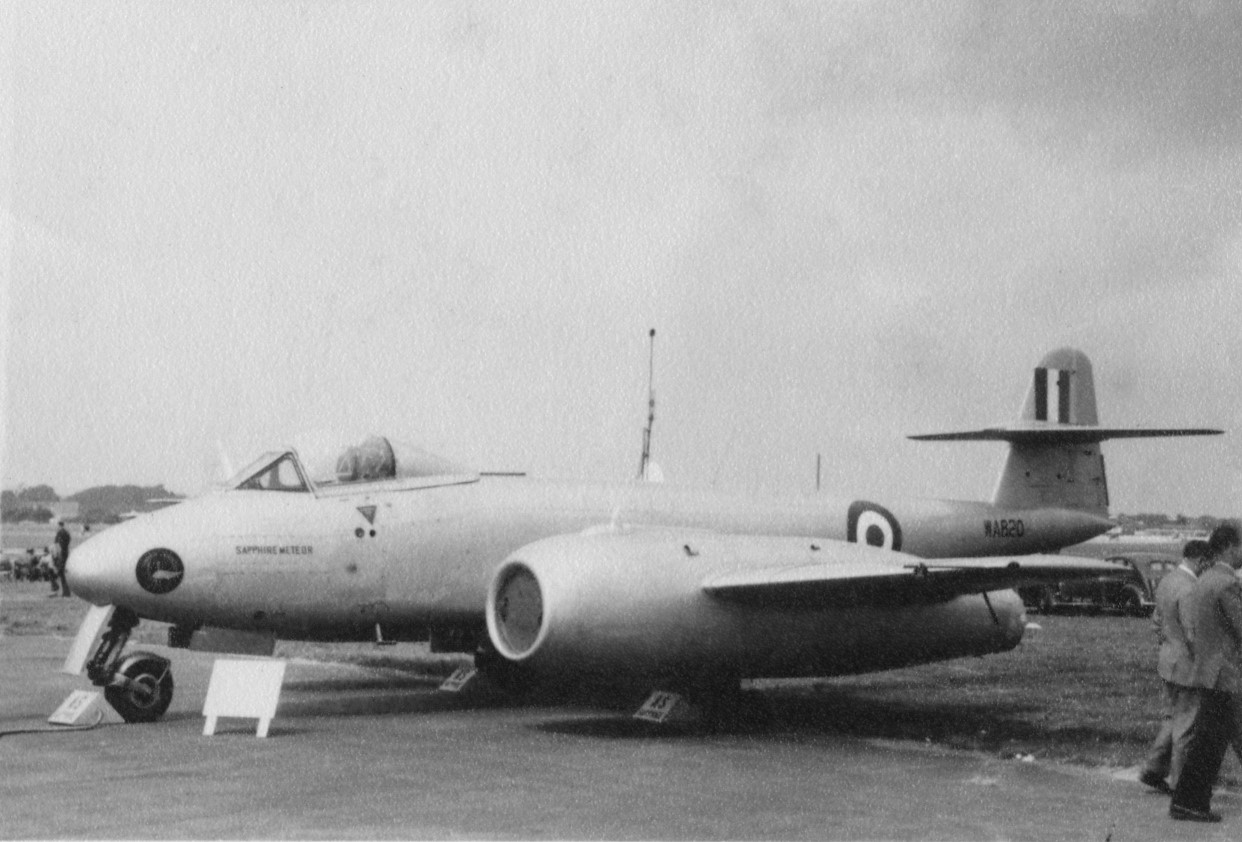
The Sapphire Meteor WA820 on display at Farnborough Airshow, 1951

Late in 1945, two F.3 Meteors were modified for an attempt on the world air speed record. On 7 November 1945 at Herne Bay in Kent, UK, Group Captain Hugh "Willie" Wilson set the first official air speed record by a jet aircraft of 606 mph (975 km/h) TAS. In 1946, Group Captain Edward "Teddy" Donaldson broke this record with a speed of 616 mph (991 km/h) TAS, in EE549, a Meteor F.4.

On 4–5 April 1950, Sqn Ldr Janusz Żurakowski set an international speed record London-Copenhagen-London in a production standard F.8 (VZ468). Suitably impressed, the Danes later purchased the type.

Another "claim to fame" was the Meteor's ability to perform the "Zurabatic Cartwheel", an aerobatics manoeuvre named after Gloster's acting Chief Test Pilot, it was first demonstrated by Meteor G-7-1 G-AMCJ prototype at the 1951 Farnborough Air Show; the Meteor, due to its widely set engines, could have individual engines throttled back and forward to achieve a seemingly stationary vertical cartwheel. Many Meteor pilots went on to "prove their mettle" by attempting the same feat.

On 7 August 1949, the Meteor III, EE397, on loan from the RAF and flown by Flight Refuelling Ltd (FRL) test pilot Patrick Hornidge, took off from Tarrant Rushton and, refuelled 10 times by the Lancaster tanker, remained airborne for 12 hours and 3 minutes, receiving 2,352 imperial gallons (10,690 L) of fuel from the tanker in ten tanker contacts and flying an overall distance of 3,600 miles (5,800 km), achieving a new jet endurance record.

Meteor F.8 WA820 was adapted during 1948 to take two Armstrong Siddeley Sapphire turbojets, and from Moreton Valence, on 31 August 1951, established a time-to-height climb record. The pilot was Flt Lt Tom Prickett, of Armstrong Siddeley. A height of 9,843 ft was reached in 1 min 16 sec, 19,685 ft in 1 min 50 sec, 29,500 ft in 2 min 29 sec, and 39,370 ft in 3 min 7 sec. Air Service Training Ltd were responsible for the conversion.

== Variants ==
Gloster F.9/40
Prototypes, eight built:

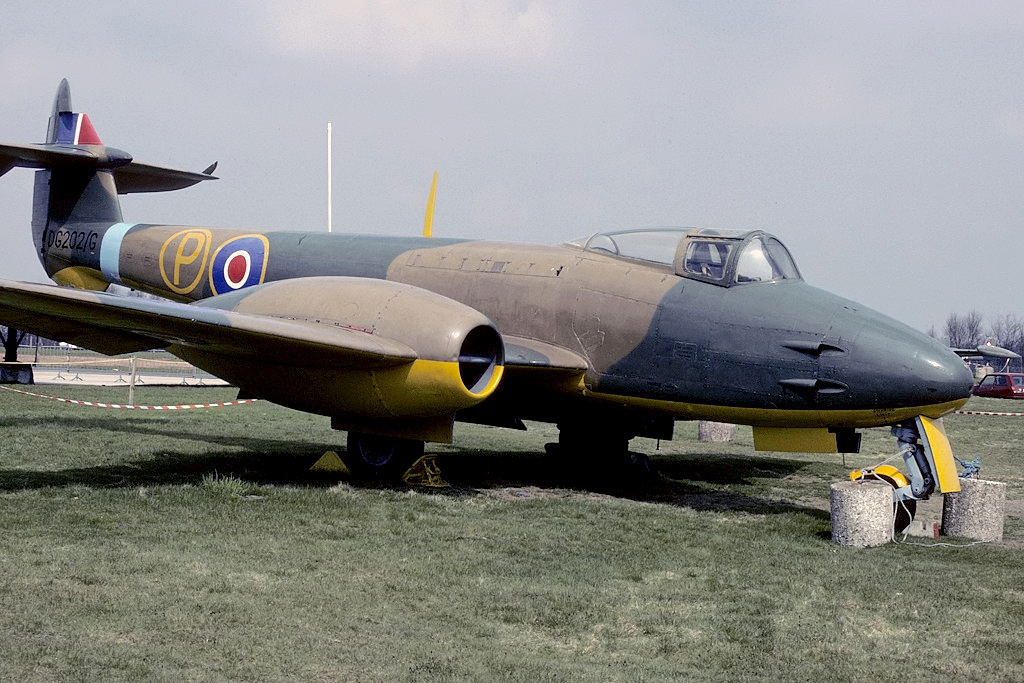
F.9/40 Meteor prototype DG202/G in wartime finish

- DG202/G powered by two Rover W2B jet engines, first flown 24 July 1943.
- DG203/G powered by two Power Jets W2/500 engines, first flown 9 November 1943.
- DG204/G powered by two Metrovick F2 axial jet engines, unlike the other F.9/40s the engines were mounted under the wing, first flown 13 November 1943.
- DG205/G powered by two Rover W2B/23 jet engines, first flown 12 June 1943.
- DG206/G powered by two Halford H1 jet engines, the first to fly on 5 March 1943.
- DG207/G powered by two Halford H1 jet engines, first flown 24 July 1945, became the prototype F.2 variant.
- DG208/G powered by two Rover W2B/23 engines, first flown 20 January 1944.
- DG209/G powered by two Rover W2B/27 engines, first flown 18 April 1944.

Meteor F.1
First production aircraft built between 1943 and 1944, 20 built.
Meteor F.1, Trent turboprop

The Trent Meteor

One-off engine test bed, converted from former No. 616 Squadron RAF operational F.1 serial number EE227, for the Rolls-Royce Trent turboprop engine making it the world's first turboprop-powered aircraft. The undercarriage was lengthened to give ground clearance for the initial 7 ft 7 inch Rotol airscrews. First flying in September 1945, it was not shown publicly until June 1946. It was found that separate controls for thrust and constant speed units required a lot of skill to manage. It was then flown with higher engine thrust and smaller propellers to enable development of a combined control system. The development programme was complete by 1948.
Meteor F.2
Alternative engined version with two Halford H1s – one of the F.9/40s was used as prototype and trials by de Havilland, did not enter production.
Meteor F.3
Derwent I powered, with sliding canopy. First flown 11 September 1944, 210 built (first 15 were Welland-powered).

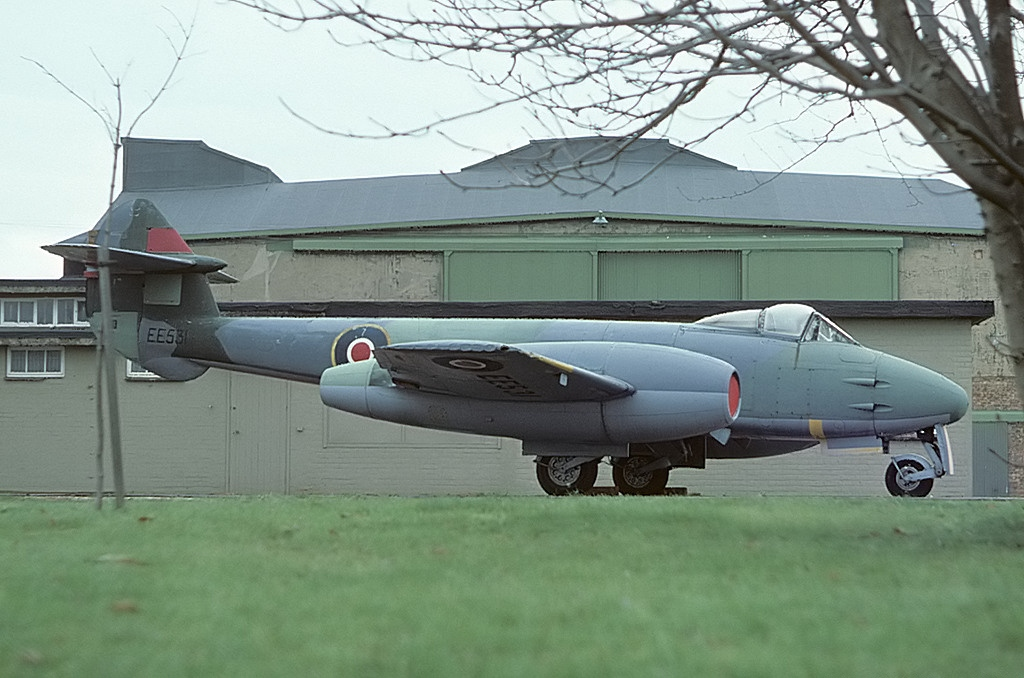
Meteor F.4

Meteor F.4
Derwent 5 powered with strengthened fuselage, 489 built by Gloster and 46 by Armstrong Whitworth for the Royal Air Force. The F.4 was also exported to Argentina (50 aircraft), Belgium (48 aircraft), Denmark (20 aircraft), Egypt (12 aircraft), Netherlands (38 aircraft).
Meteor FR.5
One-off fighter reconnaissance version of the F.4. Fitted with vertical cameras in the nose instead of the four cannon and with oblique cameras in the fuselage. Destroyed on maiden flight, 15 June 1949.
Meteor F.6
Under development in 1946–1947 and in all respects a forebear of the later F.8 having the short wings of the F.4 and a fuselage similar to that of the F.8 and an E.1/44 tail assembly. Did not progress beyond the drawing board and not built.
Meteor T.7
Two-seat trainer variant of the F.4, company prototype first flew 19 March 1948, 640 production aircraft for the Royal Air Force and the Royal Navy (43) and 72 for export (Australia, Belgium, Brazil, Denmark, Egypt, France, Israel, Netherlands). Avions Fairey modified 20 Belgian Air Force F.4s to T.7 standard. Designated T-7 and later TF-7 by the Brazilian Air Force.
Meteor F.8

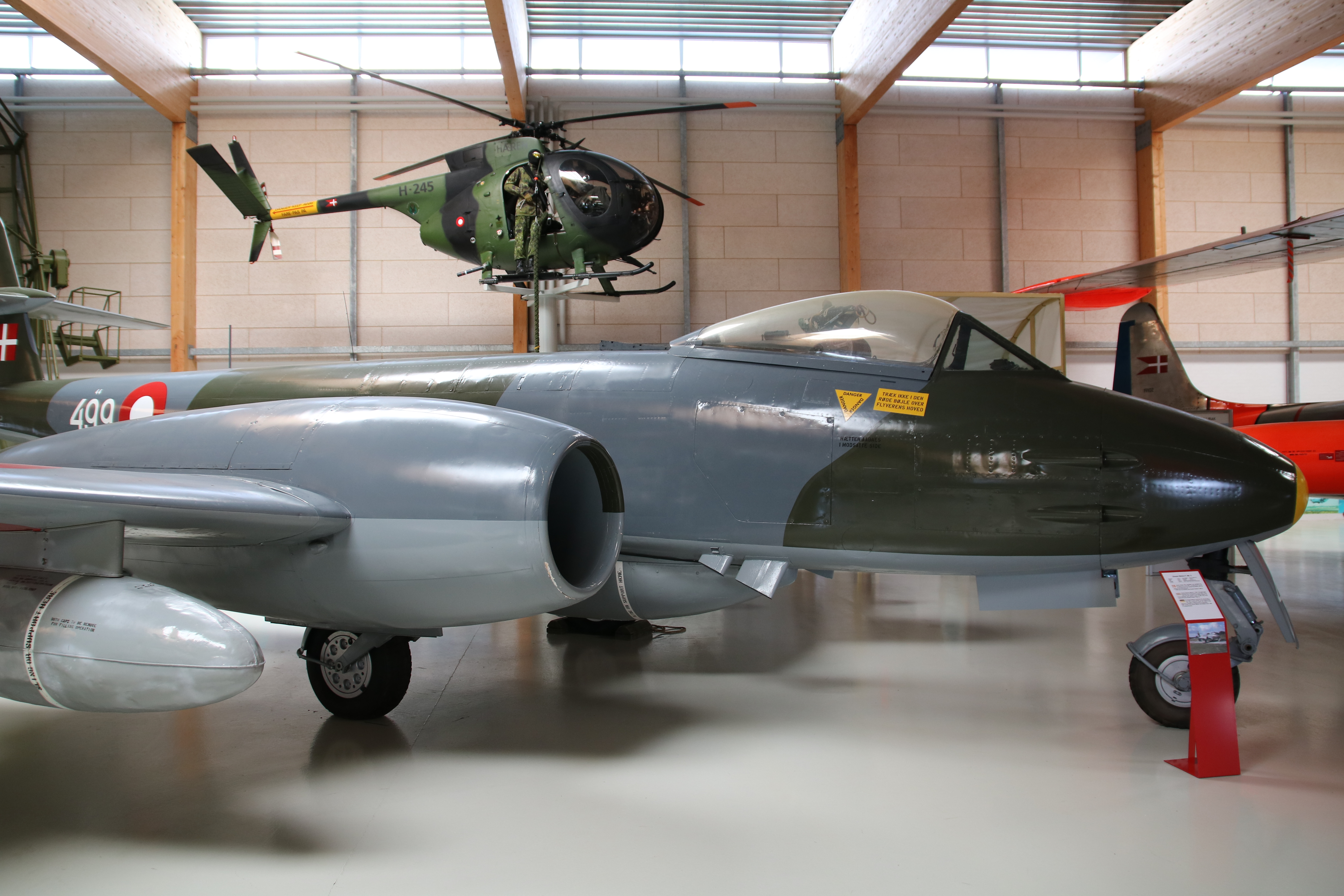
Royal Danish Air Force (RDAF) no. 499 Meteor F. MK.8 on display at Danmarks Flymuseum i Stauning, Skjern, Denmark

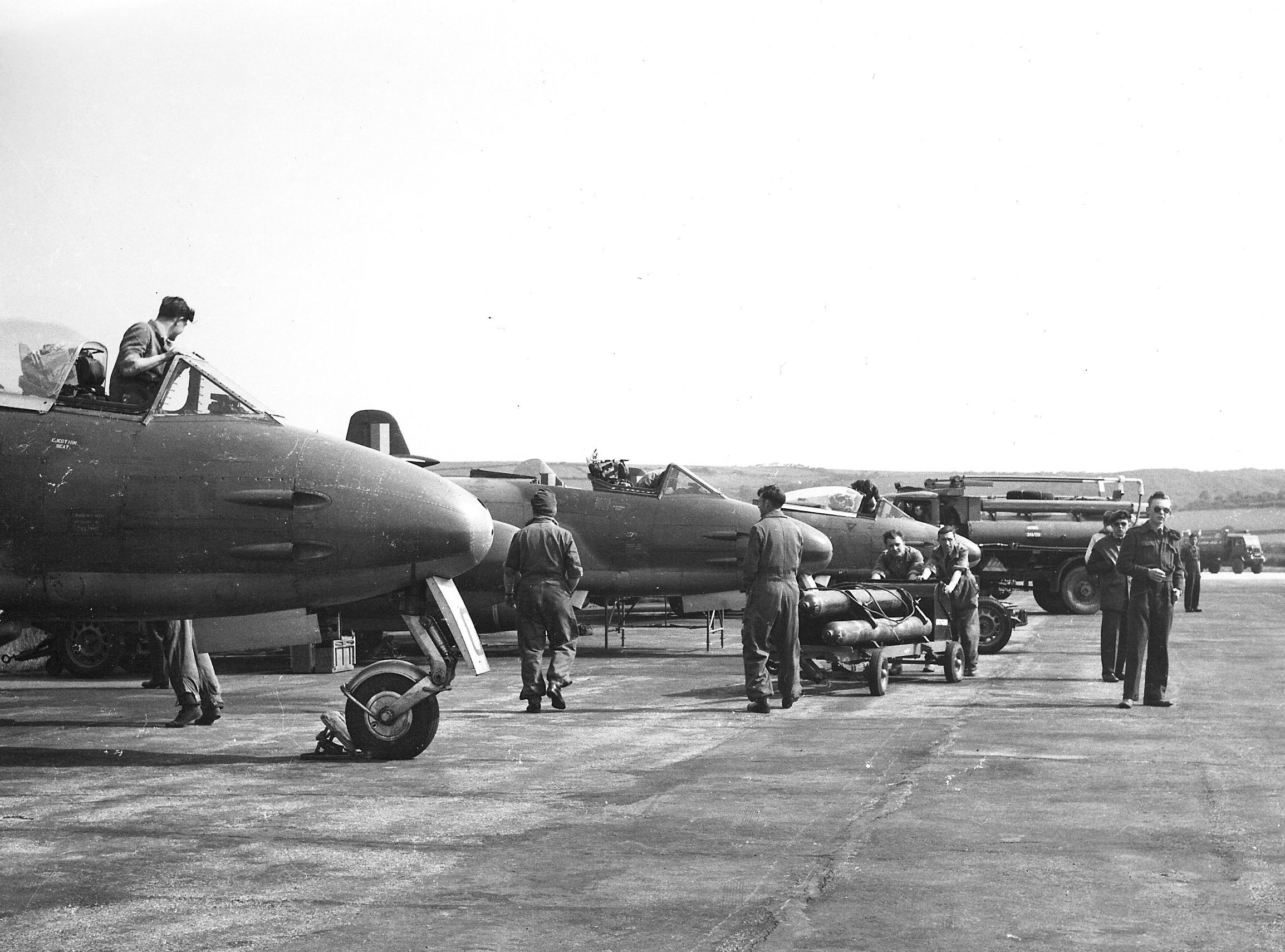
Meteor F.8 being prepared for flight

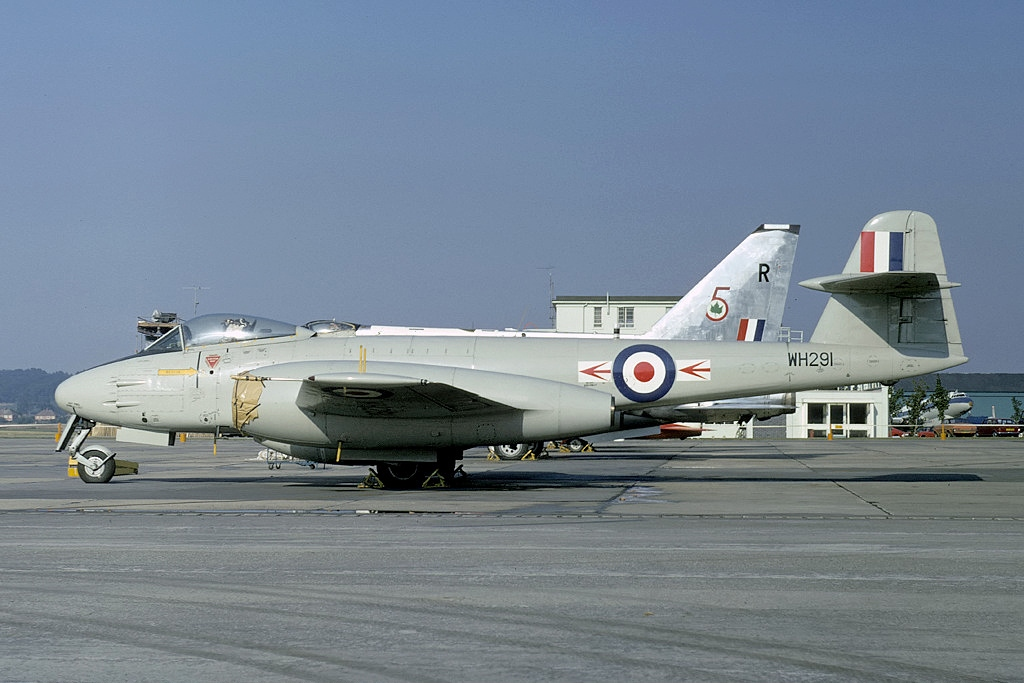
Meteor F.8

Greatly improved from the F.4. Longer fuselage, greater fuel capacity, standard ejection seat and modified tail (derived from the E.1/44). A prolific frontline fighter in the RAF during 1950–54, this variant was ordered by the RAAF, with which it saw action in the Korea War. Designated F-8 by the Brazilian Air Force.
Gloster Meteor F8 "prone pilot"
One-off experimental Meteor F.8 "prone pilot", WK935 modified by Armstrong Whitworth.

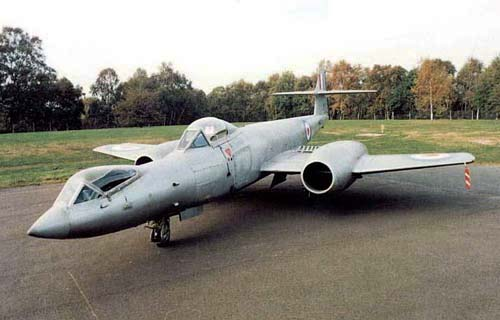
The "prone pilot" experimental testbed

Meteor F.8 jet deflection test-bed
One F.8 (RA490) modified with Rolls-Royce Nene engines cantilevered forward of the wings and "deflection boxes" to direct jet exhaust downwards for jet-lift.
Meteor FR.9
Fighter armed reconnaissance version of the F.8, first flown 23 March 1950, 126 built by Gloster for the Royal Air Force. Former RAF aircraft were later sold to Ecuador, Israel and Syria.
Meteor PR.10
Photo reconnaissance version of the F.8, first flown 29 March 1950, 59 built for the Royal Air Force.
Meteor NF.11
Night Fighter variant with airborne interception (AI) radar designed and built by Armstrong Whitworth, three prototypes followed by 311 production aircraft for the Royal Air Force and 20 for the Royal Danish Air Force.
Meteor NF.12
Longer-nosed version of the NF.11 with American AN/APS-21 radar, this was balanced by a slightly larger fin, first flown on 21 April 1953, 100 built by Armstrong Whitworth.
Meteor NF.13
"Tropicalised" version of the NF.11 to replace the Mosquito NF.36 for service with 39 Squadron in Malta and Cyprus and 219 Squadron based in Egypt. The first of 40 production aircraft built by Armstrong Whitworth was first flown on 21 December 1952. Former Royal Air Force aircraft were later sold to Egypt (6 aircraft), France (2 aircraft), Israel (6 aircraft) and Syria (6 aircraft).
Meteor NF.14
NF.11 with new two-piece blown canopy rather than the heavy-framed version. It also had a longer nose giving a length of 51 ft 4 in. Prototype modified from an NF.11 was first flown 23 October 1953 and was followed by 100 production aircraft built by Armstrong Whitworth for the Royal Air Force.
Meteor U.15
Target drone conversion of the F.4, 92 modified by Flight Refuelling Ltd.
Meteor U.16
Target drone conversion of the F.8, 108 modified by Flight Refuelling.
Meteor TT.20

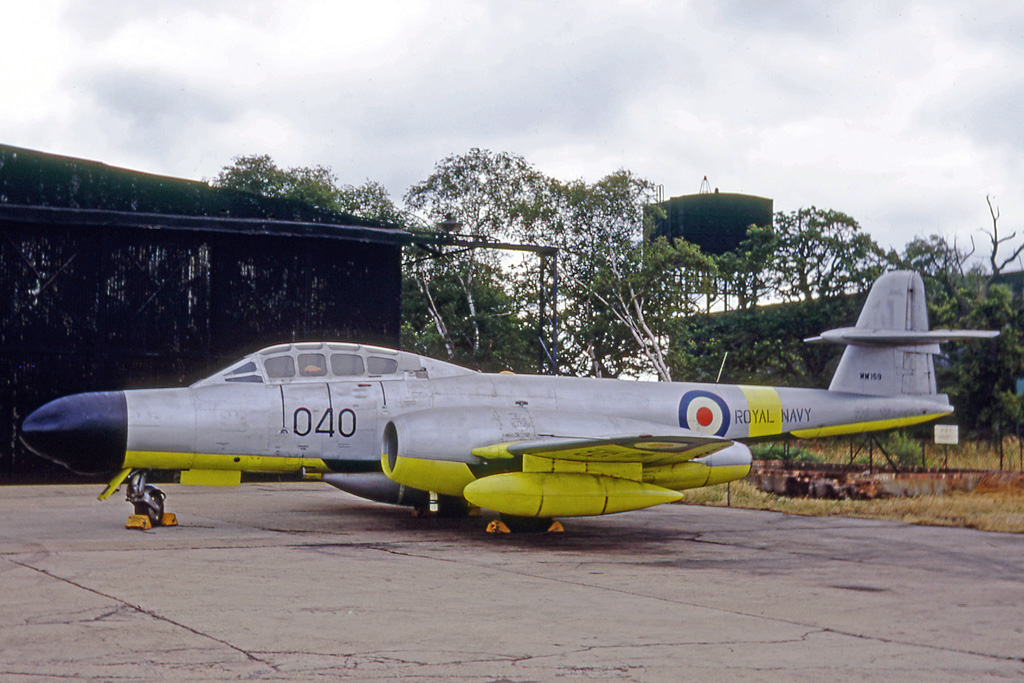
Meteor TT.20 target tug of the Royal Navy in 1967

High speed target towing conversion of the NF.11 for the Royal Navy by Armstrong Whitworth, 20 former Royal Air Force NF.11s were modified. Four additional conversions of four NF.11s of Royal Danish Air Force, after conversion these were flown by civil operators on behalf of the Danish military.
Meteor U.21
Target drone conversion of the F.8 for the Royal Australian Air Force by Flight Refuelling, some aircraft modified in Australia by Fairey Aviation of Australasia using Flight Refuelling supplied modification kits.
Ground attack fighter
Also known as the "Reaper", it was a F.8 modified by Gloster as a private venture ground attack fighter. The modification allowed the carriage of external rocket-assisted take-off Gear (RATOG), added extra pylons on the lower fuselage for expanded ordinance capacity and tip tanks. First flown 4 September 1950, only one was built.
Gloster CXP-1001
A single-engine version of the Meteor proposed by Gloster as a pursuit fighter for the Republic of China Air Force. None were built.

== Operators ==
=== Military operators ===
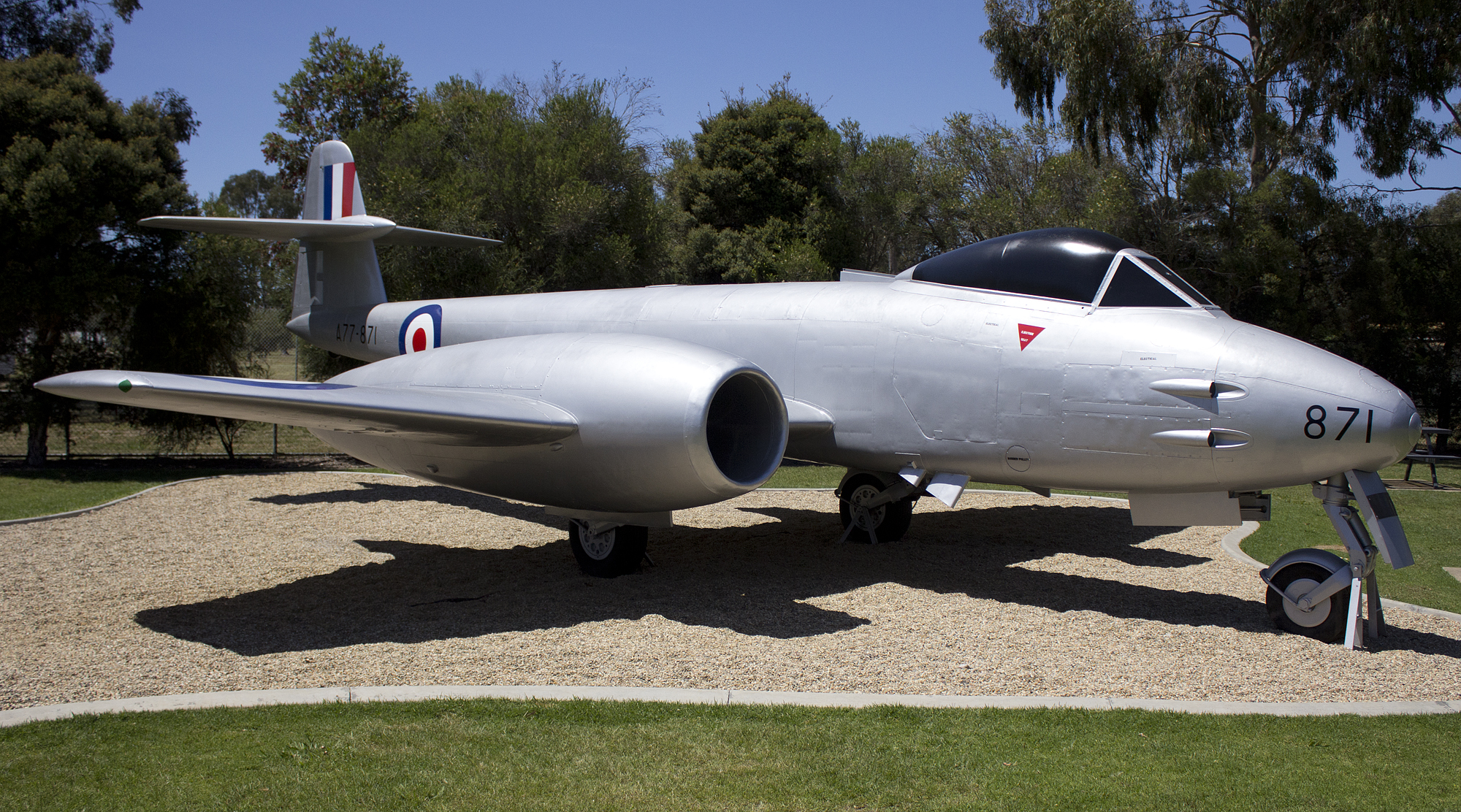
Australian F.8, 2011

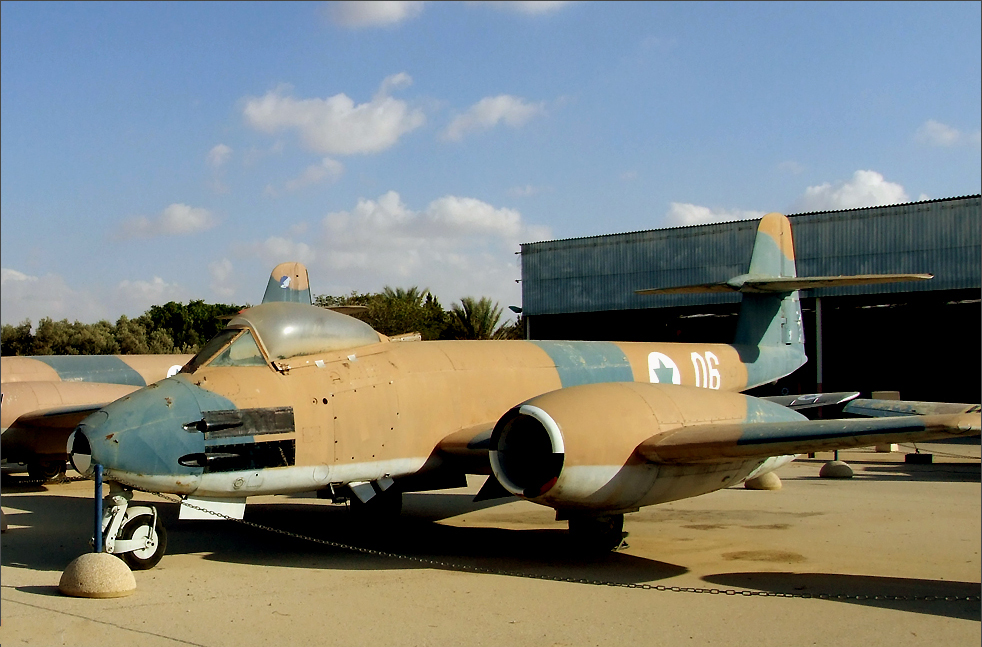
Israeli Meteor F.8, 2008

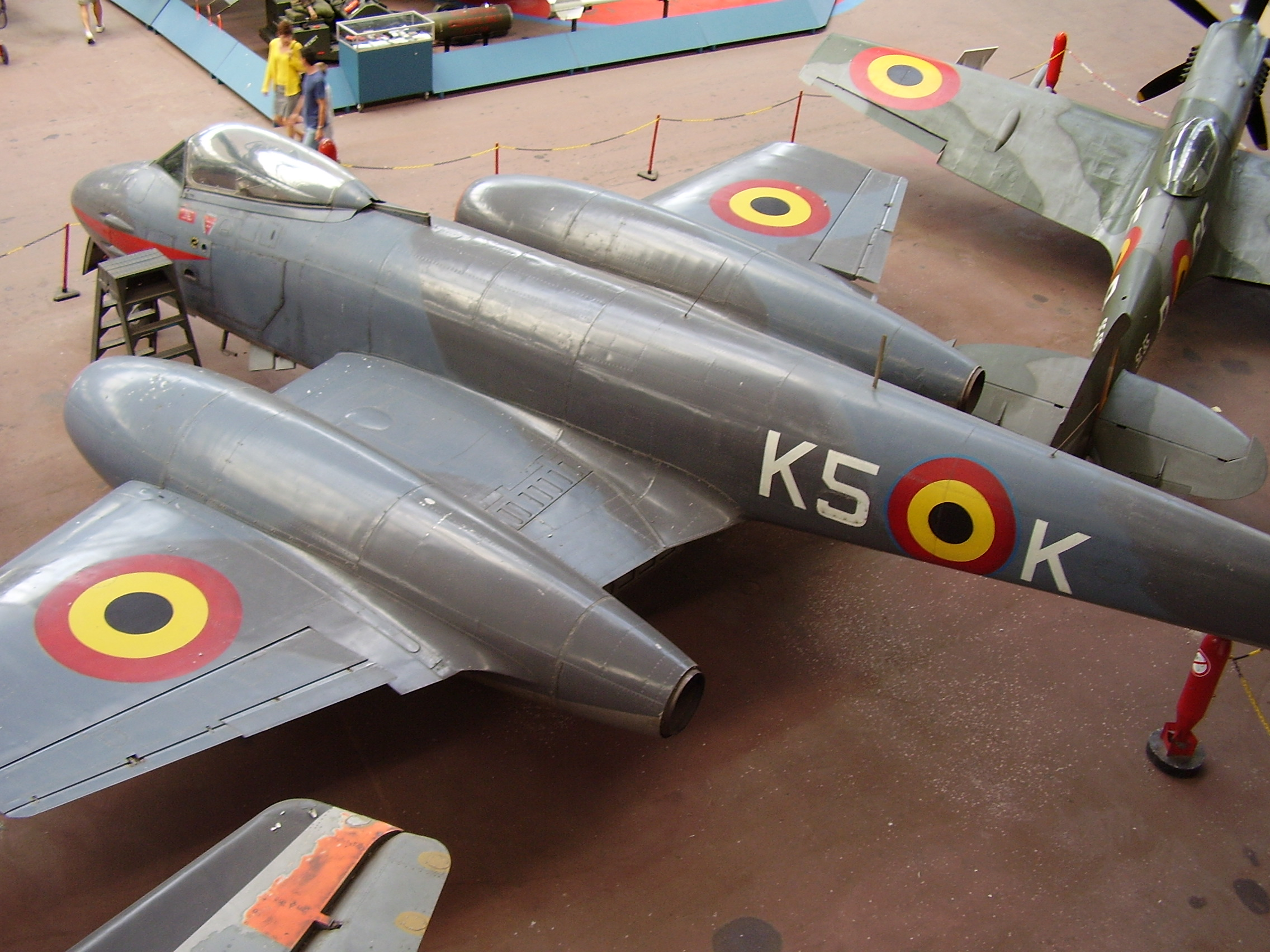
Belgian Meteor F.8 of the 25th Squadron

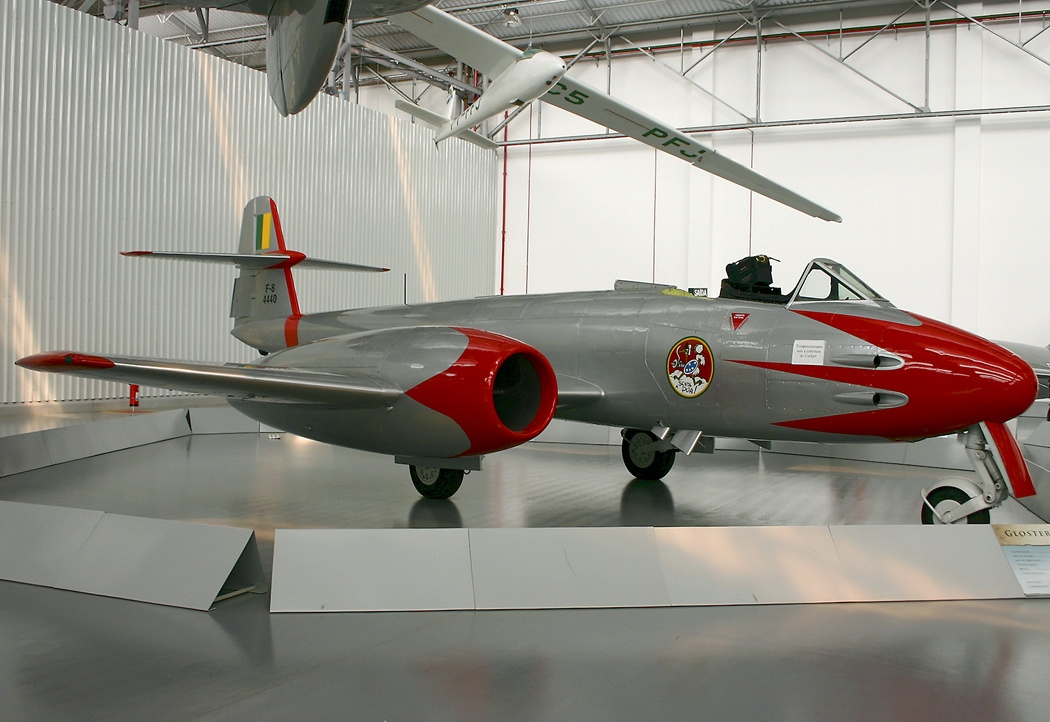
Brazilian Meteor F.8, 2007

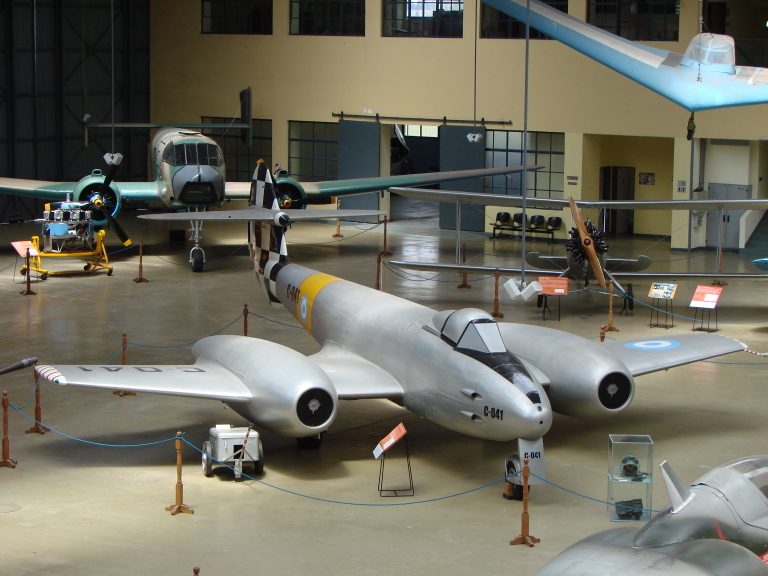
Preserved Argentine Air Force F.4

Argentina

- Argentine Air Force ordered 100 F.4s in May 1947, comprising 50 ex-RAF aircraft and 50 newly built. Deliveries started in July that year, the Meteor remaining in service until 1970, when the last examples were replaced by Dassault Mirage IIIs.

Australia

- Royal Australian Air Force operated 104 aircraft from 1946 to 1947 (1× F.3) and 1951 to 1963 (94× F.8, 9× T.7, 1× NF.11).
  - No. 22 Squadron RAAF
  - No. 23 Squadron RAAF
  - No. 75 Squadron RAAF
  - No. 77 Squadron RAAF

Belgium

- Belgian Air Force received 40 aircraft of F.4 variant, 43 of T.7 variant, 240 of F.8 variant and 24 aircraft of NF.11 variant.

Biafra

- Biafran Air Force purchased two Meteor NF 14s through a cover company. One crashed during a ferry flight between Madeira and Cape Verde, while the second was abandoned at Bissau, Portuguese Guinea. An attempt to purchase a further two ex-Danish target tugs via a German intermediary was discovered by the Bundesnachrichtendienst, the West German intelligence service, and stopped by grounding the aircraft.

Brazil

- Brazilian Air Force received 62 aircraft in F.8 and TF.7 variants.
- 2°/1°GAvCa
- 1°/1°GAvCa
- 1°/14°GAv

Canada

- Royal Canadian Air Force – from 1945 to 1950, one Meteor III and Meteor T.7 were used for tests and evaluation by the RCAF.

Denmark

- Royal Danish Air Force – 20 F.4/F.8, 20× NF.11 and 6× T.7 in service from 1949 to 1962, replaced by 30 Hunter Mk 51 since 1956.

Ecuador

- Ecuadorian Air Force

Egypt

- Royal Egyptian Air Force – used 12× F.4, 6× T.7, 12× F.8 and 6× NF.13 from 1949 to 1958, some of them saw action during Suez Crisis in 1956, replaced by MiG-15bis.

France

- French Air Force

West Germany

- Luftwaffe – Meteor TT.20 target towing aircraft.

Israel

- Israeli Air Force
  - 117 Squadron (First Jet Squadron) – from 1953 to 1962, 4× T.7, 11× F.8, 7× FR.9, and 5× "T.7.5" or "T.8" variants (T.7 with F.8's tail, ex Belgian Air Force).
  - 119 Squadron (Bat Squadron) – from 1956 to 1963, 5× NF.13 variant. (ordered 6 aircraft, but one has crashed during ferry flight to Israel.)
  - 107 Squadron (Knights of the Orange Tail Squadron) – from 1962 to 1964, some F.8 and FR.9 variants, ex 117 sqn.
  - 110 Squadron (Knights of The North Squadron) – from 1962 to early 1970s, some T.7 and T.8 variants, ex 117 sqn. and some F.8 and FR.9 variants, ex 107 sqn.

Netherlands

- Royal Netherlands Air Force – 60× F.4 used 1948–1957, along with 160× F.8 1950–1959, replaced by Hawker Hunter.
  - 322 Squadron RNLAF; 323, 324, 325, 326, 327 and 328 Squadrons
- Dutch Naval Aviation Service

New Zealand

- Royal New Zealand Air Force
  - No. 14 Squadron RNZAF in Cyprus, operated two Meteor T.7 aircraft hired from the RAF.
  - Various squadrons, one F.3 used for pilot jet conversion training, then trade training airframe.

South Africa

- South African Air Force – Meteor F.3 aircraft, in service from 1946 to 1949.

Syria

- Syrian Air Force – used some T.7, F.8, FR.9 variants, and 6× NF.13 variant, from 1951 to early 1960s.

United Kingdom

- Royal Air Force
- No. 1 Squadron RAF
- No. 2 Squadron RAF
- No. 5 Squadron RAF
- No. 8 Squadron RAF
- No. 11 Squadron RAF
- No. 13 Squadron RAF
- No. 19 Squadron RAF
- No. 25 Squadron RAF
- No. 29 Squadron RAF
- No. 33 Squadron RAF
- No. 34 Squadron RAF
- No. 39 Squadron RAF
- No. 41 Squadron RAF
- No. 43 Squadron RAF
- No. 46 Squadron RAF
- No. 54 Squadron RAF
- No. 56 Squadron RAF
- No. 60 Squadron RAF
- No. 63 Squadron RAF
- No. 64 Squadron RAF
- No. 65 Squadron RAF
- No. 66 Squadron RAF
- No. 68 Squadron RAF
- No. 72 Squadron RAF
- No. 74 Squadron RAF
- No. 79 Squadron RAF
- No. 81 Squadron RAF
- No. 85 Squadron RAF
- No. 87 Squadron RAF
- No. 91 Squadron RAF
- No. 92 Squadron RAF
- No. 96 Squadron RAF
- No. 111 Squadron RAF
- No. 124 Squadron RAF
- No. 125 Squadron RAF
- No. 141 Squadron RAF
- No. 151 Squadron RAF
- No. 152 Squadron RAF
- No. 153 Squadron RAF
- No. 208 Squadron RAF
- No. 219 Squadron RAF
- No. 222 Squadron RAF
- No. 234 Squadron RAF
- No. 245 Squadron RAF
- No. 247 Squadron RAF
- No. 256 Squadron RAF
- No. 257 Squadron RAF
- No. 263 Squadron RAF
- No. 264 Squadron RAF
- No. 266 Squadron RAF
- No. 500 Squadron RAF
- No. 501 Squadron RAF
- No. 504 Squadron RAF
- No. 527 Squadron RAF
- No. 541 Squadron RAF
- No. 600 Squadron RAF
- No. 601 Squadron RAF
- No. 604 Squadron RAF
- No. 609 Squadron RAF
- No. 610 Squadron RAF
- No. 611 Squadron RAF
- No. 615 Squadron RAF
- No. 616 Squadron RAF
- Fleet Air Arm
- 700 Naval Air Squadron
- 702 Naval Air Squadron
- 703 Naval Air Squadron
- 728 Naval Air Squadron
- 736 Naval Air Squadron
- 759 Naval Air Squadron
- 764 Naval Air Squadron
- 767 Naval Air Squadron
- 771 Naval Air Squadron
- 781 Naval Air Squadron
- 806 Naval Air Squadron
- 813 Naval Air Squadron

United States

- United States Army Air Forces tested one aircraft and returned it to UK after tests.

=== Civilian operators ===
Sweden

- Svensk Flygtjänst AB Three Meteor T.7 and four Meteor TT.20 for target towing between 1955 and 1974.

United Kingdom

- DERA, based at Llanbedr used NF.11 variant WD790 between 1952 and 1982
- Martin-Baker Aircraft Company has used various variants since 1946 to test their ejection seats
- Ferranti Flying Unit, based at RAF Turnhouse used NF.14 variant WM261 G-ARCX to test airborne radar and gunsights between 1960 and 1969
- Flight Refuelling Ltd (FRL) were lent the RAF Meteor F.3 EE397 for use in probe-and-drogue trials. This aircraft set a world jet endurance record of 12 hours and 3 minutes on 7 August 1949
- Classic Air Force
- Airwork Fleet Requirements Unit used TT.20 variant between 1958 and 1971

== Surviving aircraft ==
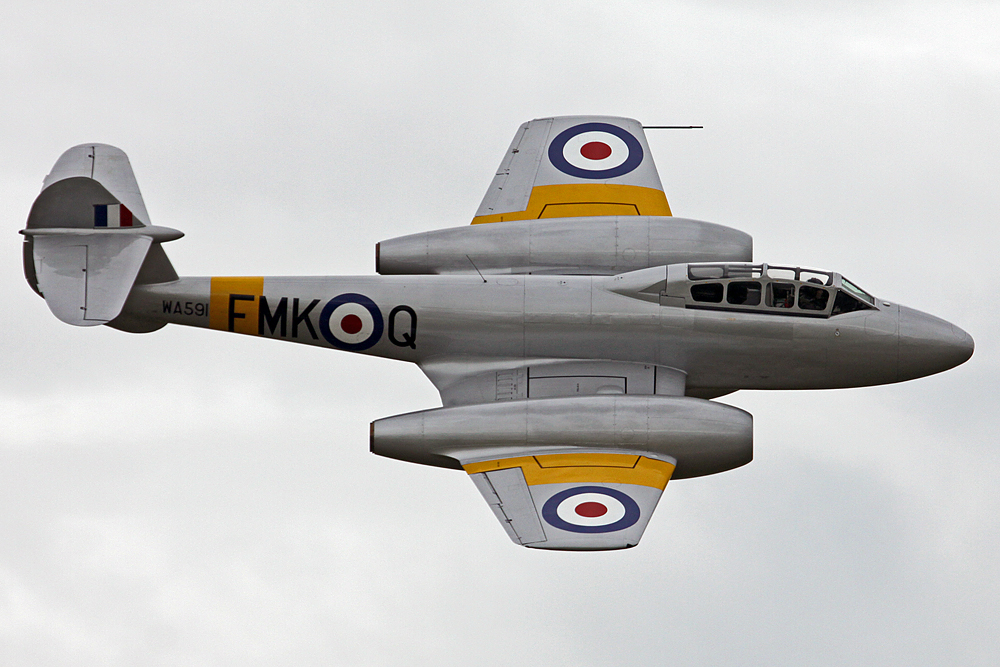
Meteor T.7 G-BWMF formerly of the Classic Air Force displaying at RNAS Yeovilton, 2012

Although many Meteors survive in museums, collections and on pylons in public spaces as gate guardians, only four remain airworthy.

- UK – Two of the airworthy Meteors are in the United Kingdom:

- Two Meteor T.7/F.8 Hybrids used by Martin-Baker as ejection seat test aircraft "G-JMWA/WA638" & "WL419". Both are last recorded as being at Chalgrove.

- Australia – A former RAF F.8 VH-MBX (this being a play on the Meteor's nickname of "Meatbox") at the Temora Aviation Museum with Royal Australian Air Force markings as 'A77-851'. Ownership was transferred to the RAAF in July 2019 and it is operated by the Air Force Heritage Squadron (Temora Historic Flight).
- USA – A former RAF T7 WA591/G-BWMF is in the Planes of Fame Air Museum in Chino, California.

== Specifications (Meteor F.8) ==
Data from The Great Book of Fighters, Quest for Performance and Aircraft in Profile, Volume 1

General characteristics

- Crew: 1
- Length: 44 ft 7 in (13.59 m)
- Wingspan: 37 ft 2 in (11.33 m)
- Height: 13 ft 0 in (3.96 m)
- Wing area: 350 sq ft (33 m^{2})
- Airfoil: root: EC(12.5)40/0640; tip: EC1040/0640
- Empty weight: 10,684 lb (4,846 kg)
- Gross weight: 15,700 lb (7,121 kg)
- Powerplant: 2 × Rolls-Royce Derwent 8 centrifugal flow turbojet engine, 3,600 lbf (16 kN) thrust each

Performance

- Maximum speed: 600 mph (970 km/h, 520 kn) at 10,000 ft (3,000 m)
- Maximum speed: Mach 0.82
- Range: 600 mi (970 km, 520 nmi)
- Service ceiling: 43,000 ft (13,000 m)
- Rate of climb: 7,000 ft/min (36 m/s)
- Time to altitude: 30,000 ft (9,100 m) in 5 minutes
- Wing loading: 44.9 lb/sq ft (219 kg/m^{2})
- Thrust/weight: 0.45

Armament

- Guns: 4 × 20 mm Hispano MkV cannon
- Rockets: Provision for up to sixteen "60 lb" RP-3 rockets or eight 5-inch HVAR rockets under outer wings
- Bombs: two 1000 lb (450 kg) bombs

== See also ==
- Gloster E.28/39

Aircraft of comparable role, configuration, and era

- Alekseyev I-21 – (Soviet Union)
- Bell P-59 Airacomet – (United States)
- de Havilland Vampire – (United Kingdom)
- Heinkel He 280 – (Nazi Germany)
- Lockheed P-80 Shooting Star – (United States)
- McDonnell FH Phantom – (United States)
- Messerschmitt Me 262 – (German Reich)
- Nakajima Kikka – (Empire of Japan)
- Sukhoi Su-9 (1946) – (Soviet Union)

Related lists

- List of jet aircraft of World War II
- List of aircraft of World War II
- List of non-carrier aircraft flown from aircraft carriers
