= Gloster E.1/44 =

British prototype jet fighter design

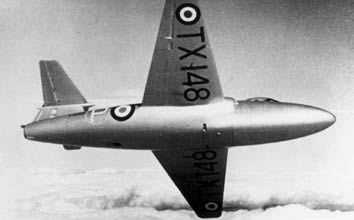
- TX148, the third prototype on a test flight, c. 1949

General information
- Type: Fighter
- Manufacturer: Gloster Aircraft Company
- Designer: George Carter
- Primary user: Royal Air Force (intended)
- Number built: 3 (4th prototype not completed)

History
- First flight: 9 March 1948
- Retired: Cancelled

The Gloster E.1/44 was a British single-engined jet fighter design of the Second World War, developed and produced by the British aviation firm Gloster Aircraft Company. It was amongst the first jet-propelled aircraft to be developed and was produced on an experimental basis.

Following favourable testing of Britain's first jet propelled aircraft, the turbojet-powered Gloster E.28/39 in 1941, there was considerable interest in the application of the new propulsion technology to fighter aircraft. During 1942, work commenced upon a development of a larger twin-engined fighter aircraft, which became the Gloster Meteor, the first Allied jet fighter. British industrial manufacturer Rover, who had already been contracted to produce the Power Jets W.2 jet engine, had considerable difficulty in achieving sufficient engine production during the war. Concerned by the wider production consequences of this shortage, the Air Ministry recognised the potential value of adopting a single-engined aircraft over the twin-engine configuration of the Meteor, leading to the issuing of Specification E.5/42, calling for the design and manufacture of such a fighter.

Gloster was amongst those companies to receive the specification and produced a single-engine fighter design with a low-wing monoplane configuration, which was to be equipped with a highly tapered wing and a T-tail, as well as being alternatively powered by either a single Halford H.1 or Rolls-Royce Nene engine, fed by air intakes in the wing roots. During late 1943, work on a pair of prototypes, as the GA.1, commenced. Engine manufacturing problems were mostly rectified following the reassignment of production activity to Rolls-Royce Limited. Gloster decided to refine the GA.1 independently, until the Air Ministry issued Specification E.1/44 during 1944, which sought an experimental jet-powered aircraft powered by the Rolls-Royce Nene, leading to the revised GA.2. Progress on the new fighter was slow, Gloster having concentrated on the development and production of the Meteor. On 9 March 1948, the second E.1/44 performed its maiden flight at RAF Boscombe Down. Testing revealed unpromising performance and characteristics and Gloster recognised the Meteor as having more development potential and the aircraft never entered production.

== Development ==
=== Background ===
The development of the turbojet-powered E.1/44 was the product of a collaboration between the Gloster Aircraft Company and Sir Frank Whittle's firm, Power Jets Ltd. Whittle had formed Power Jets in March 1936 to develop his ideas of jet propulsion, with Whittle as the company's chief engineer. For several years, attracting financial backers and aviation firms prepared to take on Whittle's radical ideas was difficult; in 1931, Armstrong-Siddeley had evaluated and rejected Whittle's proposal, finding it to be technically sound but at the limits of engineering capability. Securing funding was a persistently worrying issue throughout the early development of the engine. The first Whittle prototype jet engine, the Power Jets WU, began running trials in early 1937; shortly afterwards, Sir Henry Tizard, chairman of the Aeronautical Research Committee and the Air Ministry gave the project their support.

On 28 April 1939, Whittle made a visit to the premises of the Gloster Aircraft Company, where he met several key figures, such as George Carter, Gloster's chief designer. Carter took a keen interest in Whittle's project, particularly when he saw the operational Power Jets W.1 engine; Carter quickly made several rough proposals of various aircraft designs powered by the engine. Independently, Whittle had also been producing proposals for a high-altitude jet-powered bomber; following the start of the Second World War and the Battle for France, a greater national emphasis on fighter aircraft arose. Power Jets and Gloster quickly formed a mutual understanding around mid-1939.

In September 1939, the Air Ministry issued a specification to Gloster for an aircraft to test one of Whittle's turbojet designs in flight, resulting in the development of the Gloster E.28/39, the first British jet aircraft. The name adopted for this initial proof of concept aircraft, E.28/39, originated from the aircraft having been developed in conformance with the 28th "Experimental" specification issued by the Air Ministry in 1939. While the specification had included provisions for armaments, these were not initially included and the aircraft was principally intended to demonstrate the viability, qualities, and potential value of jet propulsion in broad terms, not to immediately produce a combat aircraft. On 15 May 1941, Gloster's Chief Test Pilot, Flight Lieutenant Gerry Sayer flew the aircraft under jet power for the first time from RAF Cranwell, near Sleaford in Lincolnshire, in a flight lasting 17 minutes.

=== Proposals ===
The successful testing of the E.28/39 had directly led to the design of the twin-engined Gloster Meteor jet fighter from 1940. During 1942, engine manufacturer Rover, who had already been contracted to produce the Power Jets W.2 jet engine, had experienced production problems and the Air Ministry decided to issue Specification E.5/42 for an aircraft which would only be powered by one engine. Gloster produced a design which developed into a low-wing monoplane equipped with a highly tapered wing and a T-tail arrangement, along with a tailwheel undercarriage. It was to be powered by a Halford H.1 or Rolls-Royce Nene engine fed by intakes in the wing roots. During late 1943, construction activity on a pair of prototype GA.1s, commenced.

The difficulties of manufacture were resolved by Rolls-Royce Limited exchanging jet engine production (as such, the W2 engine would become known as the Welland) for Meteor tank engine production with Rover, Rolls-Royce overcoming the production problems. Demand for a single-engined design dissipated and the fledgling GA.1 was no longer required. Gloster continued to work on the design privately, intending to adopt a Halford H.1 engine to power the type instead of the W2/Welland.

During 1944, the Air Ministry issued Specification E.1/44 for an experimental jet-powered aircraft that would be powered the new Rolls-Royce Nene engine. Gloster's design team decided to approach the specified requirements of this new specification by developing a new design, GA.2. It was not based on the earlier E.5/42, being a significantly larger aeroplane. During 1944, after reviewing submissions, the Air Ministry issued a contract to Gloster for a prototype; this order was joined during late 1945 by additional orders for the completion of a further three aircraft.

== Design ==
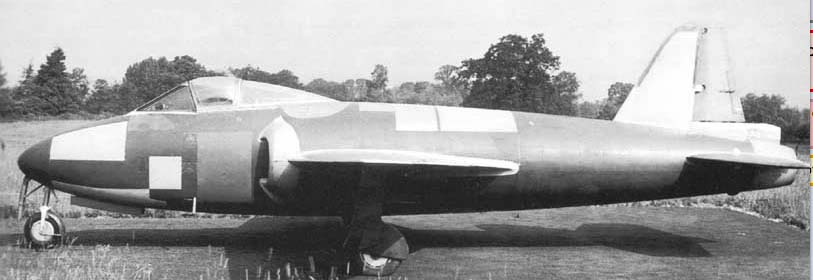
Gloster E.1/44 SM809, fitted with the original tail unit, circa 1944

The Gloster E.1/44 was a stressed-skin mid-winged monoplane design, featuring a relatively broad fuselage and a wide-track undercarriage. The design bore little resemblance to the twin-jet Meteor and only superficial similarities to the earlier pioneering E.28/39, being a larger and significantly heavier aircraft. Unlike the E.28/39, which had a central air intake in the nose into a straight-through duct to reach its turbojet engine, the E.1/44's Nene received air via a pair of semi-circular air intakes ahead of the wing roots. The tailplane was mounted midway up the rear fuselage, set beneath the single fin and rudder. Unlike the earlier E.5/42, a widely spaced tricycle landing gear arrangement was adopted for the E.1/44.

The unusually wide fuselage of the E.1/44 was made in sections, the front of which being attached to the central section via four longerons. The centre fuselage, composed of reinforced Z-section frames and heavy double-channel section frames, accommodated the Nene and attachment points for the centre-section of the wing. Set into the sides of the central section were the air intakes, which featured boundary-layer bleeds and were readily detachable. The rear fuselage section used semi-monocoque construction, reinforced by several Z-section frames and top-hat stringers; the detachable tail section featured a similar structure. Apart from the upper portion of the fin, which was composed of wood for its insulating properties, the tail unit was an all-metal, stressed-skin unit. Rivets were used to attach the sections.

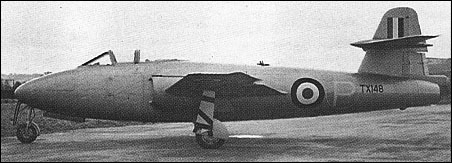
Gloster E.1/44, equipped with the revised tail unit, circa 1949

The centre-section of the wing, which accommodated the flaps, inboard air brakes and main undercarriage, was a single-spar stressed-skin structure, with an auxiliary rear spar. Both spars use a plate web design; the main spar's booms were composed from high-tensile steel, the rear spar of light-alloy booms. The outer portions of the wing, which had similar construction, were fixed at the spars and at the leading edge. An unusual feature of the aircraft was the skin of the wings, which was composed of relatively difficult-to-work stainless-steel.

The flying controls of the E.1/44 were relatively conventional, employing an array of push-rods and spring-torque shafts (the latter being primarily used for actuation of the spring tabs) to feed control inputs to the flight control surfaces. Power for the undercarriage and the flaps was provided by a Dowty hydraulic pump, driven via a gear box from the Nene engine. For emergencies, there was a hand-pump for the flight surfaces and a compressed-air system for the undercarriage. Electrical power was provided by a 1,500-watt HX2 generator, also driven via the gear box, which charged a pair of series-connected 12-volt accumulators. Equipment included a two-way radio set, IFF, oxygen tanks, windscreen de-icing system, fire detectors and fire extinguishers and a drogue parachute in the tail.

== Construction and testing ==
Progress on the new fighter was slow, Gloster having chosen to concentrate on the twin-engined Meteor and the first prototype was not completed until July 1947. The project received a considerable setback when the prototype was destroyed in a road accident while being transported to RAF Boscombe Down for flight testing.

The first E.1/44 to fly was the second prototype. On 9 March 1948, it performed its maiden flight at RAF Boscombe Down, flown by Gloster Chief Test Pilot Bill Waterton. Reportedly, Waterton was not impressed with the aircraft, commenting on its lack of power and its unfavourable flying characteristics, unflatteringly referring to it as the "Gormless". While this unofficial name never stuck, the prototype never received an official name, although "Ace" was proposed at one point. Shortly after its first flight, the second prototype was dispatched to RAF Moreton Valence, Gloucestershire for further test flights.

Initial flight testing confirmed the aircraft's poor handling and a revised tail unit with a high mounted tailplane was installed. While this change has been credited with resolving the handling problems, performance remained little better than that of the existing Meteor. This comparison was a major factor in the termination of the test programme during 1949 as the design did not possess the development potential of the Meteor. The fourth prototype (TX150) was never completed.

Some elements of the design were used in other aircraft. The revised tail design developed for the E.1/44 was carried over to the Meteor, being employed on the Meteor F 8 and later models. Following the end of the programme, the two aircraft to achieve flight continued in use as aerial test beds for some time before being scrapped; reportedly, at least one of these prototypes remained in existence as late as 1951.

== Variants ==
GA.1
Single-engined version of the design to meet Air Ministry Specification E.5/42 – two aircraft serial numbers SM801 and SM805, construction abandoned.
GA.2 Ace
Improved variant to meet E.1/44, three built, SM809 was destroyed during transit to Boscombe Down by road and never flew. TX145 was first to fly on 9 March 1948. TX148 with a modified tail first flew in 1949, the tail design was later used on the Gloster Meteor F.8.
GA.3
Pre-production aircraft, serial number TX150, not built.
GA.4
Forty early production aircraft were ordered in two batches in April and July 1946, cancelled and not built.

== Specifications (E.1/44) ==
Data from Jane's all the World's Aircraft 1949-50, The British Fighter since 1912

General characteristics

- Crew: 1
- Length: 38 ft 1 in (11.6 m)
- Wingspan: 36 ft 1 in (11 m)
- Height: 18 ft 4 in (5.6 m)
- Wing area: 254 sq ft (23.6 m^{2})
- Empty weight: 8,260 lb (3,747 kg)
- Gross weight: 11,470 lb (5,203 kg)
- Fuel capacity: 428 imp gal (514 US gal; 1,950 L) including two overload tanks in rear fuselage; Provision also made for under-wing drop tanks.
- Powerplant: 1 × Rolls-Royce Nene II centrifugal flow turbojet, 5,000 lbf (22 kN) thrust

Performance

- Maximum speed: 620 mph (1,000 km/h, 540 kn)
- Range: 410 mi (660 km, 360 nmi)
- Service ceiling: 44,000 ft (13,000 m)
- Time to altitude: 40,000 ft (12,000 m) in 12 minutes 30 seconds

Armament

- Guns: 4 × 20 mm (0.79 in) Hispano-Suiza HS.404 cannon

== See also ==
Aircraft of comparable role, configuration, and era

- Hawker Sea Hawk
- Supermarine Attacker
