= Rolls-Royce Welland =

Turbojet aircraft engine, Britain's first production jet

Welland
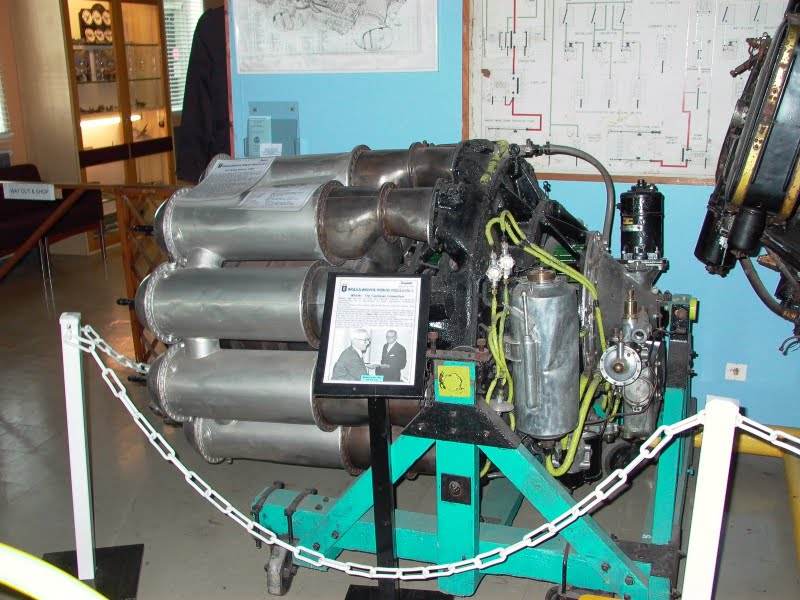
- A Rolls-Royce Welland restored by Aero Engines Carlisle, exhibited in Solway Aviation Museum
- Type: Turbojet
- Manufacturer: Rolls-Royce
- First run: 1942
- Major applications: Gloster Meteor
- Number built: 167

The Rolls-Royce RB.23 Welland was Britain's first production jet engine. It entered production in 1943 for the Gloster Meteor. The name Welland is taken from the River Welland, in keeping with the Rolls-Royce policy of naming early jet engines after rivers based on the idea of continuous flow, air through the engine and water in a river.

The engine was originally developed by Frank Whittle's team at Power Jets and known as the W.2, Whittle's second design and the first intended for eventual production. Power Jets was working with Rover who referred to it as the W.2B/23. The relationship between the companies was strained due to Rover's inability to deliver working parts, and broke when Whittle learned that a team of Rover engineers led by Adrian Lombard and John Herriot had designed their own version, the W.2B/26.

Fed up with Whittle, Rover handed the project, and their design team, to Rolls-Royce, where Stanley Hooker joined the team from Rolls' supercharger division. Hooker's experience in the design of centrifugal superchargers, along with improved metals and combustion systems, put the engine back on track and it soon entered production.

The Welland was used only for a short time. Hooker continued development of the W.2B/26, which featured an improved layout. This soon entered production as the Rolls-Royce Derwent with higher thrust ratings, and Welland-equipped Meteors were either re-engined or retired.

== Design and development ==
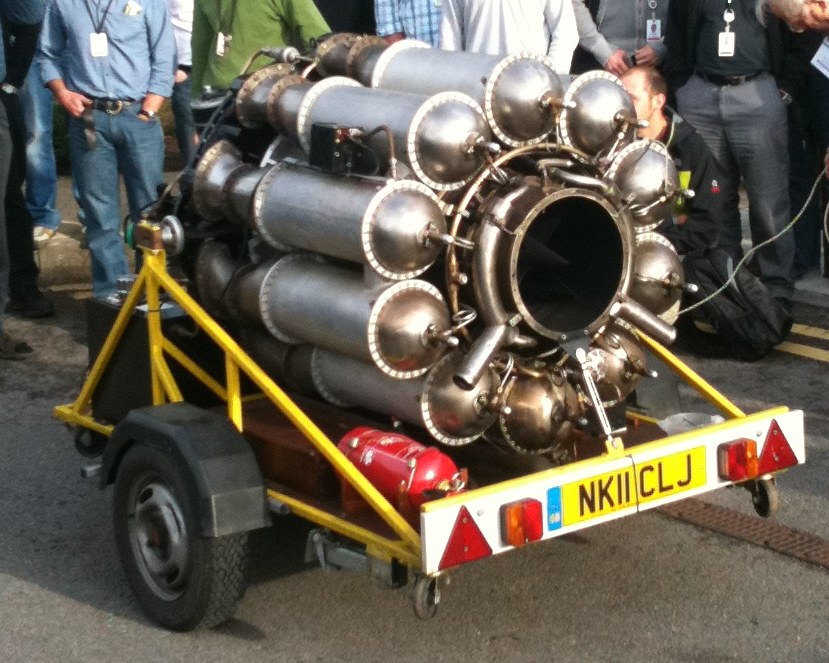
Demonstration run of the Welland by Terry Jones. This example is the oldest working jet engine in the world (restored by Aero Engines Carlisle)

The W.2 was a larger version of Whittle's early design, the Whittle Supercharger Type W.1, or W.1, which flew in 1941 in the Gloster E. 28/39 experimental testbed aircraft. The centrifugal compressor used a double-sided impeller. Both engines used Whittle's "reverse flow" design, in which the combustion chambers were placed around the turbine to produce a shorter engine. This required the heated air to flow forward before reversing its direction to pass through the single-stage axial-flow turbine. For the W.2, the impeller was 19 inches (480 mm) in diameter and there were ten combustion chambers. The front face of the turbine disc was cooled with air drawn in by an auxiliary fan. The engine weighed about 850 pounds (390 kilograms).

=== Problems and first flight test ===
The first examples produced by Rover had serious problems with surging and turbine blade failures. Maurice Wilks eliminated the surging by adding a 20-vane diffuser to the compressor. J.P. Herriot of the Air Inspection Department (A.I.D.) was sent to Rover to provide improved turbine materials, and the engine passed a 25-hour test at 1,250 lbf (5.6 kN) in November 1942. Meanwhile, the prototype Gloster F.9/40, soon to be known as the Meteor, was ready for flight, although the engines were not. Taxi tests were started by test pilot Gerry Sayer while waiting for flight-quality engines. The first flight-test of the engine took place on 9 August 1942, fitted in the tail of a Vickers Wellington bomber.

=== Rover/Rolls-Royce Deal ===
Whittle was constantly frustrated by Rover. He thought that there was an inability to deliver production-quality parts, and became increasingly vocal with his complaints. Whittle accused Rover of "tampering" with the design of the engine in order to avoid patent fees and enable Rover to claim the design as their own, whilst Rover's development work was proceeding at a slow pace. Rover was losing interest in the project after the delays and constant harassment from Whittle. Earlier, in 1940, Stanley Hooker of Rolls-Royce had met Whittle, and later introduced him to Ernest Hives. Rolls-Royce had a fully developed supercharger division, which Hooker directed, and which was naturally suited to jet engine work. Hives agreed to supply key parts to help the project along. Eventually, in early 1943, Spencer Wilks of Rover met Hives and Hooker for a dinner at the Swan & Royal Hotel, Clitheroe. By mutual agreement between the Minister of Aircraft Production and the Boards of Rover and Rolls-Royce, the Rover jet factory at Barnoldswick was exchanged for the Rolls-Royce Meteor tank engine factory in Nottingham. A handshake sealed the deal.

Rover handed over a total of 32 W.2B/23 engines to Rolls-Royce as well as four "straight-through" W.2B/26 engines, developed by Rover's Adrian Lombard. The W.2B/23 became the RB.23 Welland and the W.2B/26 became the RB.26 Derwent. Adrian Lombard moved with the engines from Rover to Rolls-Royce. Stanley Hooker helped in the task of ironing out the remaining problems, and things soon improved. A flight-quality /23 was fitted to a Gloster G.40, an updated version of the E.28 that had flown the W.1, and was flown by John Grierson on 1 March 1943. Starting in April, the ratings had been improved to 1,526 lbf (6.79 kN) thrust, and achieved 1,600 lbf (7.1 kN) on 7 May 1943. The prototype F.9/40 was finally fitted with 1,700 lbf (7.6 kN) engines and was flown by Michael Daunt on 24 July 1943.

=== Meteor testing ===
Two Wellands were installed in the first production Meteor Mk.1, Serial number EE210/G, (the "/G" signifying "Guard", meaning that the aircraft was to have an armed guard at all times while on the ground). It was test flown by Daunt on 12 January 1944. This Meteor was then sent to the US in exchange for a General Electric J31 (Power Jets W.1X)-powered Bell XP-59A Airacomet, RG362/G. The Meteor was first flown at Muroc Army Airfield by John Grierson on 15 April. Several test flights followed, and by December it had been shipped back to the UK.

Reheat development had started in the Pyestock section of the Royal Aircraft Establishment Engine Section in 1943. When the V-1 attacks started on London in 1944 flight tests were done using Welland engines (and Power Jets W2/700 engines) in a Meteor I. The attacks finished before the reheat could be used in action.

=== In service ===
Production of the Meteor continued, with EF211 to 229 and 230 through 244 entering service No. 616 Squadron RAF in May 1944. The Wellands were rated at 1,600 lbf (7.1 kN), with 180 hours between overhauls. The Jumo 004B, which entering service only a few weeks earlier, was rated at 1,984 lbf (8.83 kN), but required overhaul after 25–35 hours. Flying from RAF Manston near the English Channel, 616 Squadron first saw action against the V-1 flying bombs en route to London on 27 July 1944.

=== Production ===
From October 1943 a total of 167 Wellands were dispatched from the Rolls-Royce facility at Barnoldswick. By this point, Adrian Lombard's straight-through design, which became the Rolls-Royce Derwent, had proved more reliable and produced more thrust, and production of the Welland ended.

=== Turboprop-related work ===
In May 1944 a Welland engine was modified by adding a reduction gear to the front and connecting its slower output shaft to a dynamometer to measure shaft power. Further knowledge was gained in operating a turboprop engine when propellers were fitted to two Derwent engines (known as the Rolls-Royce RB.50 Trent) to power a Gloster Meteor aircraft.

== Specifications (Welland) ==
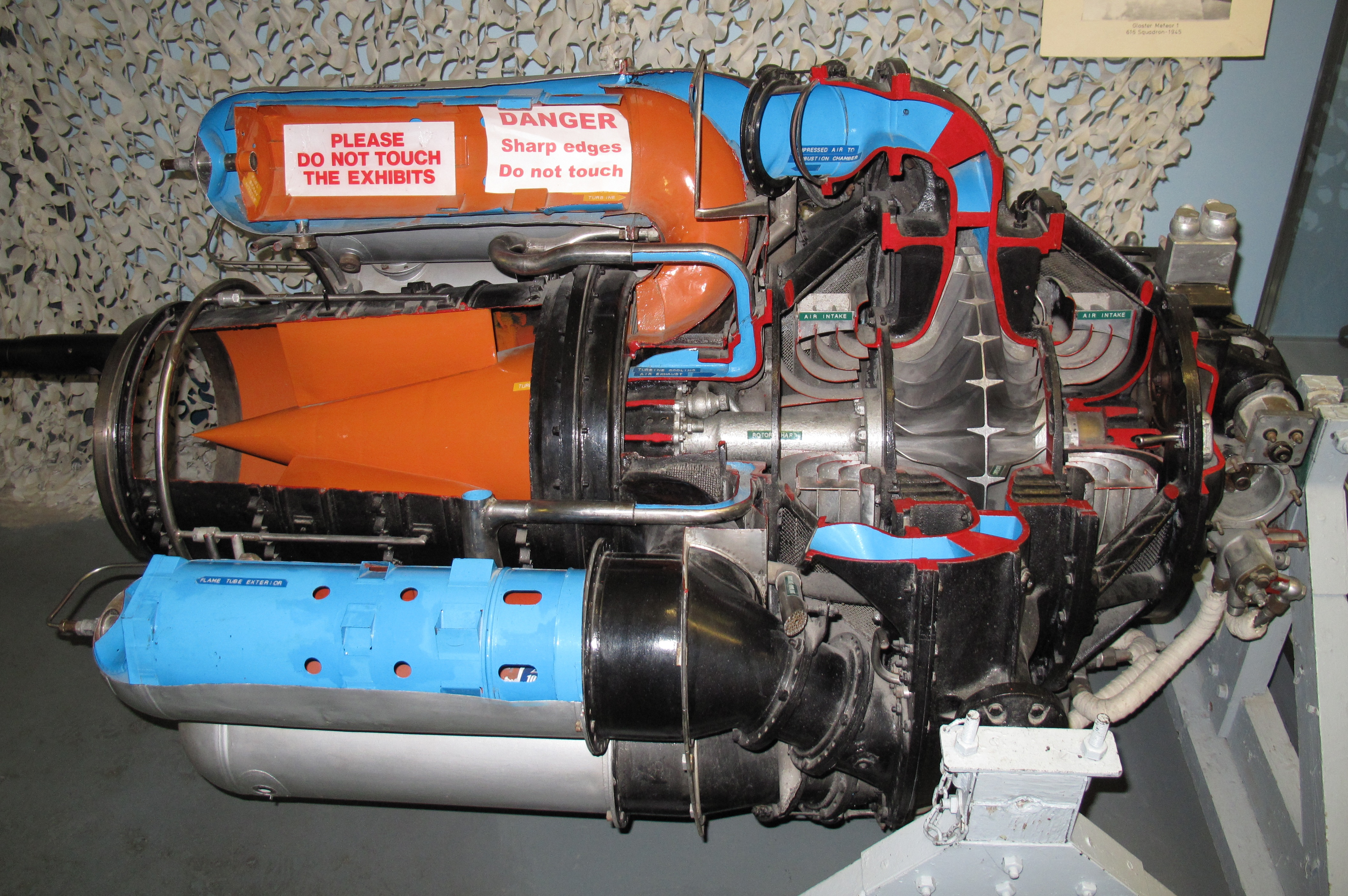
An example of the engine with parts cut away to show its workings

Data from

==== General characteristics ====
- Type: Centrifugal compressor turbojet
- Length: 62 in (1,575 mm)
- Diameter: 43 in (1,092 mm)
- Dry weight: 850 lb (386 kg)

==== Components ====
- Compressor: Single-stage double-sided centrifugal
- Combustors: 10 reverse-flow combustion chambers
- Turbine: Single-stage axial
- Fuel type: Kerosene
- Oil system: pressure feed, dry sump with scavenge cooling and filtration

==== Performance ====
- Maximum thrust: 1,600 lbf (7.1 kN) at 16,000 rpm.
- Turbine inlet temperature: 1,202 °F (650 °C)
- Specific fuel consumption: 1.1212 lb/lbf/hr (114.3 kg/kN/hr)
- Thrust-to-weight ratio: 1.887

== See also ==
- List of aircraft engines
