= Michael Daunt =

British test pilot (1909-1991)

Neill Michael Daunt OBE (23 October 1909 – 26 July 1991) was a British test pilot; the first person to fly the Gloster Meteor in March 1943, Britain's first production jet aircraft. He was the second person to fly the Gloster E.28/39 "Pioneer" (Britain's first jet aircraft) in November 1942. He had many severe accidents that he was lucky to survive, including one for which he had no recollection.

== Early life ==
Michael Daunt was born in Hastings.

His parents were married on January 27 1898, at St Pancras New Church on Euston Road, by Rev F A Bealey.

His father was a General Practitioner (GP). He was the son of William Daunt LRCP, who was born on December 22 1869, at Donnybrook, Dublin, the son of Francis Daunt. In 1901 his father lived at 51 Exmouth Street in Clerkenwell, later living at Parade House, at 39 George Street. His father died on the morning of Tuesday January 6 1920, aged 51.

His eldest brother Barry, born November 15 1898, was killed in World War 1, on September 22 1918, aged 19; he was a 2nd Lt in the Royal Sussex Regiment.

His mother Sarah Jane (Jeannie) Gould, died aged 90 in early April 1961. His mother was born on August 10 1870 in Dulwich; in 1939 she lived at 220 St Augustus Road in Bournemouth. His mother's father was from Warslow in Staffordshire, and his mother's mother was from East Harling in Norfolk.

His brother Major Brian Daunt (March 16 1900 - 1996), of the Royal Artillery, married Millicent Margaret Balfour (1912-2006) of Allemuir House in Colinton, south Edinburgh, the daughter of Alfred Stevenson Balfour, and the granddaughter of Sir James Balfour Paul, at Rosslyn Chapel on December 8 1938 by the Bishop of Edinburgh.

Brian had daughter Miranda on May 4 1941 in Warwickshire, who died on March 31 2023 in the US. Another daughter of Brian was born in early November 1943, when Brian was now a Lt-Col. Brian had a son Barry Balfour Daunt on January 11 1949, when a Brigadier and DSO, but his son died aged 5 on January 22 1954 in Malta, when a large block fell on his chest. Major-General Brian Daunt commanded Malta Command from 1953-56, being awarded the CB in the 1956 New Year Honours. Brian was head of the British Red Cross from 1957 to October 1966, and died on March 18 1996, aged 96. Brian's wife died on May 30 2006 in Greece, living with daughters Miranda and Nikki.

Michael was taught the violin, and attended to St Catharine's College, Cambridge where he studied engineering. He learnt to fly with the Cambridge University Air Squadron (CUAS).

== Career ==
He joined the RAF on a short service commission serving in 25 Squadron. He played rugby union for the RAF as a three-quarter back. He became a flying instructor for de Havilland at the de Havilland Flying School in 1935.

=== Hawker ===
He became a test pilot for Hawker Aircraft in 1935.

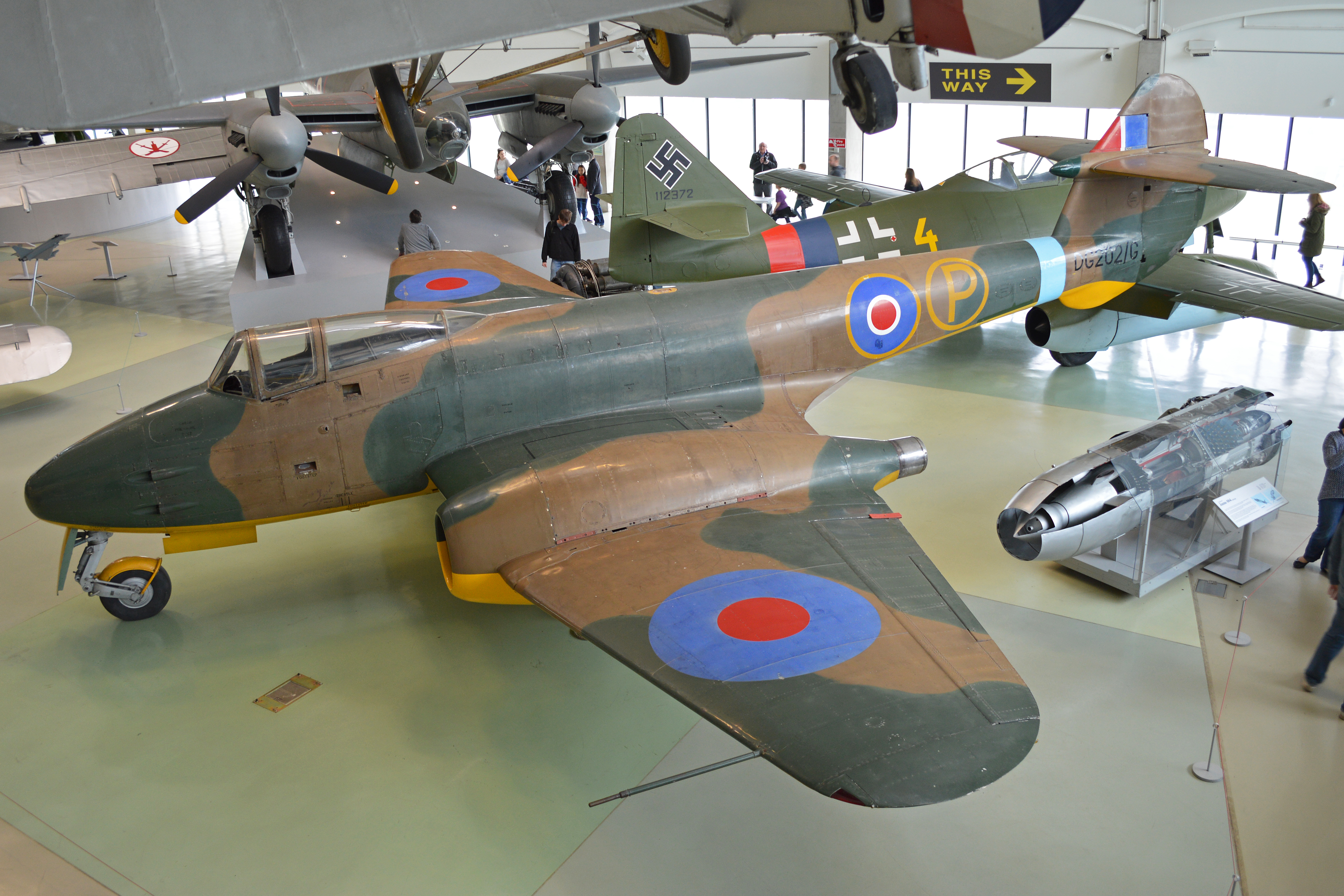
Meteor DG202, the second Meteor prototype with Power Jets engines, at the RAF Museum.

He flew Hawker Typhoon R7625 which crashed on 27 March 1942 near Gloucester, which ripped both wings off, between trees.

On 19 May 1942 from Staverton, he had a crash in the experimental Folland Fo.108 'P1777', an engine test-bed for the Bristol Centaurus, when the port tailplane spar failed. He went through the perspex canopy. He had no recollection of pulling the ripcord, and was nearly strangled to death by the harness, and crashed near Tewkesbury, being found unconscious in a cornfield by the local vicar, and was in hospital for six months. He regained his pilot licence in October 1942.

=== Gloster Aircraft ===
The early jet aircraft for Gloster were designed and built at the Bentham Works in Gloucestershire. He joined Gloster – owned by Hawker – in 1937 as Deputy Chief Test Pilot. He became Chief Test Pilot of Gloster in 1942 when the previous pilot, Gerry Sayer, was lost presumed killed in an accident flying a Hawker Typhoon on 21 October 1942. The Gloster Managing Director was Frank McKenna.

Most of his test flying took place at Brockworth, Gloucestershire. He flew the Gloster E.28/39 on 6 November 1942 at RAF Edgehill in Oxfordshire, near Shenington off the A422. He took the only known picture of the E.28/39 first flight in May 1941.

He retired from test flying in June 1944 when the Meteor he was flying had a full compressor failure in mid-air and he was lucky enough to have a safe landing.

=== Meteor first flight ===
On 3 February 1940, Gloster was given the contract for Britain's first F9/40 jet fighter, before any British jet aircraft had flown. On 7 February 1941, the Minister of Aircraft Production ordered twelve (reduced to eight later) Meteor prototypes. The twin engine design was chosen because the engines available were not powerful enough for a single-engine design.

On 27 January 1943 he was stood near Meteor 'DG206' and was sucked into the Meteor nacelle at Bentham; Richard Walker (engineer) was stood nearby, who made gestures at the technician in the cockpit to switch off the engines. Only his broad shoulders and 15 stone weight stopped him being killed. He was the first person to do this. Daunt was off work for two days.

The first Meteor (Gloster F9/40) prototype was moved to RAF Cranwell in Lincolnshire on 12 February 1943. On 5 March 1943 Daunt flew the Meteor, prototype DG206, on the Meteor's first flight. It was not fitted with Power Jets W.2 engines, but the de Havilland Halford H-1. The first flight lasted three and a half minutes, as the aircraft began to yaw violently from side to side. The de Havilland engines were almost twice as powerful as the other engines, and also heavier; this put much work on the undercarriage shock absorbers and brakes. The Meteor, with De Havilland engines, was wider. On the first flight, the Meteor took off after 1,200 yds.

The second flight of the Meteor was on 17 April 1943. He flew the first Meteor (DG205) powered by Power Jets jet engines on 12 June 1943. Another Meteor prototype, DG204, flew with the axial-flow Metropolitan-Vickers F.2 jet engine in November 1943, which was the fifth Meteor prototype, and the Metropolitan-Vickers (MetroVick) engines outperformed those of Power Jets. The highest speed of any Meteor prototype was 488 mph (785 km/h) at 10,000 feet (3,050 m). An order was made for 300 Meteors, but due to engine problems, this first order was reduced to 20 aircraft.

He flew Meteor 'W4041' fourteen times, and Meteor 'W4046' four times, between 16 and 20 April 1943. On 19 April 1943, he flew Meteor 'W4046' in front of Winston Churchill in Hertfordshire, in an 11-minute display. He flew with John Grierson (pilot).

Michael Daunt flew the first production (military) version of the Meteor Mk 1, equipped with four 20mm Hispano cannon, EE210/G, on 12 June 1944. The Meteor entered service in July 1944, with the Rolls-Royce Welland.

The Meteor would stay in production until 1954, with around 4,000 being made; with 3,600 made in the UK, mostly at Hucclecote and some at Baginton; and 330 were made in the Netherlands by Fokker, for the Dutch and Belgian air forces.

He returned to Cranwell in March 1983 for the anniversary, with Air Chief Marshal Sir Keith Williamson.

The Messerschmitt Me 262 V3 prototype first flew on 18 July 1942 at Leipheim with the Junkers Jumo 004 axial-flow jet engine, piloted by Fritz Wendel.

=== Farming ===
Michael Daunt became a farmer after the war in south-west Oxfordshire, close to what is today the M40 motorway.

From September 1955 he worked for a Warwickshire company. From March 1962 he worked for Bardahl Products Ltd of Bayswater. From 1969 to 1976 he was Chief Technician of the kidney unit of the Wordsley Hospital in Kingswinford.

== Personal life ==
He was awarded the OBE in the 1945 Birthday Honours for services to test flying.

He married Sheila Sigrist, the daughter of Frederick Sigrist (1884–1956) the Joint Managing Director of Hawker, in 1936 in London. Sheila Wiseman Sigrist lived at 'Wychwood' in Oxshott. Sheila was an adopted daughter.

His ex-wife Sheila remarried Antony John Fedden in Birmingham on September 27 1938. Sheila had a daughter on January 1 1941. Nigel, son of Anthony John Fedden, was killed by Herbert Stanley, when crossing the road aged 6, on New Road in Bromsgrove, and died on January 22 1954. Bromsgrove School, to this day, has the Nigel Fedden Progress Cup.

Sheila married again, to Peter Stevens, around October 1950. Sheila died on February 15 1985 in north Surrey.

After divorce, he married Elspeth Eliot Lloyd (born 31 March 1916), a member of the banking family, in 1940 at Chelsea Register Office. They had a son Michael Seton (1942–2023) who became a well-known writer on fishing and country matters. His wife had an affair with an assistant pilot, and he was given custody of their one child. He divorced Elspeth on Friday 20 April 1945, and she later married Alan Dipper of Beckley, East Sussex on 20 March 1948 in Stratford upon Avon. Elspeth lived at 'Cleavers', on Church Lane, in Welford-on-Avon. Elspeth was a friend of the actress Patience Collier. Elspeth had another son on 24 August 1949, and daughter Frances, who married John Richard Buckley, of Woldingham, on Saturday 4 September 1976 at St Mary's Church, Rye.

He married thirdly Monica Claire Parnell in 1947 in Ploughley Rural District, and they had a daughter on 5 November 1948 and a son on 10 June 1950. He lived at Pyrton, now in South Oxfordshire and then in Kent, South Wales, Hertfordshire, Devon and Oldbury in the West Midlands. In the 1980s he lived in Oldbury. His third wife Monica died in May 1989.

His son Michael married Rosamund Suzanne Hall of Pett in East Sussex, on 9 August 1969 at St Laurence's Church, Guestling.

He had broken his leg, when falling, and went into Sandwell General Hospital; after his leg had mended, his daughter brought him back to the family home in Ipswich. Although he never fully recovered, he was able to have the kind of death he wanted, with family around, on 26 July 1991; the funeral was in Ipswich on 2 August 1991.

Business positions
Preceded by Gerry Sayer	Chief Test Pilot of the Gloster Aircraft Company; 1942–1944	Succeeded by
Preceded by	Deputy Chief Test Pilot of the Gloster Aircraft Company; 1937–1942	Succeeded by
