= John Cuss =

British mechanical engineer (1906–1995)

John Freeman Cuss FRAeS FIMechE (May 1906 – 7 April 1995) was a British mechanical engineer who was one of the team at Gloster in the early 1940s that developed the first British jet aircraft that flew in May 1941, and later the Gloster Meteor.

== Early life ==
He was born in 1906 in Swindon, living at 2 Church Place in Swindon. From 1917 to 1919 he attended Bideford Grammar School (became Bideford College in 1972), then from 1919 to December 1922 another grammar school in Wiltshire. From January 1923 to May 1927 he attended The College in Swindon.

== Career ==
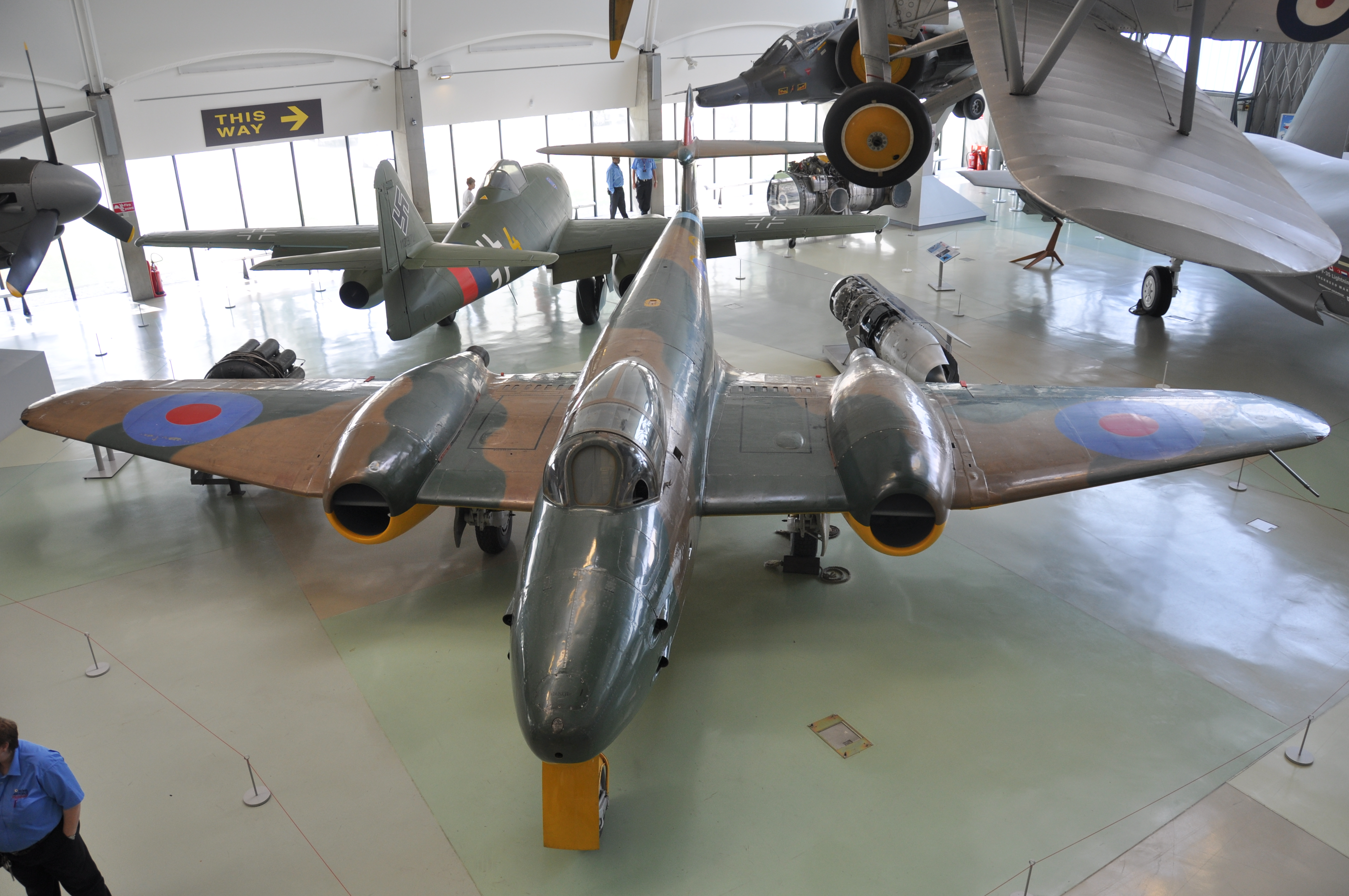
Gloster Meteor prototype DG202/G at the RAF Museum in July 2014

=== Great Western Railway ===
He started at the Swindon Works, serving a five-year apprenticeship from January 1923. He worked for a year in the design office.

=== Handley Page ===
He joined Handley Page in April 1929 as a junior draughtsman in north-west London.

=== Saunders Roe ===
From October 1932 to May 1934 he worked at Saunders-Roe on the design of flying boats.

=== Airspeed ===
From 1934 to 1935 he worked at Airspeed Ltd. in Hampshire.

=== Gloster Aircraft ===
He joined Gloster in August 1935.

He was responsible for the mechanical engineering structure (structural mechanics) of the first jet aircraft at Gloster. The Gloster design team was housed at the Bentham Works, where the first jet aircraft were tested. He later became head of the design office at Gloster. In 1951–52, as Chief Stressman, he investigated a series of in-flight structural failures of Meteor aircraft. His report on the cause of the failures was ridiculed by the government Accident Investigation Department at the Royal Aircraft Establishment (RAE) who were instructing redesigns based on their own analysis of the cause. Some months later, when the Structures Department at the RAE was briefed on the crashes, his theories were immediately accepted and the modifications he implemented reduced the accident rate from one in every 15,000 hours to one in every 80,000 hours.

In July 1966 he became a Fellow of the Royal Aeronautical Society. Records of his time at Gloster are found at the Gloucestershire Archives.

== Personal life ==
He was married on 7 June 1947 at Christ Church, Cheltenham by the Rt Rev Llewellyn Gwynne; his wife was the daughter of a Brigadier-General from Cheltenham. They had twin sons in 1948, a daughter on 5 June 1950 and another son in 1954. His daughter married in Cheltenham in 1971; a grandson was born in March 1973. His wife (born 20 June 1914) died in April 1984. His youngest son married in 1975 in Wales, with two grandsons born in 1976 and 1985, and a granddaughter in 1977.

His wife's sister married the film composer William Blezard in March 1954 in London; they had met when at the Royal College of Music (RCM).

In the late 1940s he was Secretary of the Gloucester & Cheltenham branch of the RAeS, when living at Great Witcombe.

On 1 December 1936 he gained his pilots licence at the Cotswold Aero Club, in a de Havilland Moth; around this time he was living in Wotton, Gloucester.

He died in Cheltenham on 7 April 1995. He lived off Hatherley Road, near the A40 Westal Green roundabout in the south of Cheltenham.

== See also ==
- Stuart Davies (engineer), designer of the Avro Vulcan, and a stress engineer on the Hawker Hurricane
