= Hawker Hornbill =

Hornbill
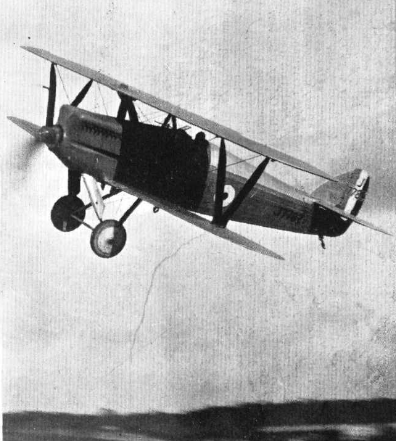

General information
- Type: Fighter
- Manufacturer: Hawker Aircraft
- Designer: George Carter
- Status: Prototype only
- Number built: One

History
- First flight: July 1925

The Hawker Hornbill was the last Hawker military aircraft designed under the direction of George Carter. The design was started in 1925 and the first flight took place in July 1925. The Hornbill did not achieve service in the Royal Air Force due to problems in its power plant and radiator. Only one aircraft was built.

== Development and design ==
In 1924, H.G. Hawker Engineering made a proposal to the British Air Ministry to build a new single-seat fighter powered by the Rolls-Royce Condor engine. As a result, the Air Ministry placed an order for a single prototype, drawing up Specification 7/24 to cover the aircraft. Many of the normal requirements included in fighter specifications were omitted with the hope of resulting in an aircraft with higher performance. The specification required a speed of 208 mph (335 km/h) at sea level and a service ceiling of 29,000 ft (8,800 m), with an armament of a single machine gun. The new design, named the Hawker Hornbill, was produced under the supervision of Hawker's Chief Designer W. G. Carter, shortly before he resigned and was replaced in his role by Sydney Camm. (Note: The Hornbill is often stated to have been designed by Camm - this can be attributed to a report in Flight magazine of 1 July 1926, that was corrected two weeks later.'"`UNIQ--ref-0000000E-QINU`"')

The Hornbill was a single-bay biplane of mixed metal and wood construction. The front fuselage structure and engine mount was made of steel tube, and was covered with duralumin cladding, while the fuselage from the cockpit rearwards had a wooden structure with fabric covering. The wings had spruce spars and ribs and were also covered in fabric. The water-cooled Rolls-Royce Condor engine was tightly coweled to minimise drag, and drove a two bladed propeller (initially a fine-pitch Watts). The engine was cooled by a pair of semi-circular radiators beneath the lower wings. The pilot sat in an open cockpit behind the engine and fuel and oil tanks, with a cut-out in the upper wing trailing edge to improve his view. A single Vickers machine gun could be mounted low on the port side of the fuselage.

== Testing ==
The prototype, powered by a 650 hp (480 kW) Condor III engine, made its first flight in the summer of 1925 with F. P. Raynham at the controls, probably early in July that year. (Note: The Hornbill was certainly flying by August 1925, when it was photographed by a photographer from Flight magazine, but these photographs were embargoed until next year, leading to frequent statements that the Hornbill first flew in May 1926.'"`UNIQ--ref-00000019-QINU`"') The Condor III engine was not compatible with Synchronization gear so the gun was not fitted. Test pilot duties soon passed to George Bulman, who reported that performance was disappointing. As a result, the propeller was replaced by a coarser-pitch metal Fairey-Reed propeller, but this had little effect. Another problem was that the engine suffered from over-cooling, with part of the radiators blanked off as a result.

In February 1926, the Hornbill was returned to Hawker's works at Kingston-on-Thames for modifications to be made. The engine was replaced by a 698 hp (520 kW) Condor IV fitted under a modified, longer, cowling, while the two radiators were replaced by a single semicircular radiator under the fuselage, and the fin and rudder were modified, giving a slightly larger area. The modified prototype returned to flight in May 1926, and was displayed at the RAF Display at Hendon Aerodrome in July that year. The aircraft was then sent to RAF Martlesham Heath for testing and service trials. While the aircraft was much faster than the contemporary Armstrong-Whitworth Siskin at low altitudes, performance dropped off above 15,000 ft (4,600 m) and the aircraft's ceiling was well below the 29,000 ft (8,800 m) required by the specification. Handling at high speeds was poor, with the aircraft lacking stability. At 150 mph (240 km/h) or above, steep turns could not be made without applying full rudder. Engine overheating occurred during flight tests, which may have been a result of using normal service fuel for extended high power runs. The cockpit was extremely cramped, with it not being possible for the pilot to reach the machine gun's cocking handle or the aircraft's compass or map case, while escape from the cockpit by parachute was considered to be difficult. The type was considered to be unsuitable for use as an interceptor, with Hugh Trenchard, the Chief of the Air Staff claiming that "...for war it would be practically useless".

The Air Ministry transferred the prototype Hornbill to the Royal Aircraft Establishment, where it was used as a testbed, being fitted with leading-edge slats on the upper wing, and undergoing extensive evaluation of its stability at and below the aircraft's stall speed. The aircraft completed its final trials in November 1932, and flew for the last time on 18 May 1933.

== Specifications (Hornbill) ==
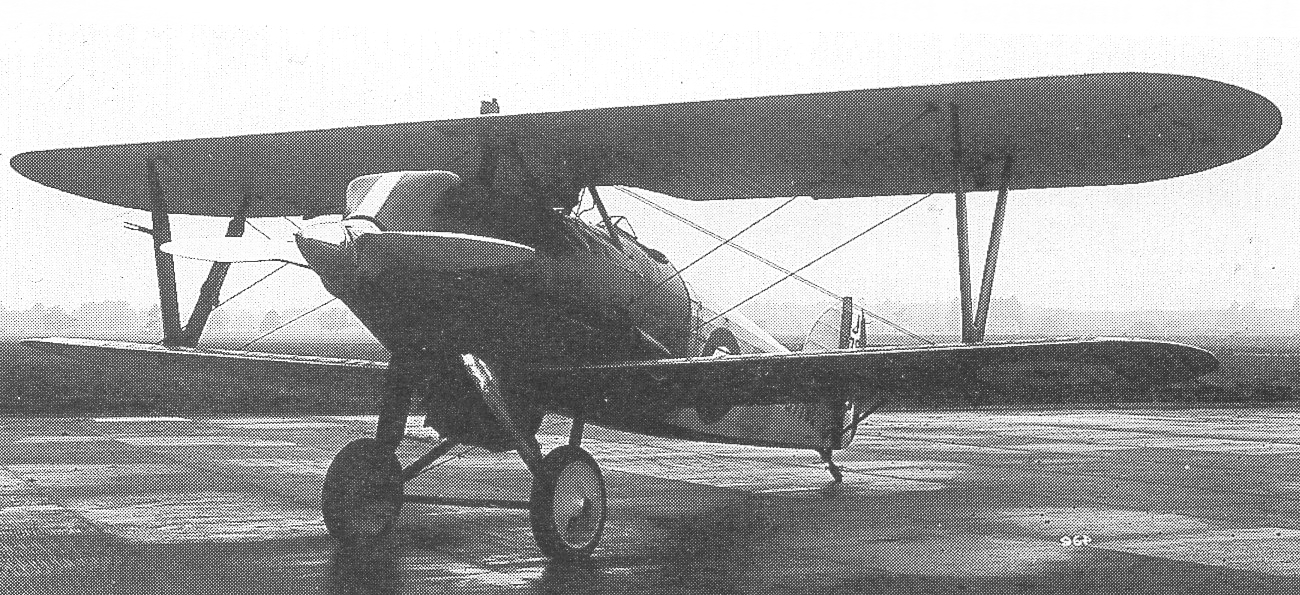
Hawker Hornbill

Data from The Complete Book of Fighters

General characteristics

- Crew: 1
- Length: 26 ft 7 1/4 in (8.11 m)
- Wingspan: 31 ft 0 in (9.45 m)
- Height: 9 ft 8 in (2.95 m)
- Wing area: 317.4 sq ft (29.49 m^{2})
- Airfoil: AD1
- Empty weight: 2,975 lb (1,349 kg)
- Gross weight: 3,769 lb (1,710 kg)
- Max takeoff weight: 3,820 lb (1,733 kg) (overload)
- Fuel capacity: 57 imp gal (68 US gal; 260 L)
- Powerplant: 1 × Rolls-Royce Condor IV water cooled V12 engine, 698 hp (520 kW)

Performance

- Maximum speed: 187 mph (301 km/h, 162 kn) at sea level
- Range: 200 mi (320 km, 170 nmi)
- Service ceiling: 22,700 ft (6,900 m)
- Time to altitude: 6 min 30 s to 10,000 ft (3,000 m)

Armament

- Guns: 1 × .303 in (7.7 mm) Vickers machine gun

== Bibliography ==
- Green, William; Swanborough, Gordon (2001) [1994]. The Complete Book of Fighters: An Illustrated Encyclopaedia of every Fighter Aircraft Built and Flown (Rev. ed.). London: Salamander Books. ISBN 1-84065-269-1.
- Jarrett, Philip (September 1985). "The Hornbill Enigma". Aeroplane Monthly. Vol. 13, no. 9. pp. 468–472. ISSN 0143-7240.
- Jarrett, Philip (October 1985). "The Hornbill Enigma (part two)". Aeroplane Monthly. Vol. 13, no. 10. pp. 534–538. ISSN 0143-7240.
- Mason, Francis (1991). Hawker Aircraft since 1920 (3rd ed.). London: Putnam. ISBN 0-85177-839-9.
- Mason, Francis (1992). The British Fighter since 1912. Annapolis, Maryland, US: Naval Institute Press. ISBN 1-55750-082-7.
