= Gloster E.28/39 =

British jet-engined aircraft, first flown in 1941

E.28/39
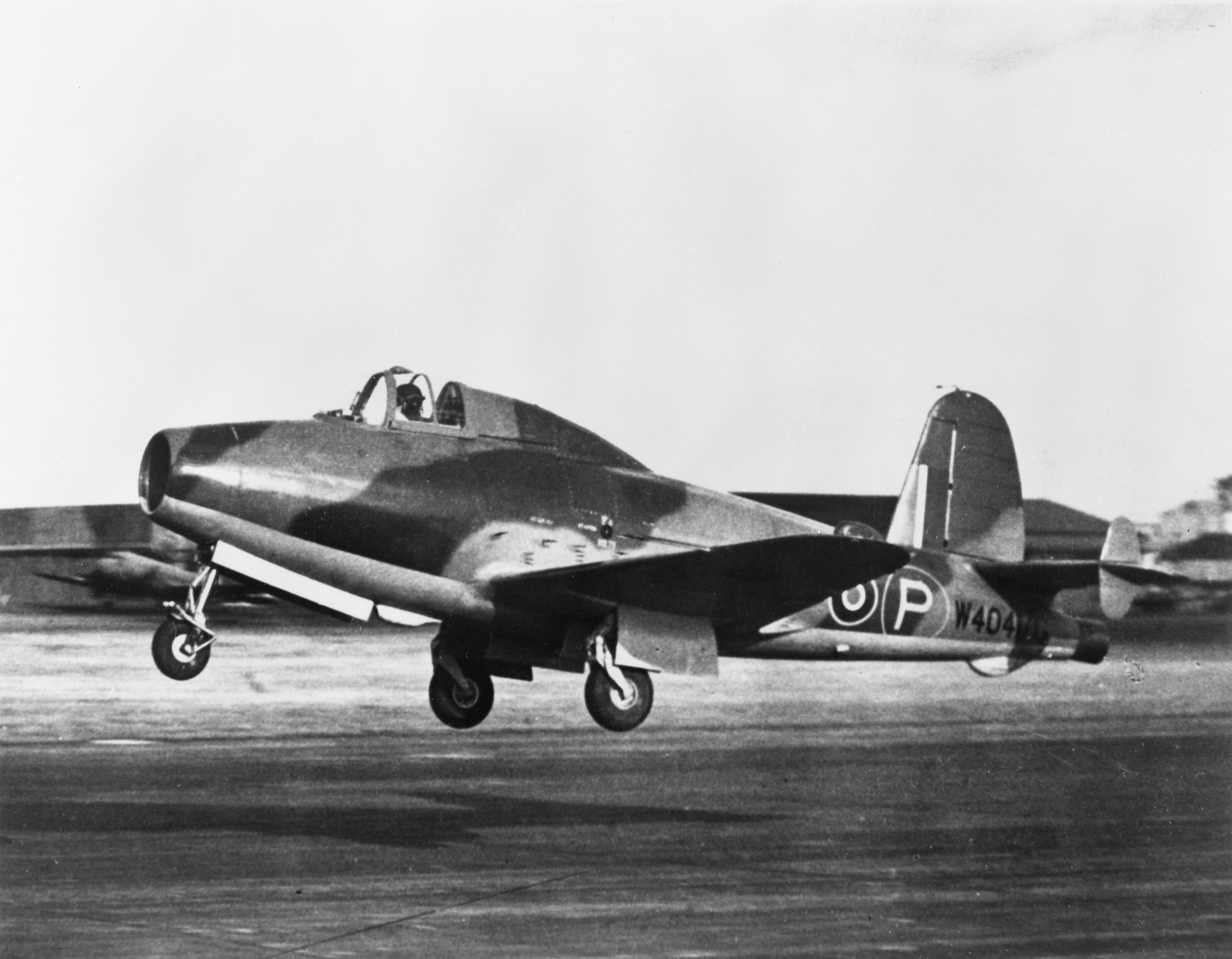
- The first E.28/39 prototype W4041/G

General information
- Type: Experimental prototype
- National origin: United Kingdom
- Manufacturer: Gloster Aircraft Company
- Designer: George Carter
- Status: Retired
- Primary user: Royal Aircraft Establishment (RAE)
- Number built: 2 prototypes

History
- First flight: 15 May 1941

The Gloster E.28/39, (also referred to as the Gloster Whittle, Gloster Pioneer, or Gloster G.40) was the first British turbojet-engined aircraft, first flying in 1941. It was the third turbojet aircraft to fly after the German Heinkel He 178 (1939) and Heinkel He 280 (1941).

The E.28/39 was the product of a specification which had been issued by the Air Ministry for a suitable aircraft to test the novel jet propulsion designs that Frank Whittle had been developing during the 1930s. Gloster and the company's chief designer, George Carter, worked with Whittle to develop an otherwise conventional aircraft fitted with a Power Jets W.1 turbojet engine. Flying for the first time on 15 May 1941, two E.28/39 aircraft were produced for the flight test programme. Following initial satisfactory reports, these aircraft continued to be flown to test increasingly refined engine designs and new aerodynamic features. Despite the loss of the second prototype, due to improper maintenance causing a critical aileron failure, the E.28/39 was considered to be a success.

The E.28/39 contributed valuable initial experience with the new type of propulsion and led to the development of the Gloster Meteor, the first operational jet fighter to enter service with the Allies. The first prototype continued test flying until 1944, after which it was withdrawn from service; in 1946, it was transferred to the Science Museum in London, where it has been on static display ever since; full-scale replicas have been created.

== Development ==
=== Background ===
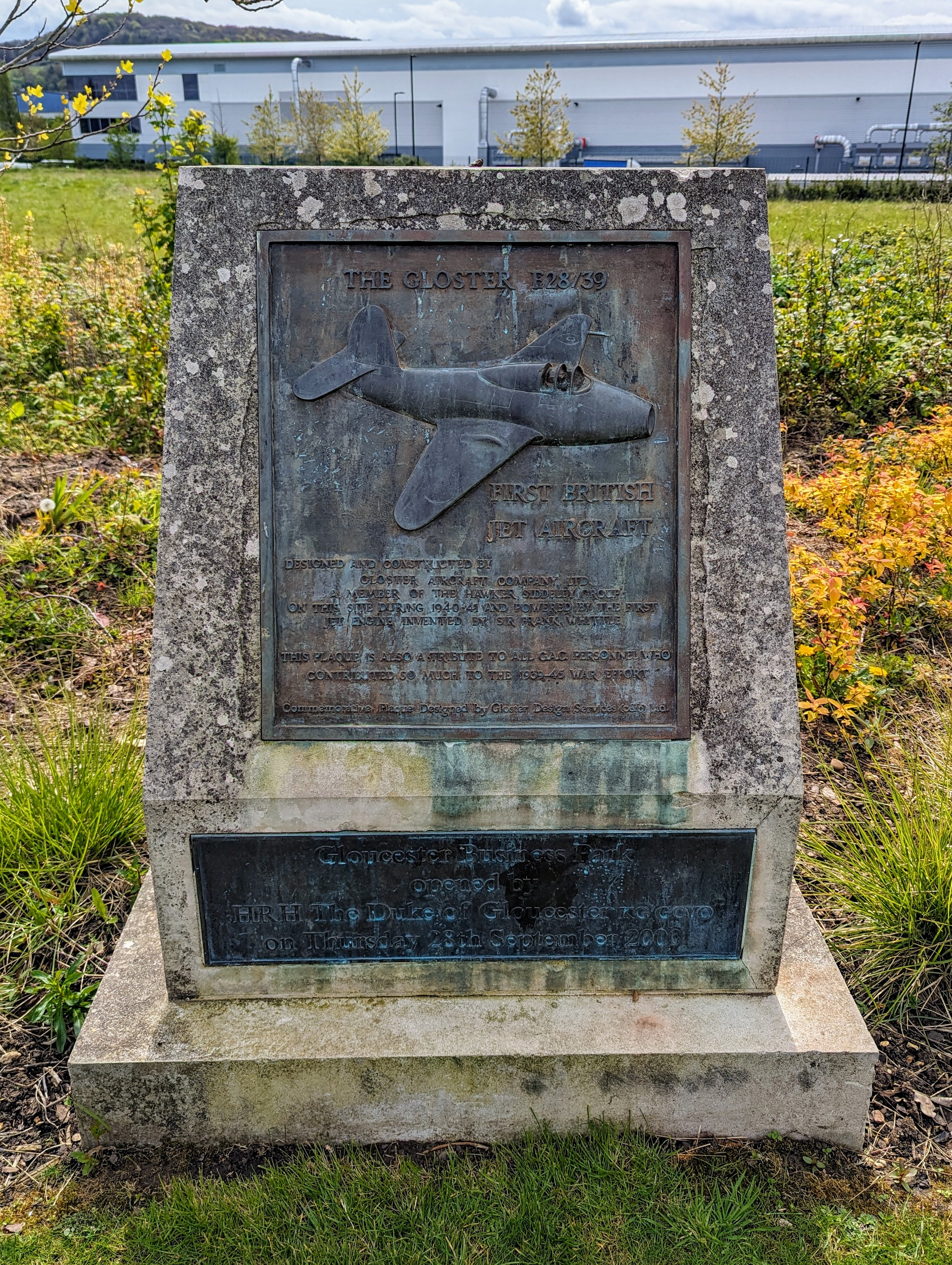
Plaque to the Gloster E28/39

The development of the turbojet-powered E.28/39 was the product of a collaboration between the Gloster Aircraft Company and Sir Frank Whittle's firm, Power Jets Ltd. Whittle formed Power Jets Ltd in March 1936 to develop his ideas of jet propulsion, Whittle himself serving as the company's chief engineer. For several years, attracting financial backers and aviation firms prepared to take on Whittle's radical ideas was difficult; in 1931, Armstrong-Siddeley had evaluated and rejected Whittle's proposal, finding it to be technically sound but at the limits of engineering capability. Securing funding was a persistently worrying issue throughout the early development of the engine. The first Whittle prototype jet engine, the Power Jets WU, began running trials in early 1937; shortly afterwards, both Sir Henry Tizard, chairman of the Aeronautical Research Committee, and the Air Ministry gave the project their support.

On 28 April 1939, Whittle made a visit to the premises of the Gloster Aircraft Company, where he met several key figures, such as George Carter, Gloster's chief designer. Carter took a keen interest in Whittle's project, particularly when he saw the operational Power Jets W.1 engine; Carter quickly made several rough proposals of various aircraft designs powered by the engine. Independently, Whittle had also been producing several proposals for a high-altitude jet-powered bomber; following the start of the Second World War and the Battle for France, a greater national emphasis on fighter aircraft arose. Power Jets and Gloster quickly formed a mutual understanding around mid-1939.

In September 1939, the Air Ministry issued a specification to Gloster for an aircraft to test one of Frank Whittle's turbojet designs in flight. The E.28/39 designation originates from the aircraft having been developed in conformance with the 28th "Experimental" specification issued by the Air Ministry in 1939. The E.28/39 specification required the aircraft to carry two 0.303 in (7.62 mm) Browning machine guns in each wing, along with 2,000 rounds of ammunition, but these were never fitted. The second paragraph of the contract for the first aeroplane stated: "The primary object of this aeroplane will be to flight test the engine installation, but the design shall be based on requirements for a fixed gun interceptor fighter as far as the limitations of size and weight imposed by the power unit permit. The armament equipment called for in this specification will not be required for initial trials but the contractor will be required to make provision in the design for the weight and space occupied by these items..."

=== Design effort ===
Early on, Gloster's chief designer, George Carter, worked closely with Whittle, and laid out a small low-wing aircraft of conventional configuration. The jet intake was located in the nose, while the single tail-fin and elevators were mounted above the jet-pipe, although due to uncertainty about the spinning characteristics of a jet aircraft, at an earlier design stage an alternative arrangement using twin fins and rudders was considered. Two jet pipe/rear fuselage arrangements were also originally considered, a normal fuselage with long jet-pipe and exhaust nozzle behind the tail, and a short fuselage and jet-pipe with the tail-plane supported on an extension boom. Flanagan highlights the advantage of a short jet-pipe as incurring a lower thrust loss. Buttler reports Gloster engineer Richard Walker considered a short fuselage would overcome structural, accessibility and maintenance difficulties and increase the maximum speed of the aircraft. Due to the unknown effects of the jet efflux on the boom-mounted tailplane, the long fuselage was selected. On 3 February 1940, a contract for two prototypes was signed by the Air Ministry.

Manufacture of the E.28/39 commenced at Brockworth near Gloucester and then moved to Regent Motors in Regent Street, Cheltenham (now the site of Regent Arcade), which was considered safer from bombing. Whittle was dissatisfied with the slowness of production, probably caused by the Battle of Britain as the area around nearby Coventry was subject to high levels of German bomber activity. In April 1941, the first of the E.28/39 prototypes was completed but a flight-worthy W.1A engine was not available and a ground-use only W.1X unit was assembled and installed for taxiing tests only.

While only two prototypes had been ordered, the operational philosophy was that, once the prototypes had proved the capabilities of the design, a more substantial programme would begin: even before the first flight of the E.28/39, this aircraft had been envisaged as being a considerably more elaborate twin-engined design, with all of the equipment required in a fighter aircraft. This aircraft, also produced by Gloster, became the Meteor, the first production jet-propelled aircraft to enter service with the Allies.

== Design ==
The E.28/39 was a low-wing monoplane designed around the new jet engine. It was described as possessing a slightly tubby appearance as a result of a round fuselage. Due to the elimination of any risk that would have been posed by propeller tips striking the ground, the E.28/39 had an unusually short undercarriage for the era. It had a retractable undercarriage which was actuated by a hydraulic accumulator, with a hand pump to serve as a backup. Emergency actuation used compressed air. The flaps were also hydraulically actuated, using the hand-pump. Unusually, the nose wheel was steerable, using the rudder control, which aided in ground manoeuvring.

The E.28/39 was powered by a Power Jets W.1 turbojet engine behind the pilot and the fuel tank. The engine exhaust was directed through the centre of the fuselage, the jetpipe terminating about two feet behind the rudder. A nose air-intake led the air through bifurcated ducts around the cockpit. A fuel tank, containing up to 82 Imp gal (372.8 litres), was behind the cockpit, supposed to have been adopted as a countermeasure against the impact of negative g, which posed the risk of causing the engine to flame out, which was hard to re-light during flight.

The E.28/39 lacked features that would be expected for a fighter, such as a radio. The original engine was started using an Austin Seven car engine, connected by a flexible drive; it was replaced on the flight engine with an electric starter that used a ground-cart battery. The cockpit, which had a sliding canopy, had no pressurisation or any form of climate control, such as heating.Pilots were intended to wear electrically heated flight suits but the lack of a generator and limited battery capacity, the latter being devoted to the automated sensors and recording devices that captured the results of each flight, meant this was not possible; pilots had to endure the cold cockpit.

John Grierson said:

"The main impressions of my first jet-propelled flight were first of the simplicity of operation. The throttle was the only engine control; there were no mixture or propeller levers, supercharger or cooling-gill controls and the fuel system had simply one low-pressure valve between the tank and the engine pump, and one high-pressure valve between the pump and the engine. There was no electric booster pump. Secondly the absence of vibration or the sensation of effort being transmitted to the pilot's seat was outstanding."

and

"The very favourable impressions of jet propulsion obtained ... have all been endorsed by subsequent flights ... The E.28 is a most pleasant little aeroplane to handle, particularly on account of the excellent field of vision from the pilot's seat ...."

== Testing ==
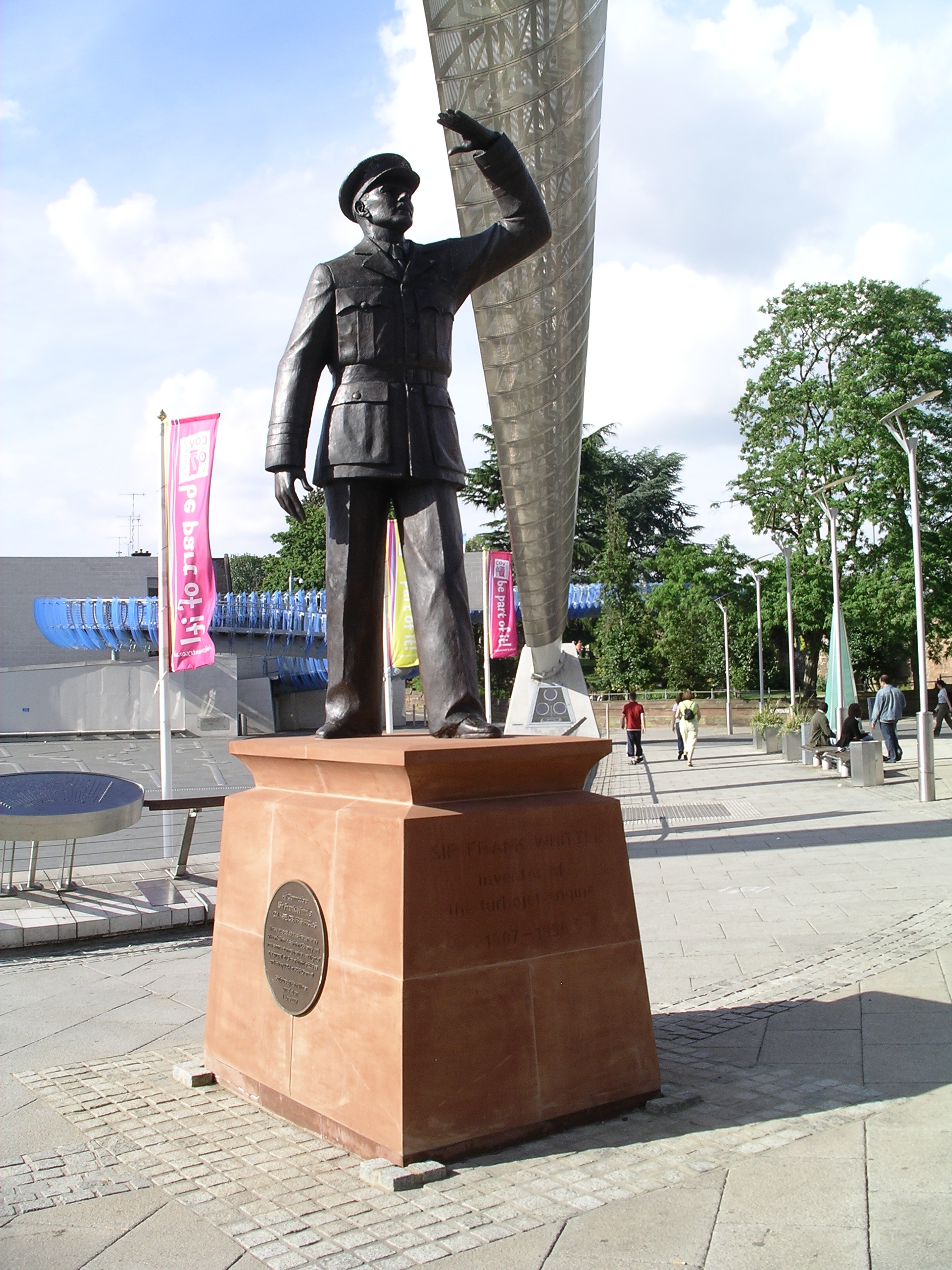
Statue in Coventry, England of Sir Frank Whittle observing the first British jet-powered flight

Although the initial flight tests were relatively early in the Second World War, the German Heinkel He 178 had been first test-flown on 27 August 1939, at Rostock-Marienehe on the Baltic Coast, days before the outbreak of the war.

The E.28/39 was delivered to Brockworth for ground tests beginning on 7 April 1941, using a non-flightworthy version of the Power Jets W.1 engine. Frank Whittle, who had been an RAF flying instructor and test pilot before specializing in engineering, did taxi runs on the grass airfield up to 60 mph (97 km/h) and Gloster's Chief Test Pilot, Flight Lieutenant Gerry Sayer did further taxi tests before becoming airborne for 200 to 300 yd (180 to 270 m), which he repeated two more times.

Following the completion of these ground tests, the aircraft was fitted with a flightworthy engine rated for 10 hours use, and then partially dismantled and transported to RAF Cranwell, near Sleaford in Lincolnshire which had a long runway and no high ground in the vicinity. On 15 May 1941, Gerry Sayer flew the aircraft under jet power for the first time, in a flight lasting 17 minutes. In this first series of test flights, a maximum true speed of 350 mph (560 km/h) was attained, in level flight at 25,000 ft (7,600 m) and 17,000 turbine revolutions per minute. Tests continued with increasingly refined versions of the engine. Small, auxiliary fins were added near the tips of the tailplanes to provide additional stability in high-speed flight. John Grierson, in 1971, called these "end-plates" and wrote that their purpose was to increase the fin area due to the problem of rudder blanking in a side-slip. On 21 October 1942, Sayer disappeared during a flight in a Hawker Typhoon, presumed killed in a collision and his assistant, Michael Daunt, took over testing of the E.28/39. (Note: Blackburn says Sayer was practising attacks and presumed to have collided with other aircraft) The oil system had been changed before he flew: after it was proven, the aircraft then being handed over to the RAE for testing by service pilots.

The second prototype E.28/39 (W4046) – initially powered by a Power Jets W.2 engine – joined the test programme on 1 March 1943. Flying of W4046 was by Gloster test pilots John Grierson and John Crosby Warren, because Michael Daunt was then involved with the F.9/40 (which would enter service as the Gloster Meteor). Testing revealed problems with engine oil and lubricants. In April 1943, W4046 flew to Hatfield for a demonstration in front of the Prime Minister and members of the Air Staff. It was taken to Farnborough and fitted with a 1,500 lbf (6.7 kN) W2.B and achieved 466 mph. On 30 July 1943, while on a high-altitude test flight, the second prototype was destroyed in a crash resulting from an aileron failure. The accident was attributed to the use of the wrong type of grease in the aileron controls; one aileron was "stuck in position, sending the aircraft out of control". The test pilot, Squadron Leader Douglas Davie, bailed out from 33,000 ft (10,000 m), suffering frostbite on the way down.

The first prototype was fitted with the 1,700 lbf (7.6 kN) thrust W2/500 and was flown to 42,000 ft (13,000 m), but level speed at altitude was not attempted, due to fuel shortage. The pilot commented in his report on a need for cockpit heating and a larger fuel tank. The aircraft continued flight tests until 1944. By that time, more advanced turbojet-powered aircraft were available. The Gloster E.28/39 was later able to achieve high speeds, the highest being 505 mph (813 km/h) at 30,000 ft (9,100 m) with a W.2/700 engine and it proved to be a useful experimental aircraft with a "good climb rate and ceiling". Experience with the E.28/39 paved the way for Britain's first operational jet fighter aircraft, the Gloster Meteor. The Meteor was powered by two Rolls-Royce Welland engines, which was the next stage in development from the Power Jets W.1.

== Surviving aircraft ==
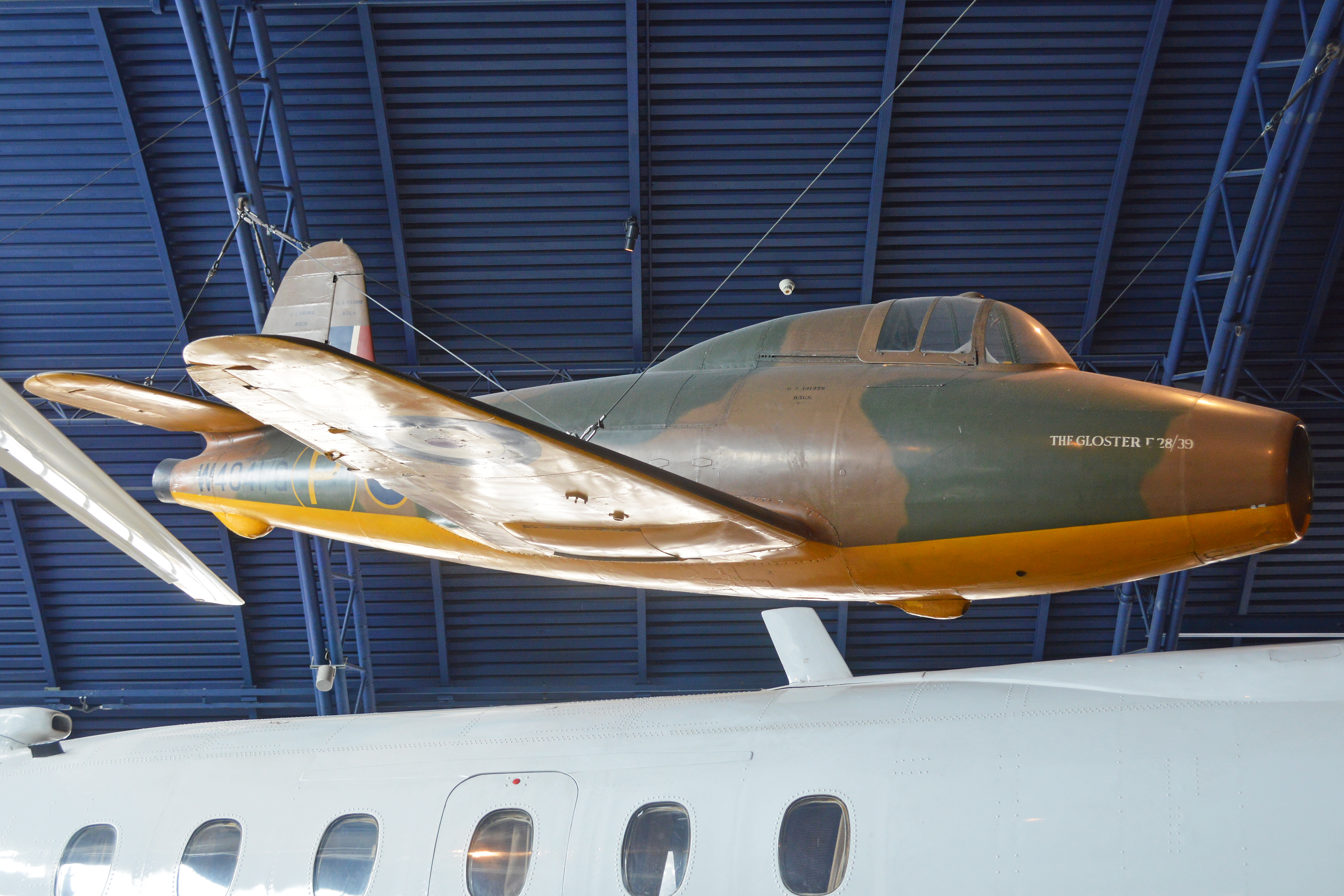
W4041 at the Science Museum in 2015

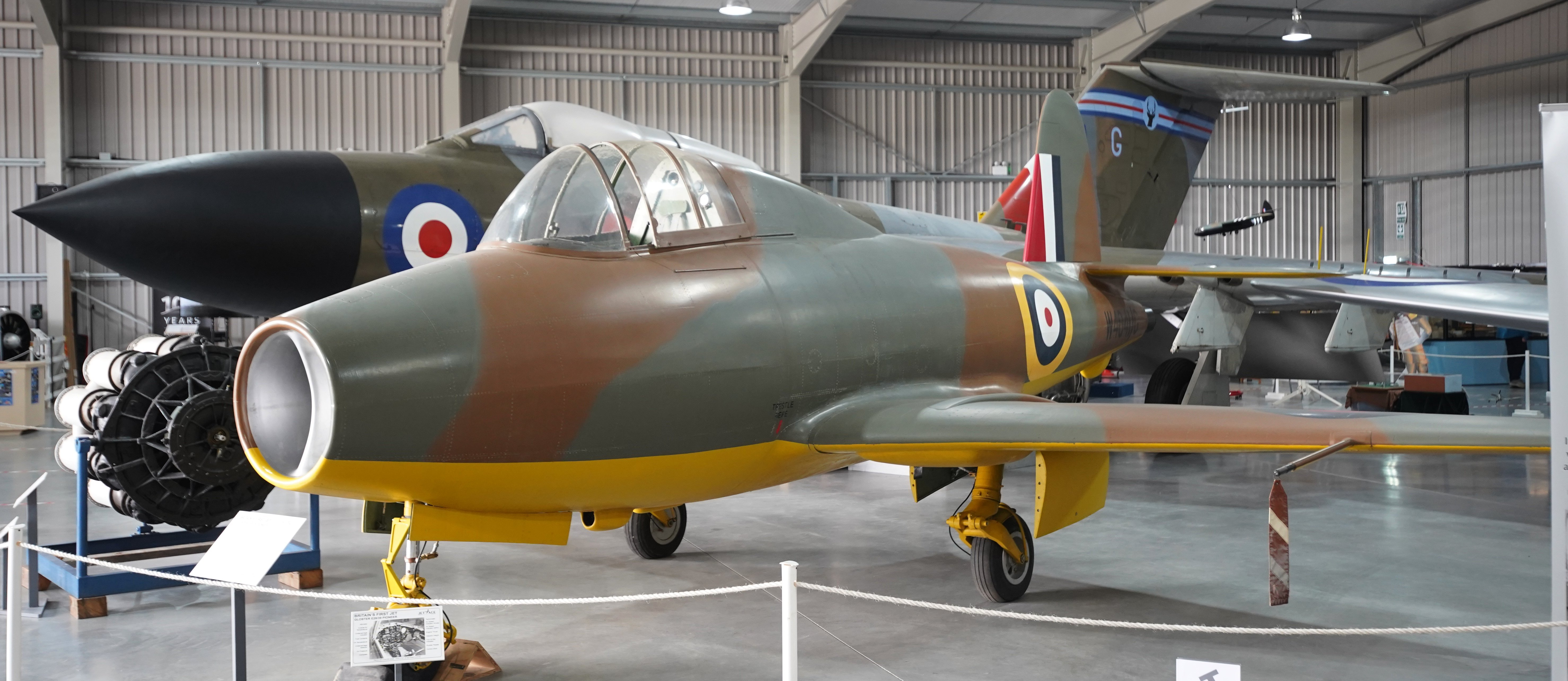
Full-scale model at the Jet Age Museum

In 1946, the first prototype (W4041) was placed in the Science Museum in Central London, where it is exhibited today in the Flight Gallery. A full-size replica has been placed on an obelisk on a roundabout near the northern perimeter of Farnborough Airfield in Hampshire, as a memorial to Sir Frank Whittle. A similar full-size model is on display in the middle of a roundabout at Lutterworth in Leicestershire, where the aircraft's engine was produced.

A full-scale model taken from the same moulds, with authentic paint scheme and detailing, has been built by members of the Jet Age Museum in Gloucestershire. It has been on display in Brockworth, Gloucester, Kemble (at both the Kemble Air Day and the MVT Show), and formed part of the display for the Sir Frank Whittle Centenary commemorations at RAF Cranwell in June 2007.

== Operators ==
United Kingdom

- Royal Aircraft Establishment

== Specifications (Gloster E.28/39 with W.2/500 engine) ==

Data from Gloster Aircraft since 1917

General characteristics

- Crew: 1
- Length: 25 ft 3.75 in (7.7153 m)
- Wingspan: 29 ft 0 in (8.84 m)
- Height: 9 ft 3 in (2.82 m)
- Wing area: 146.5 sq ft (13.61 m^{2})
- Aspect ratio: 5.75
- Airfoil: NACA 23012 (12% root: 9% tip) or root: EC(12.5)40/0640; tip: EC1040/0640 (Note: There were two sets of wings built, both of which were flown at various times)
- Empty weight: 2,886 lb (1,309 kg)
- Gross weight: 3,748 lb (1,700 kg)
- Fuel capacity: 81 imp gal (97 US gal; 370 L)
- Powerplant: 1 × Power Jets W.2/500 centrifugal flow turbojet engine, 1,760 lbf (7.8 kN) thrust

Performance

- Maximum speed: 466 mph (750 km/h, 405 kn) at 10,000 ft (3,000 m)
- Landing speed: 86 mph (75 kn; 138 km/h)
- Range: 410 mi (660 km, 360 nmi)
- Endurance: 56 minutes
- Service ceiling: 32,000 ft (9,800 m)
- Rate of climb: 1,063 ft/min (5.40 m/s)
- Time to altitude: 10,000 ft (3,000 m) in 22 minutes
- Thrust/weight: 0.21

Armament

- Guns: None fitted but provision for four 0.303 in (7.7 mm) Browning machine guns

== See also ==
External videos
- Period United News broadcast, officially revealing the existence of the E.28/39
- Compilation of footage, showing the fitting of the engine, rolling out and take-off of the aircraft along with several fly pasts
- Report by the Army Pictorial Service on the E.28/39

- Bell P-59A – first US turbojet fighter
- Gloster E.1/44 – Gloster's third turbojet aircraft
- Gloster Meteor – only operational British turbojet fighter in the Second World War.
- Heinkel He 178 – world's first turbojet aircraft.
- Heinkel He 280 – world's first turbojet fighter (did not enter service)
- Lockheed P-80 Shooting Star – first US operational turbojet fighter.
- Messerschmitt Me 262 – world's first operational turbojet fighter.

Related lists

- List of jet aircraft of World War II

== Bibliography ==
- Blackburn, Robert J. (1949). "No Airscrew Necessary..." Flight. Archived from the original on 6 November 2019.
- Buttler, Tony (2004). British Secret Projects Fighters and Bombers 1935-1950. Midland. ISBN 1-85780-179-2.
- "Britain's Turbine Aircraft". Flight. 1951.
- Flanagan, William A. (2017). Aviation Records in the Jet Age: The Planes and Technologies Behind the Breakthroughs. Specialty Press. ISBN 1-58007-230-5..
- Golley, John; Gunston, Bill (2010). Jet. Eloy Gutierrez. ISBN 1-907472-00-2.
- Grierson, John (1971). "Britain's First Jet Aeroplane". Flight International. Archived from the original on 6 March 2016.
- Jackson, Robert (2007). Britain's Greatest Aircraft. Pen and Sword. ISBN 1-84415-600-1.
- James, Derek N. (1987). Gloster Aircraft since 1917. London: Putnam. ISBN 0-85177-807-0.
- Mondey, David (1994). The Hamlyn Concise Guide to British Aircraft of World War II. London: Chancellor Press. ISBN 1-85152-668-4.
- Morgan, Eric B. "A New Concept of Flight". Twentyfirst Profile. 1 (8). New Milton. ISSN 0961-8120.
- Pavelec, Michael (2007). The Jet Race and the Second World War. Westport, Connecticut: Greenwood Publishing. ISBN 0-275-99355-8..
- Swanborough, Gordon (1997). British Aircraft at War, 1939–1945. East Sussex, UK: HPC Publishing. ISBN 0-9531421-0-8.
- Winchester, Jim (2005). X-Planes and Prototypes. London: Amber Books. ISBN 1-904687-40-7.
