= Bentham Works =

Gloster Aircraft Company site

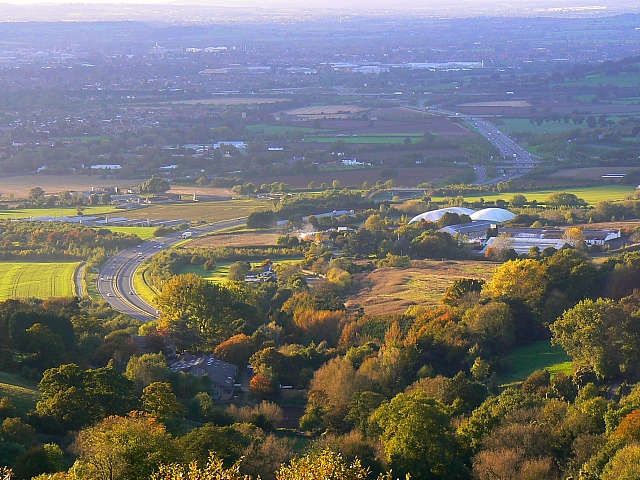
- The site in October 2007, seen from the east

- Location within Gloucestershire

General information
- Type: Aircraft factory
- Location: Gloucestershire, GL3 4UB
- Coordinates: 51.844°N 2.124°W
- Elevation: 90 m (295 ft)
- Completed: 1941
- Inaugurated: 1941
- Client: Gloster Aircraft Company
- Owner: Gloster Aircraft Company

Dimensions
- Other dimensions: 150,000 sq ft

The Bentham Works was a site of the Gloster Aircraft Company.

== History ==
It was built in 1941 at the bottom of Crickley Hill. It was assessed to be listed by Historic England in 2010, but was not listed.

=== Production ===
The Gloster Meteor, the first jet fighter, was built at the site. In 1942 there were 130 employees working at the site. Gloster aircraft were tested at RAF Moreton Valence.

The first Gloster Meteor DG202 was ground-run at the site on 29 June 1942.

Gloster's design and development was at Bentham.

The Meteor would first fly on 5 March 1943, piloted by Michael Daunt, from RAF Cranwell in Lincolnshire; the Meteor was originally to have been called Thunderbolt; the first aircraft had Halford H-1 engines (de Havilland Goblin) as the Power Jets W.2 was not ready in time. Gloster aircraft were also flown from RAF Edgehill in Oxfordshire on the north-east of Cotswolds south of the A422, as this was halfway between the Bentham site and Lutterworth (later at Whetstone) in Leicestershire, where the jet engines were being developed by Power Jets; Power Jets also had a site at Barnoldswick. The world's first turboprop aircraft was Meteor EE227 flown from RAF Church Broughton in Derbyshire on 20 September 1945, with a Rolls-Royce RB.50 Trent engine.

Squadron Leader Les Watts led 616 Squadron when it was the first to get the Meteor at RAF Culmhead.

=== German jet aircraft ===
The German Messerschmitt Me 262 had been developed at Augsburg, then Oberammergau, in Bavaria by Woldemar Voigt; the Me 262 first flew on 18 July 1942 at Leipheim in Bavaria, piloted by Fritz Wendel.

=== Present day ===
In 2018 the site was developed for housing, to be known as Bentham Green. The site was sold in October 2016 for £3.2m.

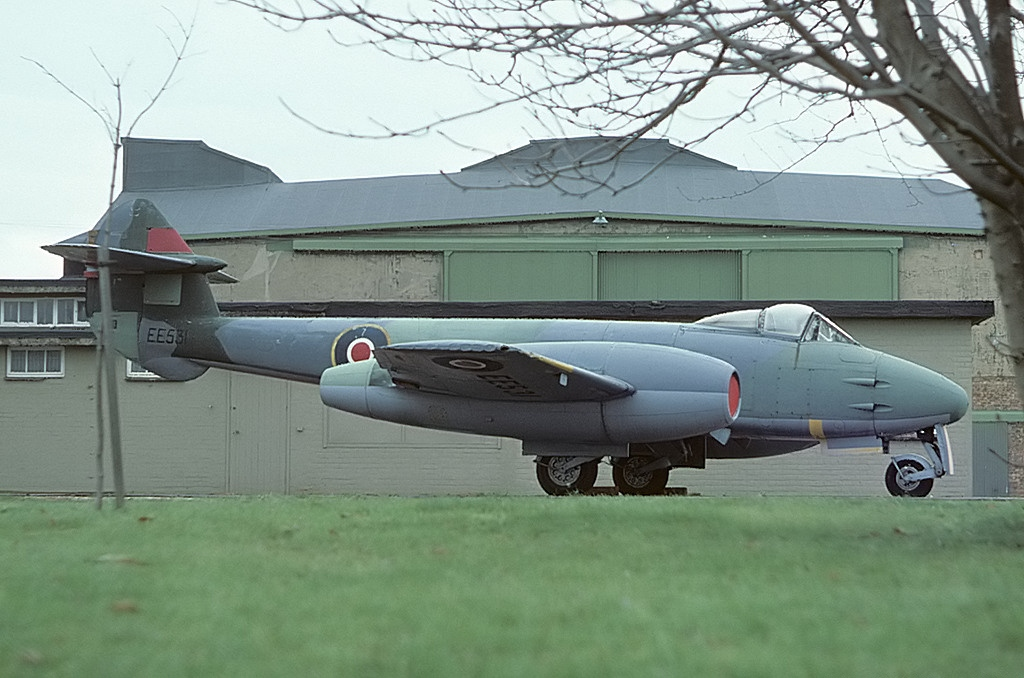
Gloster Meteor F4 EE531 at the site in December 1976

== Structure ==
The site is to the north of the dual-carriageway A417 road in Badgeworth. It was sited next to St Peter's Church.
