= Thrust1 =

Thrust1 was a British-designed and built jet-propelled car. The car was designed and built by its driver Richard Noble, who later achieved the land speed record with his car Thrust2.

Thrust1 itself was never intended to be a contender for the record. Noble's plan was for three cars: Thrust1 "to learn the ropes", a second demonstration car to raise interest and the essential large-scale sponsorship, then Thrust3 for an attempt on the record.

== Details ==
The car was powered by a military-surplus Rolls-Royce Derwent engine, as the simplest jet engine available. The particular engine used was a Mk 8 from a Gloster Meteor (Note: Sourced from well-known surplus dealers, Portsmouth Marine Salvage) of around 3,500 pounds thrust. The ladder chassis was also acquired as surplus, from Noble's employers GKN Sankey. The extremely tight project budget was initially funded by Noble selling his own car, a Triumph TR6. (Note: A chassis, incidentally, built in part of the same GKN Sankey plant) The direct costs of the project, estimated afterwards, were at around £1,500, including £1,100 for the TR6 Sponsorship was acquired from a variety of small agreements, including sponsorship-in-kind from the tool manufacturer Black & Decker. Construction began in the garage of Noble's flat in Thames Ditton. By 1975, the car was completed in a lock-up garage at Turnham Green.

The first test run was at RAF St Athan in South Wales. This was little more than a shakedown at low power, and no more than 80 mph. A demonstration run for filming was also made around the circuit at Brands Hatch. Runs were also conducted at RNAY Wroughton near Swindon. By 1977 the team were ready for a high-speed run, planned for the long 10,000 foot runway of RAF Fairford

The first high-speed run was planned for 7 March 1977, the day after Noble's thirty-first birthday. A successful first run was made from a standing start at idle thrust and gradual acceleration, reaching an estimated top speed of 180 mph. The second run was planned to be a drag start, with thrust built up against the brakes and then released. At around 140 mph though, a rear-wheel bearing seized (Note: The rear axle was from a normal production road car, including its differential casing and drum brakes.) and the car went sideways, then rolled. The triple roll was mostly airborne and the car landed on its side, with relatively little damage. Noble was unhurt. The Derwent engine, and its protruding combustion chambers, took much of the damage. The jetpipe broke loose and at least one combustion chamber was crumpled.

The car never ran again, and the wreckage was sold to a scrap dealer for £175, after parts had been removed to ensure that it could never be run again. Despite the crash, Noble was not disheartened and saw this as the conclusion of the first step of his original plan.

== Successor ==
By October of the same year, an engine had already been acquired for the next project, Thrust2 and this Rolls-Royce Avon was displayed at the London Motorfair to raise interest and sponsorship.
