= Rolls-Royce Derwent =

1940s British turbojet aircraft engine

Derwent
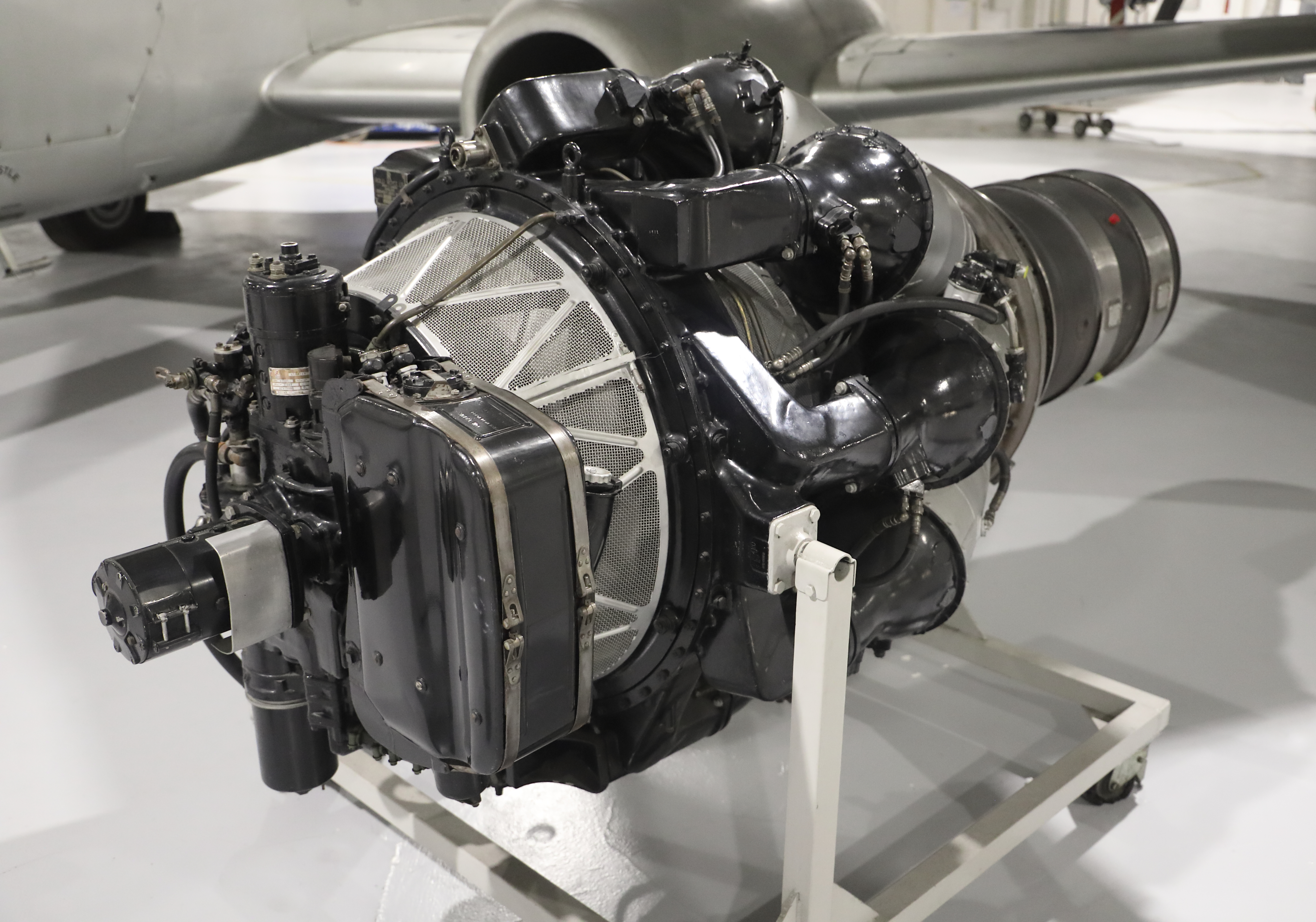
- Rolls-Royce Derwent on display at the Royal Air Force Museum London
- Type: Turbojet
- Manufacturer: Rolls-Royce
- First run: 1943
- Major applications: Gloster Meteor
- Developed from: Rover W.2B/23
- Developed into: Rolls-Royce RB.50 Trent; Klimov RD-500; Rolls-Royce Nene

The Rolls-Royce RB.37 Derwent is a 1940s British centrifugal compressor turbojet engine, the second Rolls-Royce jet engine to enter production. It was an improved version of the Rolls-Royce Welland, which itself was a renamed version of Frank Whittle's Power Jets W.2B. Rolls-Royce inherited the Derwent design from Rover when they took over their jet engine development in 1943.

== Design and development ==
=== Rover ===
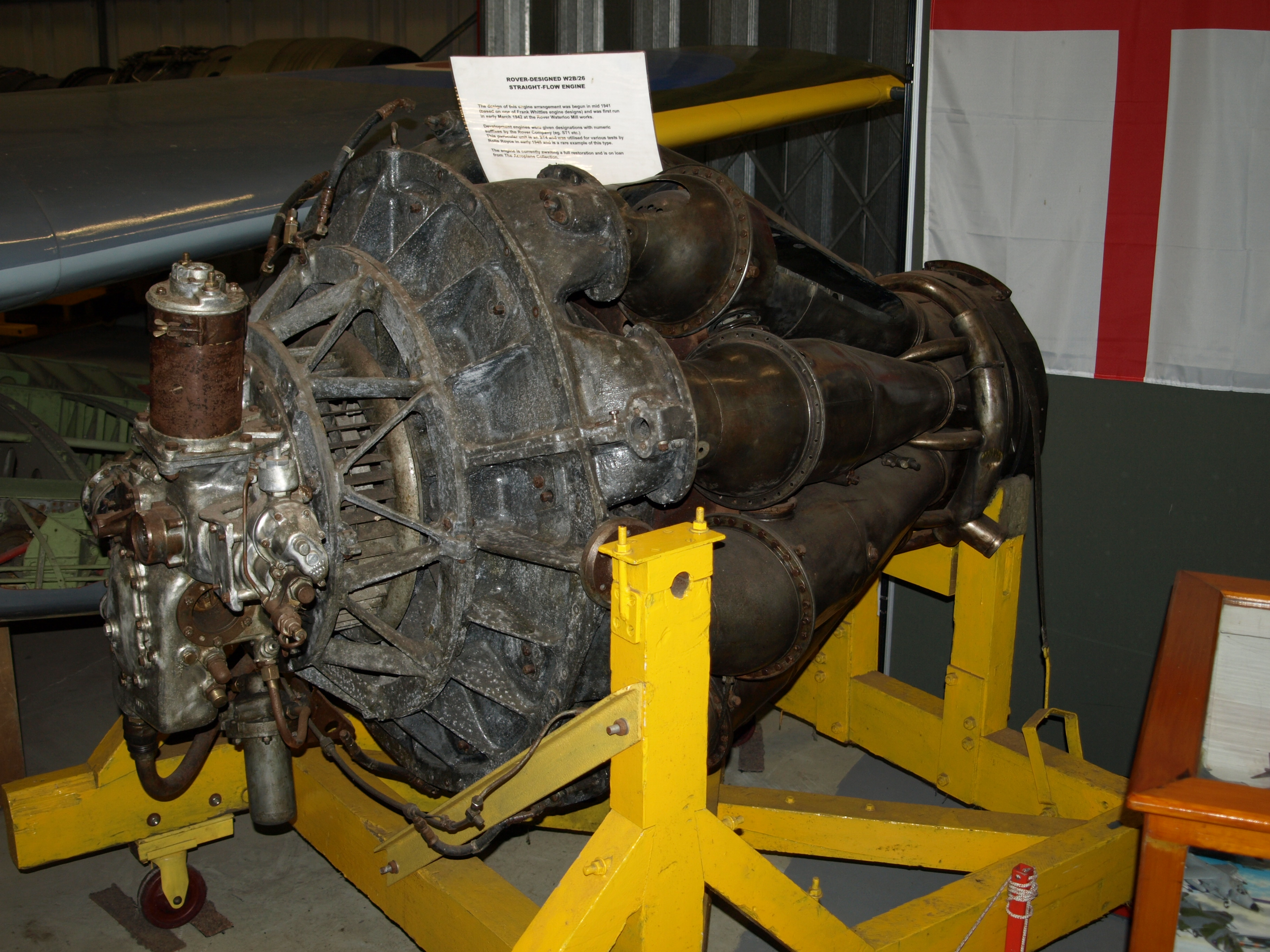
A Rover W.2B/26 on display at the Midland Air Museum This design was later to become the Derwent

When Rover was selected for production of Whittle's designs in 1941 they set up their main jet factory at Barnoldswick, staffed primarily by Power Jets personnel. Rover's Maurice Wilks was also aware of the potential of a more efficient design that removed the Power Jets' "folded" layout with a straight-through airflow. It would also simplify production. This layout had already been used by Whittle in his drawings of the W2Y and W3X and was also being pursued by the de Havilland Company with the Halford H.1. Wilks set up a design office at Waterloo Mill, Clitheroe with Adrian Lombard leading the design of an engine with this configuration. The design was done in secret and was sanctioned by the Ministry of Aircraft Production (MAP) but Whittle believed all effort should have been directed towards flight testing of the reverse-flow engine.

While work at Barnoldswick continued on what was now known as the W.2B/23, Lombard's new design became the W.2B/26. .

=== Rolls-Royce ===
By 1941 it was obvious to all that the arrangement was not working; Whittle was constantly frustrated by what he was seeing as Rover's inability to deliver production-quality parts for a test engine and became increasingly vocal about his complaints. Likewise, Rover was losing interest in the project after the delays and constant harassment from Power Jets in the critical testing process stage, where testing new designs and materials to breaking point is vital.

Earlier, in 1940, Stanley Hooker of Rolls-Royce had met with Whittle and later introduced him to Ernest Hives. Rolls-Royce had a fully developed supercharger division, directed by Hooker, which was naturally suited to jet engine work. Hives agreed to supply key parts to help the project along. Eventually, by mutual agreement between the Minister of Aircraft Production and the boards of Rover and Rolls-Royce, the Rover jet factory at Barnoldswick was exchanged for the Rolls-Royce Meteor tank engine factory in Nottingham. Lombard was retained as supervising engineer and went on to become the chief engineer of the Aero Engine Division of Rolls-Royce. Subsequent Rolls-Royce jet engines would be designated in an "RB" series, the /26 Derwent becoming the RB.26.

Problems were soon ironed out, and the original /23 design was ready for flight by late 1943. This gave the team some breathing room, so they redesigned the /26's inlets for increased airflow and thrust. Adding improved fuel and oil systems, the newly named Derwent Mk.I entered production with 2,000 lbf (8.9 kN) of thrust. Mk.II, III and IV's followed, peaking at 2,400 lbf (10.7 kN) of thrust. The Derwent was the primary engine of all the early Meteors except a small number of Welland-equipped models which were quickly removed from service. The Mk.II was also modified with a cropped impeller (turbine unchanged) and a reduction gearbox driving a five-bladed propeller. It was called the Rolls-Royce RB.50 Trent and was the first turboprop to fly. Two were installed in a Meteor I.

=== Mk.V ===
The basic Derwent concept was also used to produce a redesigned and larger 5,000 lbf (22.2 kN) thrust engine known as the Rolls-Royce Nene. The Nene was such an advance over the Derwent that Derwent development effectively ended. The Nene was, however, larger in diameter and so could not fit into the nacelles of the Meteor. The next Derwent version, the Derwent Mk.V, was instead produced by scaling down the new Nene to the diameter of the previous Derwent, specifically for use on the Meteor.

Several Derwents and Nenes were sold to the Soviet Union by the then Labour government, causing a major political row, as the Nene was the most powerful production turbojet in the world at the time. The Soviets promptly reverse engineered the Derwent V and produced their own unlicensed version, the Klimov RD-500. The Nene was reverse-engineered to form the propulsion unit for the famous MiG-15 jet fighter. The Derwent Mk.V was also used on the Canadian Avro Jetliner, but this was not put into production.

On 7 November 1945, a Meteor powered by the Derwent V set a world air speed record of 606 mph (975 km/h) true airspeed.

== Applications ==
=== Aircraft ===
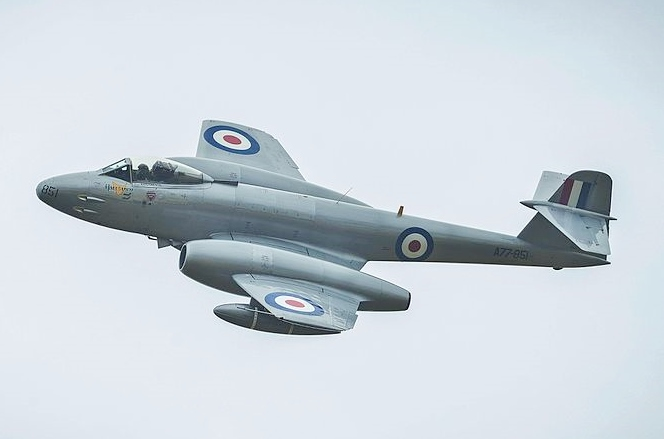
Gloster Meteor

- Avro 707
- Avro Canada C102 Jetliner
- Fairey Delta 1
- FMA I.Ae. 27 Pulqui I Argentine design flown in 1947 and preserved at the National Air Museum
- FMA I.Ae 38 proposed jet powered variant
- Fokker S.14 Machtrainer
- Gloster Meteor
- Nord 1601
- Tupolev '73'
- Tupolev '78'

=== Other applications ===
An unusual application of the Derwent V was to propel the former paddle steamer PS Lucy Ashton. The 1888 ship had her steam machinery removed and replaced by four Derwents in 1950–1951. The purpose of this was to conduct research on the friction and drag produced by a ship hull in real-life conditions. Jets were preferable to marine propellers or paddles as these would have created a disturbance in the water, and the force exerted by them was harder to measure. The four engines could propel the Lucy Ashton at a speed in excess of 15 knots (28 km/h; 17 mph).

A Derwent Mk.8 from a Gloster Meteor was used in the jet propelled car Thrust1, which was built by Richard Noble in 1977. This was an initial development car that paved the way for Thrust2, which Noble drove to set a new land speed record in 1982.

== Variants ==
- Derwent I – first production version, 2,000 lbf (8.9 kN) of thrust
- Derwent II – thrust increased to 2,200 lbf (9.8 kN)
- Derwent III – experimental variant providing vacuum for wing boundary layer control
- Derwent IV – thrust increased to 2,400 lbf (10.7 kN)
- Derwent 5 – scaled-down version of the Rolls-Royce Nene developing 3,500 lbf (15.6 kN) of thrust
- Derwent 8 – developed version giving 3,600 lbf (16.0 kN) of thrust
- Derwent 9

== Engines on display ==
- A Derwent RB.37 Mk.8 is on public display at the City of Norwich Aviation Museum in Horsham St Faith, Norfolk.
- A Derwent RB.37 Mk 5 cutaway is on public display at the Trenchard Museum RAF Halton, Halton, Buckinghamshire

== Specifications (Derwent I) ==
Data from Aircraft Engines of the world 1946

==== General characteristics ====
- Type: Centrifugal compressor turbojet
- Length: 84 in (2,134 mm)
- Diameter: 43 in (1,092 mm)
- Dry weight: 975 lb (442 kg)

==== Components ====
- Compressor: Single-stage double-sided centrifugal compressor
- Combustors: 10 × can combustion chambers
- Turbine: Single-stage axial
- Fuel type: Kerosene
- Oil system: Pressure feed, dry sump with scavenge, cooling and filtration

==== Performance ====
- Maximum thrust: 2,000 lbf (9 kN) at 16,000 rpm at sea level
  - Military, static: 2,000 lbf (8.90 kN) at 16,600 rpm at sea level,
  - Cruising, static: 1,550 lbf (6.89 kN) at 15,400 rpm at sea level,
  - Idling, static: 120 lbf (0.53 kN) at 5,500 rpm at sea level,
- Overall pressure ratio: 3.9:1
- Turbine inlet temperature: 1,560 °F (849 °C)
- Specific fuel consumption: 1.17 lb/lbf·h (119.25 kg/kN·h),
- Thrust-to-weight ratio: 2.04

== See also ==
Related development

- Klimov RD-500
- Rolls-Royce Nene
- Rolls-Royce RB.50 Trent
- Rolls-Royce Welland

Related lists

- List of aircraft engines

== Citations ==
=== Bibliography ===
- Bridgman, L, (ed.) Jane's fighting aircraft of World War II. London: Crescent, 1998. ISBN 0-517-67964-7
- Buttler, Tony (July–August 2001). "Turbojets for Stalin: Some Facts Behind the Sale of British Jet Engines to Russia". Air Enthusiast. No. 94. pp. 73–77. ISSN 0143-5450.
- Brooks, David S. (1997). Vikings at Waterloo. Derby: Rolls-Royce Heritage Trust. ISBN 1-872922-08-2.
- Gunston, Bill (1989). Rolls-Royce Aero Engines. Patrick Stephens Limited. p. 119. ISBN 1-85260-037-3.
- Kay, Anthony L. (2007). Turbojet History and Development 1930-1960. Ramsbury: The Crowood Press. ISBN 978-1-86126-912-6.
- "Rolls-Royce Derwent". Flight. 25 October 1945. pp. 447–450.
- Wilkinson, Paul H. (1946). Aircraft Engines of the world 1946. London: Sir Isaac Pitman & Sons. pp. 294–297.
