= Badgeworth =

Village in Gloucestershire, England

Coordinates: 51.873204°N 2.140201°W

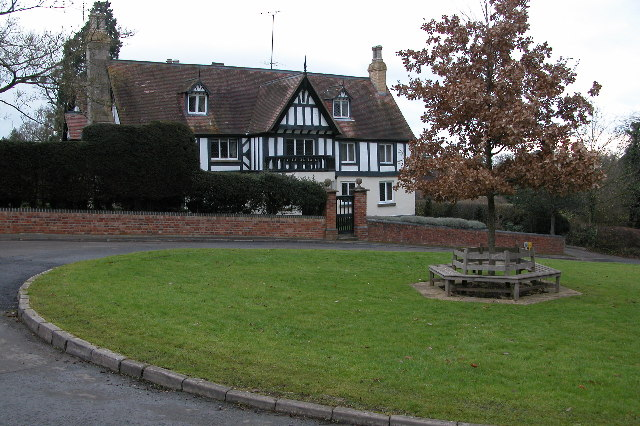
- The area by the church

- Location within Gloucestershire
- Population: 1,286
- District: Tewkesbury
- Shire county: Gloucestershire
- Region: South West
- Country: England
- Sovereign state: United Kingdom
- Post town: Gloucester
- Postcode district: GL3
- Post town: Cheltenham
- Postcode district: GL51
- Dialling code: 01452
- Police: Gloucestershire
- Fire: Gloucestershire
- Ambulance: South Western
- UK Parliament: Tewkesbury; North Cotswolds

Badgeworth is a village and civil parish in the Tewkesbury district of Gloucestershire, England, between Gloucester and Cheltenham. According to the 2001 census, the parish had a population of 1,206, increasing to 1,286 at the 2011 census. Apart from the village of Badgeworth the parish also includes Bentham and Little Witcombe.

Despite its small size and being situated nearly a mile south of the line, in 1843 Badgeworth was provided with a station on the newly opened Birmingham and Gloucester Railway (later part of the Midland Railway and subsequently the LMS), but this was a very early casualty, closing as early as 1846.

== History ==
The Bentham Works site of Gloster Aircraft Company was built north of the A417 in 1941.

== Governance ==
An electoral ward in the same name exists. This ward stretches from Boddington in the north to Badgeworth in the south. The total ward population at the 2011 census was 2,124.

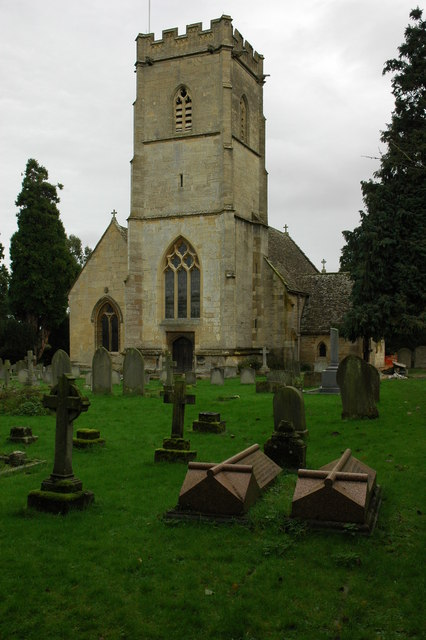
Holy Trinity Church

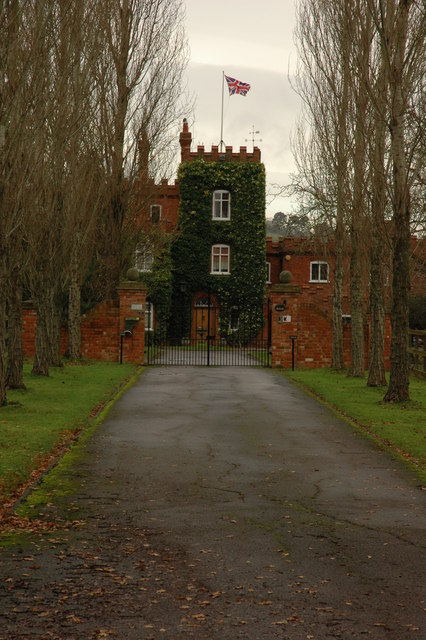
House viewed from the Gloucestershire Way which crosses its driveway

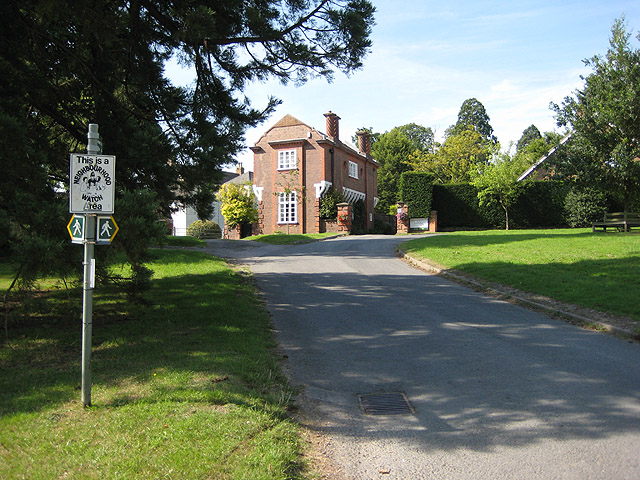
Badgeworth Court, in the Dutch Colonial style (1829), former home of Colonel Selwyn Payne
