= George Carter (engineer) =

British engineer

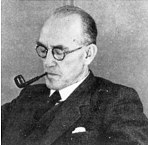
- Born: 9 March 1889; Bedford
- Died: 27 February 1969 (aged 79); Gloucestershire
- Spouse: Hilda Back
- Children: Wilfred Maxwell (Peter)
- Parent(s): George Alfred Carter, Bertha Ellen Odell
- Engineering career
- Discipline: Aeronautics
- Institutions: RAeS
- Employer: Gloster Aircraft Company
- Significant design: Gloster Meteor, Gloster E.1/44
- Significant advance: Gloster E.28/39
- Awards: RAeS Silver Medal (1947)

Wilfred George Carter CBE FRAeS (9 March 1889 – 27 February 1969) was a British engineer, who was the chief designer at Glosters from 1937. He was awarded the C.B.E. in 1947 and was appointed Technical Director of Gloster Aircraft in 1948 remaining on the board of directors until 1954. He continued to serve Glosters for a number of years after his retirement in a consultancy role until 1958. He designed the first British jet aircraft.

== Career ==
Carter had his apprenticeship with W. H. Allen Sons and Co. Ltd of Bedford from 1906 to 1912. From 1916 to 1920 he was Chief Draughtsman of Sopwith Aviation Company, then Chief Designer from 1920 to 1924 of Hawker Engineering Co. Ltd, working on the Heron and Hornbill fighter aircraft, and the Horsley bomber. From 1924 to 1928 he worked with Short Bros of Rochester, designing a seaplane for the 1927 Schneider Trophy. From 1928 to 1931, Carter worked for de Havilland. From 1935 to 1936, he also worked for Avro.

=== Gloster ===
Carter joined the Gloucestershire (later Gloster) Aircraft Company, at Brockworth, Gloucestershire, in 1931. He initially worked on the De Havilland DH.72 bomber (only one was ever built), which was given to Gloster from de Havilland.

At Gloster Aircraft, Carter was instrumental in the design of two of the most significant biplane fighters for the RAF, the Gauntlet and Gladiator. Carter also designed the Gloster F.9/37 a promising twin-engine (Bristol Taurus) fighter design that never entered production, before he turned to work on jet aircraft. He was Chief Designer from 1936 to 1948. In 1934 Gloster had been taken over by Hawker, causing the chief designer, Henry Folland, to leave, making way for his successor.

== Jet aircraft ==
It was during a visit by Frank Whittle to Gloster that Carter became involved in the development of jet aircraft. At the time Gloster were working on a twin-boom fighter, for specification F.18/37 - also used for the Hawker Typhoon, to be powered by a Napier Sabre piston engine which attracted the attention of Whittle who thought that the layout would be suitable for his new engine. Although the design Whittle saw would not progress beyond the project stage, within a few weeks, Carter was asked by the Air Ministry to submit plans for a brand new aircraft to use Whittle's engine. He agreed to the project before seeing the engine for himself. While not impressed with the engine itself, when he saw it running he was convinced that it could develop into a suitable powerplant given what they had managed to achieve in the somewhat primitive conditions at Lutterworth.

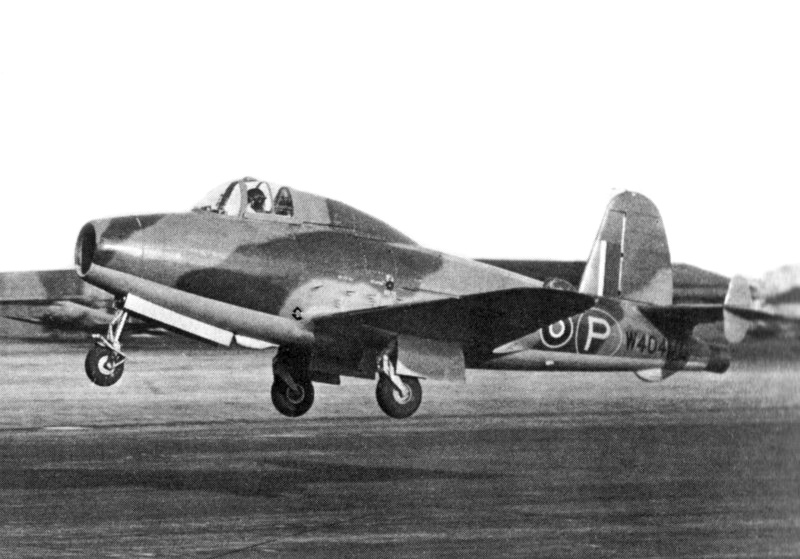
Gloster E.28/39

The Gloster E.28/39 was designed primarily to prove the concept of turbojet powered flight, the Air Ministry however insisted that the design include provision for four guns and 2,000 rounds of ammunition even if these were not fitted in the prototype. The contract to build the E.28/39 also known as the Pioneer was placed with Gloster on 3 February 1940. The aircraft was built in secret at the Regents garage, Cheltenham and first flew on 15 April 1941 at RAF Cranwell, becoming the first British and Allied jet aircraft.

Even before the Pioneer flew, the Air Ministry encouraged Carter to design a practical jet fighter since the Pioneer was not suitable because it was unlikely that an engine of at least 2,000 lbf (8.9 kN) thrust would be available in the near future. Carter therefore decided that the design would require two engines. The result was designated the F.9/40 which first flew on 5 March 1943 and would find worldwide fame as the Gloster Meteor. His later designs included the E.1/44. He supervised the design of the Gloster GA-5 delta-wing fighter (later the Gloster Javelin which first flew in 1951 from RAF Moreton Valence south of Gloucester), which was designed by Richard Walker (Gloster's chief designer) and powered by Armstrong Siddeley Sapphire engines.

== Honours ==
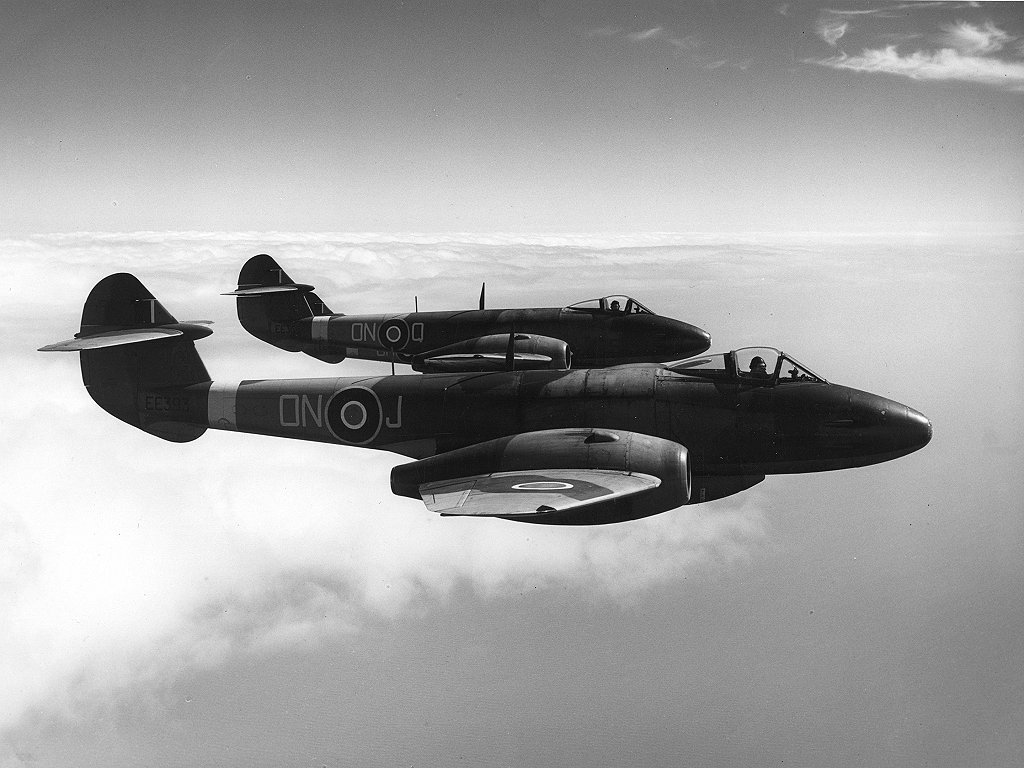
Gloster Meteor

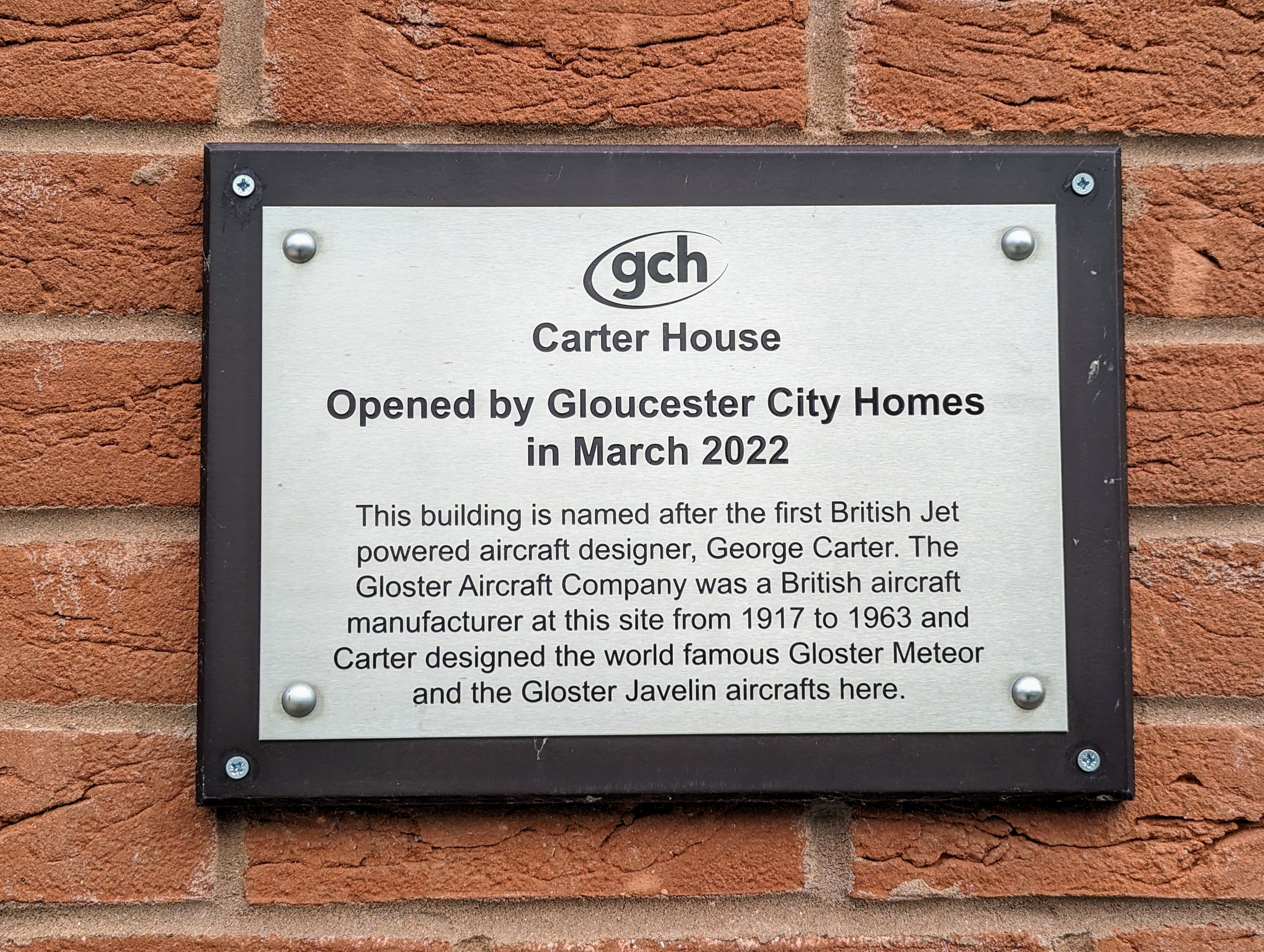
Carter House

Along with other pioneering aircraft designers, Carter was honoured in 1997 with the issuance of a special postage stamp in a series called "The Architects of the Air." Other partnerships featured on the stamps were R. J. Mitchell and Supermarine's celebrated Spitfire on the 20p stamp, R.E. Bishop and the de Havilland company's Mosquito on a 37p stamp and Sydney Camm, designer of the Hawker Hunter fighter, featured on the 63p value.

Chairman of Royal Mail's Stamp Advisory Committee, Adam Novak said: "Each one of the aircraft featured on the stamps was unique and revolutionary in its own way. The Architects of the Air were the trail blazers for today's modern aircraft designs." George Carter's face dramatically forms the clouds overlooking a flight of a Meteor Mk T7 on the 1997 43p stamp.

In March 2022, Gloucester City Homes dedicated to Carter a newly built residential building near the old Gloster aircraft factory.

=== Personal life ===
(Wilfred) George Carter was born in Bedford. His father George Alfred Carter was a journeyman carpenter and later became a builder. Carter married Hilda Back at St Martin's, Bedford on 20 April 1916. They had a son, Wilfred Maxwell (Peter), born in 1917. Carter became CBE in 1947, and lived in Haroldstone House, Cold Slad Lane on Crickley Hill, Gloucester. He was awarded the RAeS Silver Medal in 1947.
