= Gerry Sayer =

English test pilot

Phillip Edward Gerald Sayer OBE
- Born: 5 February 1905; Colchester, Essex, England
- Disappeared: 21 October 1942 (aged 37); North Sea
- Occupation: Test pilot
- Employer: Gloster Aircraft Company
- Known for: Piloting the first flight of the first British jet aircraft
- Spouse: May Violet Ellen Wallace-Smyth (m. 1929–1942)
- Parent: Wing Commander E. J. Sayer MC (father)
- Military career
- Allegiance: United Kingdom
- Branch: Royal Air Force
- Service years: 1924–1929
- Rank: Flying Officer

Flying Officer Phillip Edward Gerald Sayer OBE (5 February 1905 – 21 October 1942), was the chief test pilot for Gloster Aircraft as well as a serving RAF officer. "Gerry" Sayer flew Britain's maiden jet flight in Sir Frank Whittle's Gloster E.28/39 (Pioneer), an aircraft designed by George Carter, on 15 May 1941.

== Early life ==
He was born in Colchester, the only son of Wing Commander E. J. Sayer MC. He attended St Joseph's College, Nainital in India and Colchester Royal Grammar School in England.

== Career ==
=== Royal Air Force ===
Sayer joined the Royal Air Force on 30 June 1924, being granted a short service commission with the rank of probationary pilot officer, and was posted to No. 29 Squadron RAF, based at RAF Duxford. He was confirmed in his rank on 23 May 1925, and was promoted to flying officer on 30 March 1926. He learnt to fly in an Avro 504K, and later flew Sopwith Snipes, before becoming a test pilot at RAF Martlesham Heath, the home of the Aeroplane and Armament Experimental Establishment.

=== Test pilot ===
Sayer was transferred to the Reserve of Air Force Officers (Class A) on 2 March 1929, to become second test pilot with Hawker Aircraft, assistant to Group Captain P. W. S. (George) Bulman (who first flew the Hurricane on 6 November 1935). He also competed in the 1930 King's Cup Air Race, flying the Cirrus Hermes-powered Desoutter Mk.I (G-AAPY) entered by Charles Bernard Wilson. He averaged 108.4 miles per hour (174.5 km/h) over the course and came in 23rd place.

In 1934 Hawker took over the Gloster Aircraft Company and Sayer was appointed chief test pilot in November 1934. On 2 March 1937 Sayer relinquished his reserve commission on completion of service, and was permitted to retain his rank.

On 15 May 1941 at 7.45pm, he took off from RAF Cranwell, near Sleaford in Lincolnshire in the Gloster E.28/39 (W4041/G) powered by the W.1 engine and flew for 17 minutes, flying at over 500 miles per hour (800 km/h), impossible for other aircraft at the time in level flight. That Gloster aircraft has been in the Science Museum since 1946. A second aircraft of the same type (W4046/G) would be later demonstrated to Winston Churchill on 17 April 1943, having first flown on 1 March 1943 and later crashed in June 1943.

On 21 October 1942 Sayer departed from RAF Acklington in a Hawker Typhoon to carry out tests of a gunsight involving gun firing into Druridge Bay Ranges, accompanied by another Typhoon. Neither aircraft returned, and it was assumed that they collided over the bay. He was replaced as Gloster's test pilot by Michael Daunt, who would be the first to fly the Gloster Meteor (powered by two de Havilland Goblin engines designed by Frank Halford) on 5 March 1943 at RAF Cranwell.

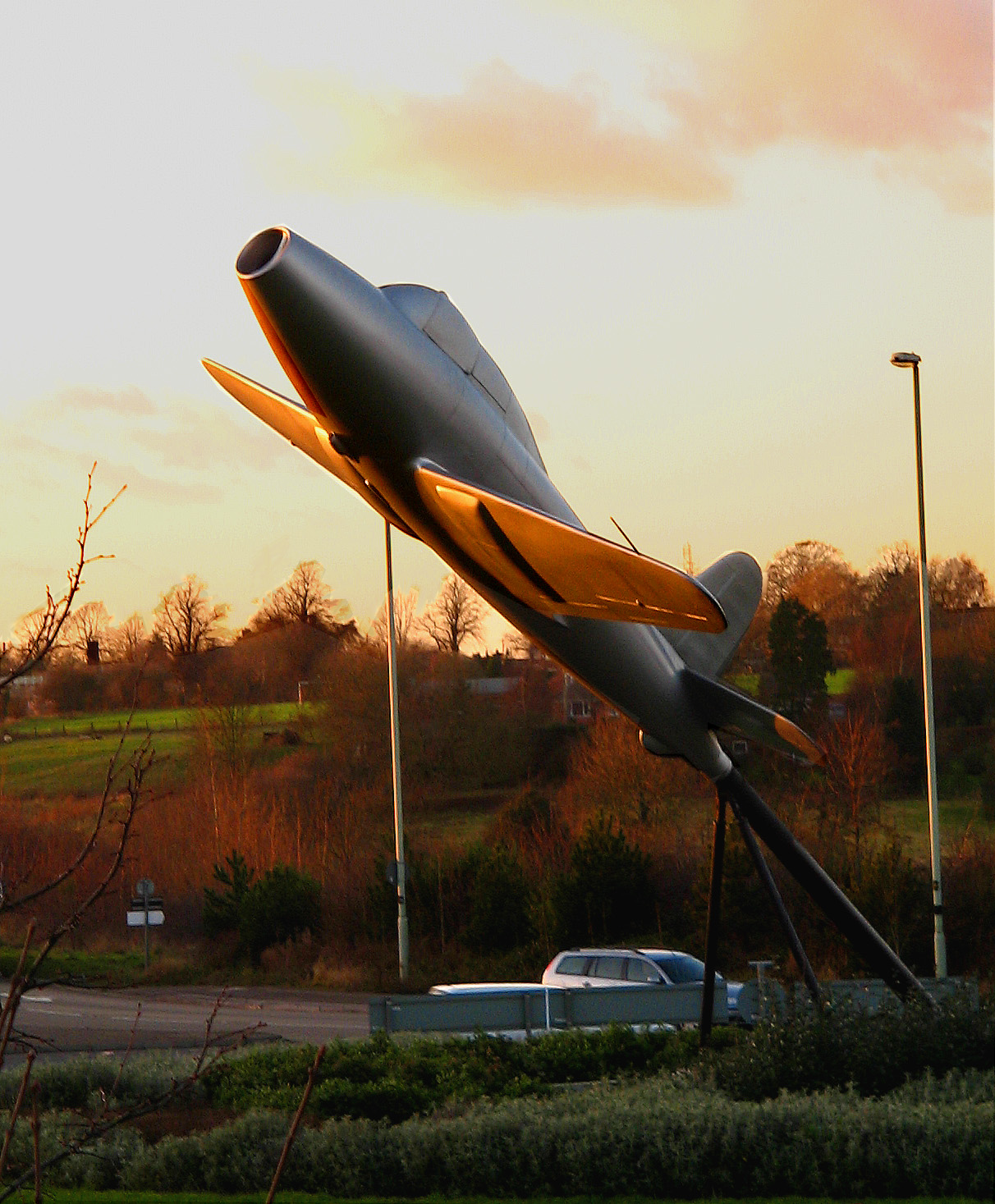
Gloster E.28/39 memorial at Lutterworth.

== Personal life ==
Sayer was made an officer of the Order of the British Empire in the 1942 New Years Honours List.

In January 1929, he became engaged to May Violet Ellen Wallace-Smyth daughter of the vicar of Bures, north Essex. They were married on 7 June 1930 at Holy Innocents Church, Lamarsh in north Essex.
