= John Grierson (pilot) =

- Born: 2 January 1909; Liverpool, Lancashire, England
- Died: 21 May 1977 (aged 68); Washington, United States
- Military career
- Allegiance: United Kingdom
- Branch: Royal Air Force
- Rank: Wing Commander
- Other work: Test Pilot, Author

John Grierson (2 January 1909 – 21 May 1977) was an English long-distance flier, test pilot, author, and aviation administrator.

Grierson started his flying lessons at Brooklands while still a schoolboy, graduated from RAF Cranwell in 1929, and flew out to India in 1930 in his own Gypsy Moth, named Rouge et Noir, to join his RAF Squadron. In the same aircraft he established a record in 1931 with a 41½-day flight from Karachi, India to Lympne, England, and in 1932 flew 8,800 miles across the USSR to Samarkand. He had asked his friend Bernard Shaw to lobby the Soviet authorities to grant him passage.

He met the Lindberghs in Reykjavík, Iceland in 1933. He was at that time attempting to fly solo to America in Rouge et Noir, now fitted with floats, but overturned on take-off. His next effort was in a Fox Moth named Robert Bruce. On his third try, Grierson successfully made the first London - Ottawa flight, at the same time making the first solo flight across the Greenland ice cap.

Grierson served as an Operations Officer in the Air Ministry, and was a test pilot for Britain's first jet aircraft, the Gloster E.28/39, making the first flight of the second E.28/39, W4046/G, fitted with a Rover W2B/#110 turbo-jet, from Edgehill airfield on 1 March 1943, and of the Gloster Meteor F.9/40, making the latter's first U.S. flight on 15 April 1944. As a Wing Commander after World War II he was Deputy Director of Civil Aviation in the British Zone of Occupied Germany. He also worked as flight commodore for a whaling factory ship, Balaena, utilising two Walrus aircraft, and as an executive for a leading aircraft corporation in England.

He later lived in Guernsey where he kept touch with aviation by flying his own aeroplane and with polar flying, undertaking a flight to the South Pole in November 1966. He was a member of the Council of the Royal Geographical Society and Britain's representative on Operation Deep Freeze in Antarctica in 1966. He wrote and lectured widely on early aviation, and on Charles Lindbergh. He died just after speaking at the Smithsonian's Air and Space Museum's symposium on the fiftieth anniversary of Lindbergh's solo New York to Paris flight.

He is buried in the Churchyard of St Michael & All Angels church, in Offham, Kent.

== Published works ==
- Grierson, John (1934). Through Russia by air. G. T. Foulis & co., ltd.
- Grierson, John (1936). High failure: solo along the Arctic air route. W. Hodge & company, limited.
- Grierson, John (1946). Jet Flight. S. Low, Marston & co., ltd.
- Grierson, John (1949). Air Whaler. S. Low, Marston & co., ltd.
- Grierson, John (1960). Sir Hubert Wilkins, enigma of exploration. R. Hale.
- Grierson, John (1964). Challenge to the poles: Highlights of Arctic and Antarctic aviation. Archon Books.
- Grierson, John (1968). Heroes of the Polar Skies. Meredith Press.
- Grierson, John (1977). I remember Lindbergh. Harcourt Brace Jovanovich. ISBN 0-15-238895-8. "John Grierson."
