= Rolls-Royce RB.50 Trent =

1940s British turboprop aircraft engine

RB.50 Trent
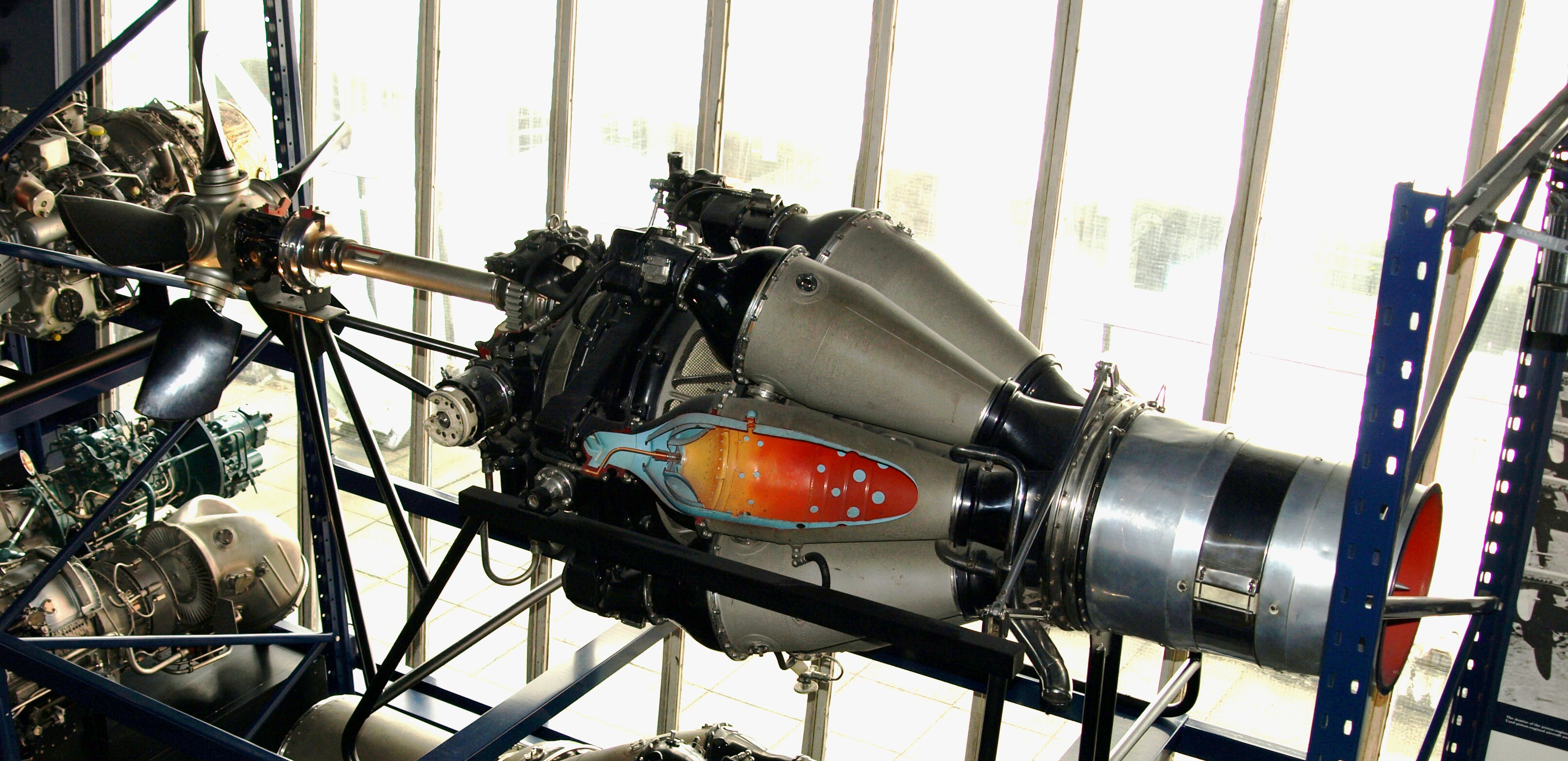
- A Rolls-Royce Trent turboprop on display at the Science Museum (London)
- Type: Turboprop
- Manufacturer: Rolls-Royce Limited
- First run: June 1944
- Major applications: Gloster Meteor F.1 (Trent variant)
- Developed from: Rolls-Royce Derwent
- Developed into: Rolls-Royce Clyde

The Rolls-Royce RB.50 Trent was the first Rolls-Royce turboprop engine.

== Design and development ==
The Trent was based on an invention by Sir Frank Whittle. It was a Derwent Mark II turbojet engine with a cropped impeller (turbine unchanged) and a reduction gearbox (designed by A A Rubbra) connected to a five-bladed Rotol propeller. The Trent ran for 633 hours on test before being installed in a Gloster Meteor jet fighter which flew for the first time on 20 September 1945 at the start of a 298-hour flight test programme.

== Applications ==
- Gloster Meteor

== Engines on display ==
A preserved Rolls-Royce Trent turboprop engine is on display at the London Science Museum.

A preserved RB50 Trent is displayed at the Rolls-Royce Heritage Trust in Derby.

== Specifications ==
The sole Trent Meteor EE227

==== General characteristics ====
- Type: Turboprop
- Length:
- Diameter:
- Dry weight: 1,000 lb turbine unit, reduction gear 250lb, propeller 250 lb, total engine/propeller weight 1,500 lb

==== Components ====
- Compressor: 1-stage double-sided centrifugal compressor
- Combustors: 10 x can combustion chambers
- Turbine: Single-stage axial
- Fuel type: Kerosene
- Oil system: pressure feed, dry sump with scavenge, cooling and filtration

==== Performance ====
- Maximum power output: 750 shp, with 1,250 lb (570 kg) residual thrust

== See also ==
- Jendrassik Cs-1, first turboprop engine

Related development

- Rolls-Royce Derwent
- Rolls-Royce Clyde

Comparable engines

- General Electric T31

Related lists

- List of aircraft engines
