= De Havilland Goblin =

1940s British turbojet aircraft engine

Goblin
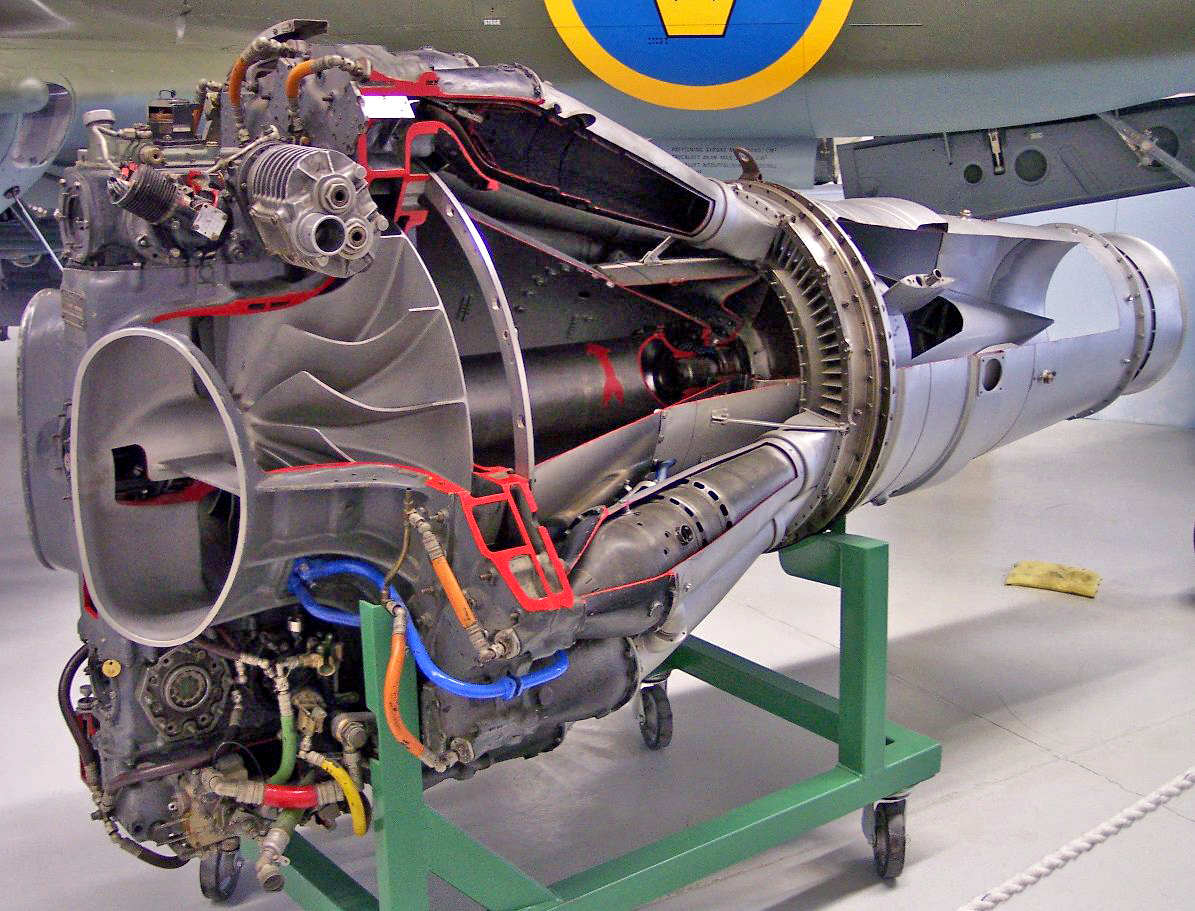
- Cutaway Goblin II
- Type: Turbojet
- Manufacturer: de Havilland Engine Company
- First run: 13 April 1942
- Major applications: de Havilland Vampire
- Developed into: de Havilland Ghost

The de Havilland Goblin, originally designated as the Halford H-1, is an early turbojet engine designed by Frank Halford and built by de Havilland. The Goblin was the second British jet engine to fly, after Whittle's Power Jets W.1, and the first to pass a type test and receive a type certificate issued for an aircraft propulsion jet engine.

Although it was conceived in 1941 it remained unchanged in basic form for 13 years by which time it had evolved to the Mk. 35 export version.

The Goblin was the primary engine of the de Havilland Vampire, and was to have been the engine for the F-80 Shooting Star (as the Allis-Chalmers J36) before that design switched engines due to production delays at Allis-Chalmers. The Goblin also powered the Saab 21R fighter, Fiat G.80 trainer and the de Havilland DH 108 "Swallow" experimental aircraft. The Goblin was later scaled up as the larger de Havilland Ghost, with the model numbers continuing from the last marks of the Goblin.

== Design and development ==
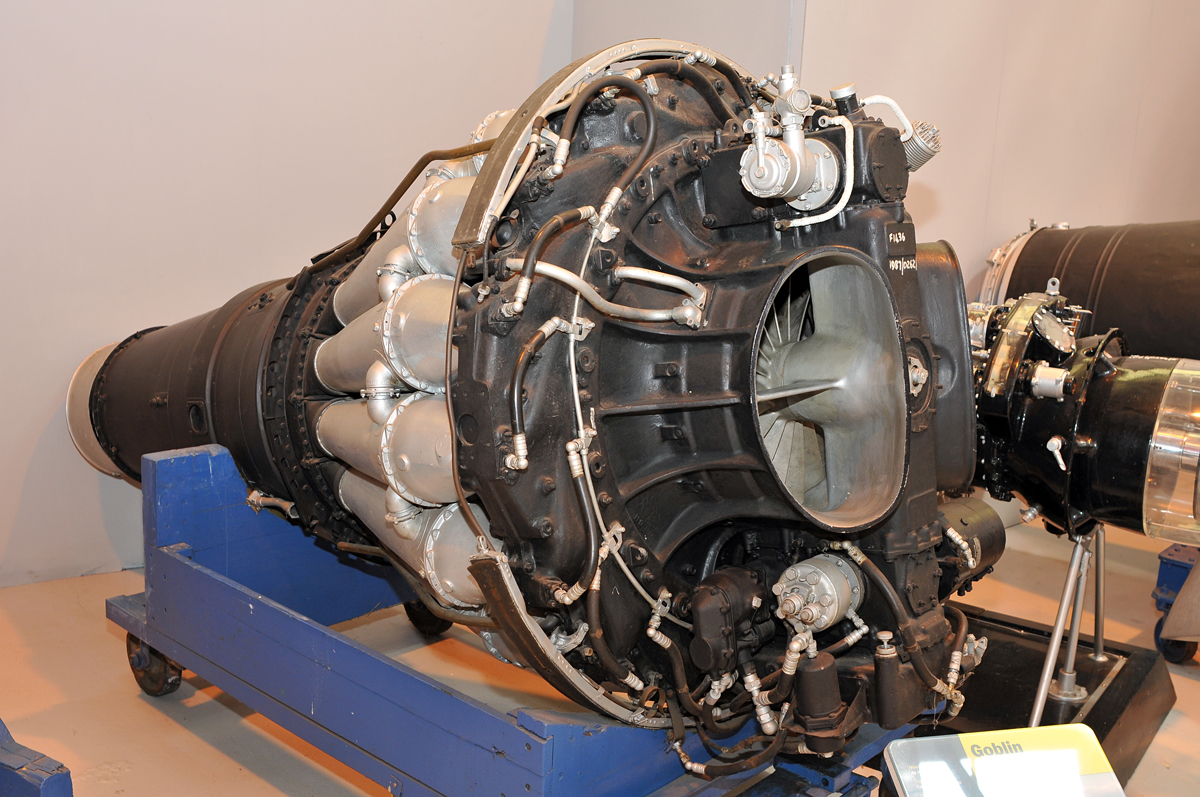
de Havilland Goblin at RAF Museum Cosford

Design of the engine was carried out by Frank Halford at his London consulting firm starting in April 1941. It was based on the overall design pattern pioneered by Frank Whittle, using a centrifugal compressor providing compressed air to sixteen individual combustion chambers, from which the exhaust powered a single-stage axial turbine.

Compared to Whittle designs, the H-1 was cleaned up in that it used a single-sided compressor with the inlet at the front, and a straight-through layout with the combustion chambers exhausting straight onto the turbine. Whittle's designs such as the Power Jets W.2 used a reverse-flow layout that piped the hot air back to the middle of the engine, in order to "fold" it and reduce its length. The straight-through design simplified the engine, at the expense of being slightly longer and requiring a longer power shaft between the turbine and compressor. Although it eliminated the Whittle-style "folding", the Goblin was still a compact design.

The H-1 first ran on 13 April 1942 and quickly matured to produce its full design thrust within two months. It first flew on 5 March 1943 in the Gloster Meteor, and on 26 September in the de Havilland Vampire. It was around this time that de Havilland purchased Halford's company and set him up as the chairman of the de Havilland Engine Company, with the engine name changing from H-1 to "Goblin", while the new H-2 design became the "Ghost" – de Havilland jet and rocket engines were largely named after spectral apparitions.

In July 1943, one of the two H-1s then available (actually the spare engine intended as a backup for the one installed in the Vampire prototype) was sent to the United States, where it was selected to become the primary engine of the Lockheed P-80 Shooting Star. This engine was fitted to the prototype P-80, which first flew on 9 January 1944. The engine was later accidentally destroyed in ground testing, and was replaced by the only remaining H-1 from the prototype Vampire. Allis-Chalmers was selected to produce the engine in the US as the J36, but ran into lengthy delays. Instead, the Allison J33, developed by General Electric as the I-40 (their greatly improved 4,000 lbf (18 kN) version of the J31, itself based on Whittle's W.1), was selected for the production P-80A.

== Variants ==
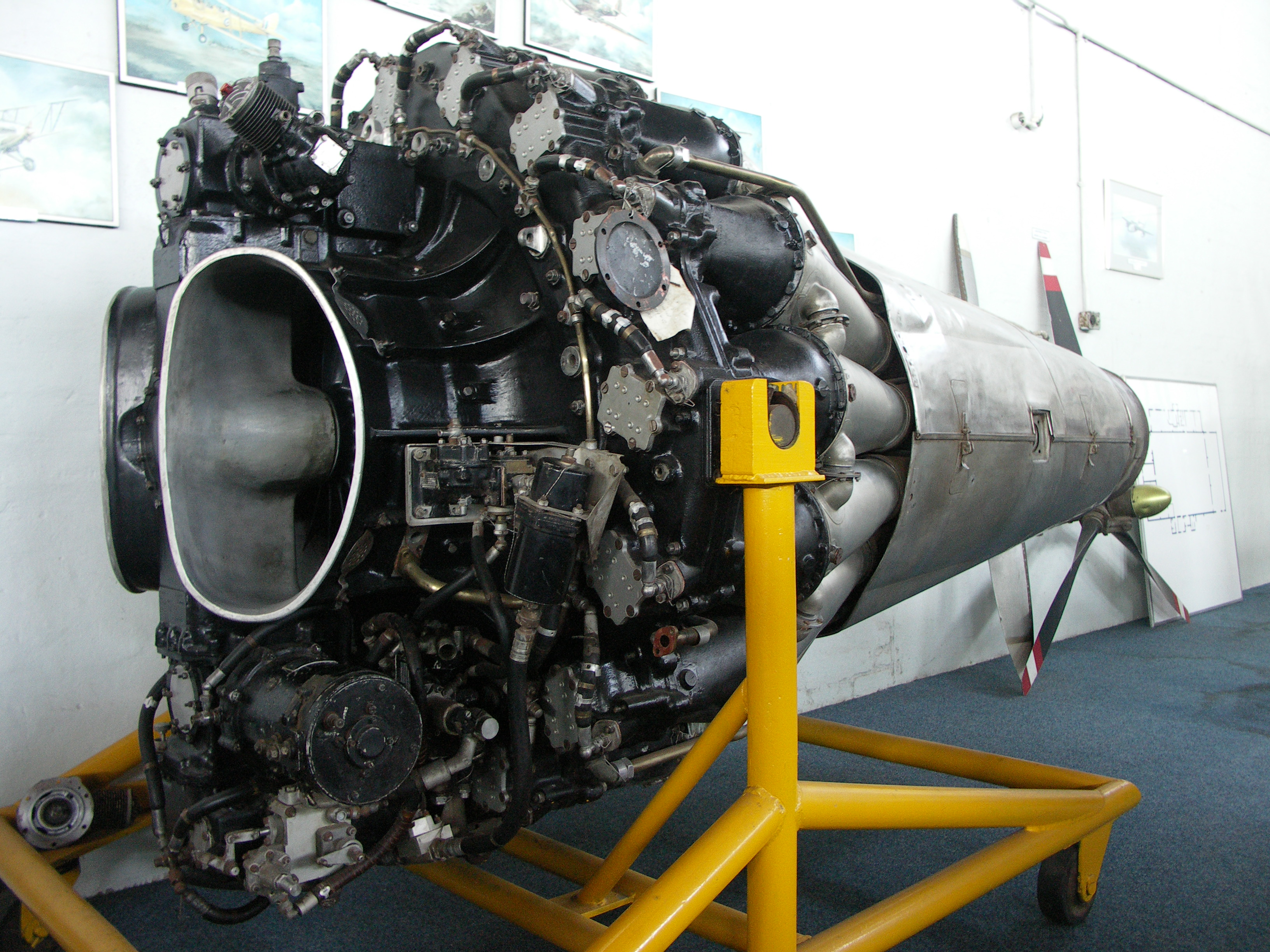
A complete Goblin engine

Thrust given in pound of force (lbf) and kilonewtons (kN).

H.1/Goblin I
Developed about 2,300 lbf (10.2 kN) thrust (nominal thrust for prototype) and 2,700 lbf (12.0 kN) for production models.
Goblin II (DGn.2)
3,100 lbf (13.8 kN)
Goblin 3 (DGn.3)
3,350 lbf (14.9 kN)
Goblin 35
3,500 lbf (15.6 kN)
Goblin 4 (DGn.4)
3,750 lbf (16.7 kN)
Allis-Chalmers J36
Licence production in the United States by Allis-Chalmers.
Svenska Flygmotor RM1
Goblin II production in Sweden
Svenska Flygmotor RM1A
Goblin III production in Sweden

== Applications ==
=== Aircraft applications ===
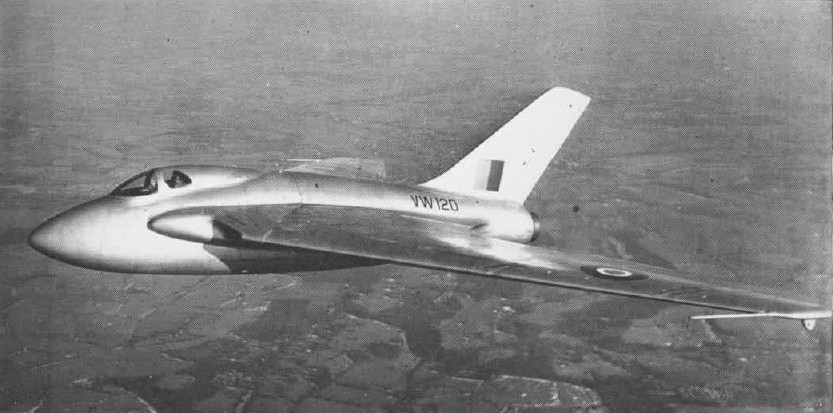
The Goblin powered DH.108 Swallow

- Curtiss XF15C-1
- de Havilland DH 108 Swallow
- de Havilland Vampire
- Fiat G.80
- Gloster Meteor
- Lockheed XP-80 Shooting Star
- Saab 21R

=== Alternative applications ===
- Bluebird K4

== Engines on display ==
Goblin engines are preserved and on display at several museums including:

- Brooklands Museum
- South Yorkshire Aircraft Museum
- Canadian Warplane Heritage Museum
- de Havilland Aircraft Museum
- Midland Air Museum
- Royal Air Force Museum Cosford
- Shuttleworth Collection
- Vintage Flying Museum
- Queensland Air Museum, Caloundra, Australia
- Historical Aircraft Restoration Society, Albion Park, New South Wales, Australia - a part-sectioned engine is on display
- Technical University of Madrid
- University of Hertfordshire - De Havilland Campus
- University of Porto - Faculty of Engineering

== Survivors ==
As of June 2011, two Goblin-powered de Havilland Vampires remain airworthy on the British register.

As of December 2014, three Goblin-powered de Havilland Vampires remain airworthy in North America. N115DH is owned by the World Heritage Air Museum., C-FJRH is operated under the Jet Aircraft Museum in Ontario, Canada. and N593RH is owned by Vampire Aviation LLC.

As of November 2015, three Goblin-powered de Havilland Vampires remain airworthy in South Africa. Serial number 276 and 277 are in the SA Air Force Museum and the third is at Wonderboom Airport.

== Specifications (D.H Goblin II D.Gn 27) ==
Data from Smith

==== General characteristics ====
- Type: Turbojet
- Length: 107 in (2,700 mm)
- Diameter: 50 in (1,300 mm)
- Dry weight: 1,550 lb (700 kg)

==== Components ====
- Compressor: single-sided, centrifugal flow
- Combustors: 16 chambers
- Turbine: single stage axial flow
- Fuel type: kerosene
- Oil system: metered pressure spray at 50 psi (3.4 bar), dry sump

==== Performance ====
- Maximum thrust: 3,000 lbf (13 kN) at 10,200 rpm at sea level
- Overall pressure ratio: 3.3:1
- Air mass flow: 60 lb/s (27 kg/s) at 17,000 rpm
- Turbine inlet temperature: 1,472 °F (800 °C)
- Fuel consumption: 3,720 lb/hr (465 imp gal/hr), (1,687 kg/hr) or (2,114 L/hr)
- Specific fuel consumption: 1.18 lb/(lbf⋅h) (33 g/(kN⋅s))
- Thrust-to-weight ratio: 1.9

== See also ==
Related development

- Allison J33
- de Havilland Ghost

Related lists

- List of aircraft engines
