= Power Jets =

Defunct British jet engine manufacturer

Power Jets Ltd
- Company type: Limited company
- Industry: Aircraft jet engines
- Founded: 27 January 1936
- Founder: Sir Frank Whittle
- Defunct: 1948
- Fate: Merged with RAE forming NGTE Pyestock
- Headquarters: Rugby, Warwickshire (initially in 1936); Lutterworth (from January 1938)
- Area served: UK
- Key people: James Collingwood Tinling, Sir William Hawthorne
- Products: Gas turbines
- Services: Gas turbine research
- Divisions: Whetstone

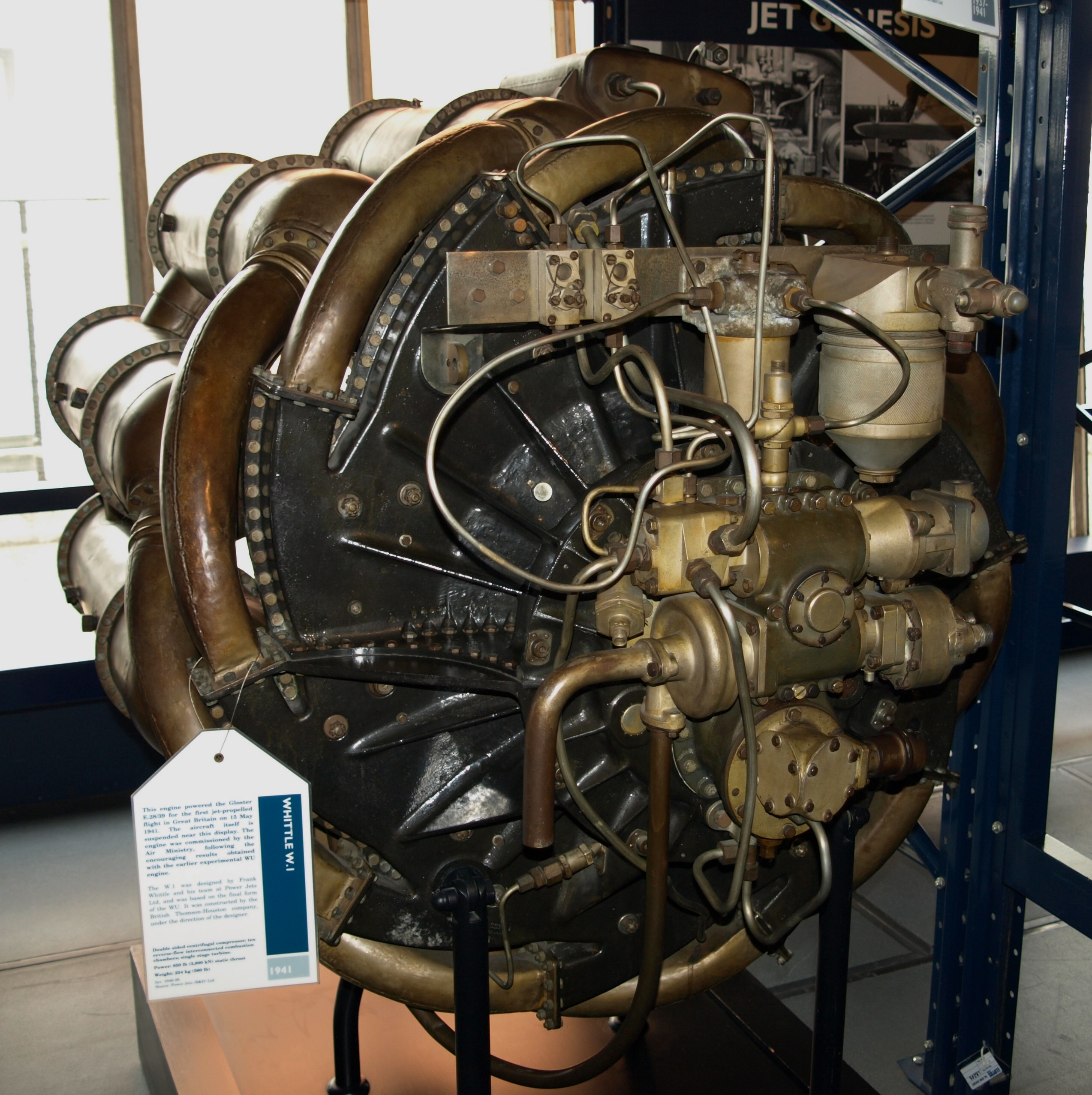
Preserved Power Jets W.1 at the Science Museum (London)

Power Jets was a British company set up by Frank Whittle for the purpose of designing and manufacturing jet engines. The company was nationalised in 1944, and evolved into the National Gas Turbine Establishment.

== History ==
The origins of Power Jets is closely tied with the pioneering work of the British inventor Frank Whittle. Whittle had been exploring the use of gas turbines as a form of propulsion since the 1920s, having been awarded his first patent on such an engine design in 1930. On 27 January 1936, Power Jets was founded; it initially consisted of Whittle, Rolf Dudley-Williams, James Collingwood Tinling, and Lancelot Law Whyte of investment bankers O T Falk & Partners. At this point, there was no official backing of the company from any government ministry. Securing funding was a persistently worrying issue throughout the early development of the engine.

Initial premises for the firm were hired from British Thomson-Houston (BTH) at Rugby, Warwickshire. In addition to the founder members, the company initially 'borrowed' some fitters from BTH to assist in the project; later on, Power Jets was able to get 'one or two' people on loan from the Royal Air Force. During 1938, Power Jets had relocated from Rugby to BTH's works in Lutterworth. By the beginning of 1940, the company had a total workforce of about twenty five.

A major breakthrough for the company came in 1940 when at the prompting of Stanley Hooker, Ernest Hives, chairman of Rolls-Royce, visited Lutterworth, and offered to make any parts Whittle required at Rolls-Royce's Derby experimental shop. Prior to this, Power Jets had often been dismissed by potential British industrial suppliers; when Whittle discussed the requirements for his combustion chamber with various exhibitors at the British Industries Fair, many were simply unprepared to tackle the difficult problem of combustion. One British company, called High Duty Alloys, produced special aluminium alloys under the trade name Hiduminium that proved to be ideal for operating within the conditions inside a jet compressor. For his part, Whittle also sought to keep his engine designs as simple as possible in order to reduce manufacturing complexity.

The Power Jets WU "First Model", also known by Whittle as the first "experimental" engine, and the "1st edition", was the first turbojet engine to be built and run in the world. As an experimental proof-of-concept engine, it was never intended for flight, and was designed to be very light in comparison to typical engineering standards. Whittle designed the centrifugal compressor to develop about 4:1 pressure ratio when, as far as he was aware, the best previously demonstrated performance in a single stage was about 2.5:1. By the end of 1936, total expenditure on design and manufacture of the engine amounted to £2,000. The WU was test run for the first time on 12 April 1937. While the WU engine was running trials in early 1937; support for its development emerged from both Sir Henry Tizard, chairman of the Aeronautical Research Committee, and the Air Ministry.

Work on the WU engine was discontinued in 1941, by which point it had already been superseded by a newer engine design, the Power Jets W.1, which (amongst other attributes) was to be flightworthy. It was selected to power the Gloster E.28/39, the first jet aircraft to fly in the United Kingdom. Power Jets and Gloster had quickly formed a good working relationship around mid-1939 to produce such an aircraft. Ground testing of a non-flightworthy version of the W.1, installed in the E.28/39, begun on 7 April 1941; the aircraft flew under jet power for the first time on 15 May 1941. Increasingly refined versions of the W.1 engine were provisioned and installed upon the E.28/39 prototypes throughout the flight test programme. The success of the E.28/39 proved the viability of jet propulsion, encouraging Gloster to press ahead with designs for a production fighter aircraft.

In 1941, experiments with boosting the W.1's thrust by introducing a liquid coolant were initiated, the first fluid tried being liquid ammonia which proved too effective, resulting in the engine over-speeding and pushing the thrust and rpm indicators off the scales, before later trials changed to using water, and water-methanol. A system to trial the technique in the E.28/39 was devised but never fitted. The W.1 was also the first jet engine built in the United States where, as the General Electric I-A, it was the first US-built jet engine to run, and as the production General Electric J31 it powered the Bell P-59A Airacomet.

Development of the Power Jets W.2 was authorised in 1940 in coordination with the Air Ministry's issuing of Specification F.9/40, which called for prototypes of a new twin-engined jet fighter aircraft. The W.2 was intended to be produced by the car manufacturer Rover, however, in late 1942, Rover agreed to exchange their jet engine factory at Barnoldswick, Lancashire for Rolls-Royce's Meteor tank engine factory in Nottingham, with no money changing hands. At the behest of the British government, Rolls-Royce thereupon assumed control of the W.2 project, with Frank Whittle and his small team at Power Jets acting in an advisory capacity. The engine, which entered production as the Welland, would be a key milestone for jet propulsion, powering early versions of the Gloster Meteor, the Allies' first operational jet fighter.

The W.2B/500 design was modified by Rover as the Rover B.26; following its transfer to Rolls-Royce and further re-design, entered service as the Derwent, which was the effective successor to the Welland. Power Jets and Rolls-Royce closely collaborated on the Derwent's development; such was the confidence of Rolls-Royce's engineers in the performance of the Derwent 5 that the engine proceeded to production straight from the drawing board in advance of any practice testing. The Derwent engine, and the re-designed Derwent V based on the Nene, was installed on many of the later production Gloster Meteors; the adoption of this new powerplant led to considerable performance increases.

After initial suggestions in 1939 by the Engine Department of the Royal Aircraft Establishment (RAE), the latter's Pyestock Section experimented with the technique of injecting fuel into the engine's exhaust nozzle, later known as reheat, and this technique was further refined after Power Jets and the personnel from Pyestock had been amalgamated. Reheat was later flight trialled in the W.2/700 engines in a Meteor I. The technique increased the Meteor's speed by 30-40 mph. The same engine was also trialled with an aft ducted fan.

During late 1943, the British government initiated a supersonic research programme aimed at producing an aircraft that would attain speeds of up to 1,000 MPH. This aircraft, the Miles M.52, was intended to be powered by a version of the Power Jets W.2/700. This engine was estimated to be initially capable of providing 2,000 lb of thrust, while calculated to be only capable of providing subsonic performance in level flight, when flown in a shallow dive it would be capable of transonic flight. In order to get the M.52 to achieve supersonic speeds, further development of the W.2/700 engine would have been undertaken. However, neither this engine nor the aircraft would be completed as intended as the government ordered work to be halted in February 1946.

In January 1944, the existing of the jet engine, and Power Jets' role in its development, was made public for the first time in the printed press. On 28 March 1944, following discussions with the Air Ministry, Whittle reluctantly agreed to the nationalisation of Power Jets Ltd. for £135,000, and the company became Power Jets (Research and Development) Ltd. Shortly after the end of the Second World War, the company was merged with the Turbine Division of the Royal Aircraft Establishment (RAE) at Farnborough, to form the National Gas Turbine Establishment (NGTE Pyestock). During February 1946, around the same time as the termination of the M.52's development, Whittle resigned from Power Jets and stated that it was due to his disagreement with the British government's official policies. The last remnants of the company were disestablished in 1948.

During 1951, Power Jets' successor received $4,000,000 (£1,428,600) from the US Government in advance payment for American use of some 200 Power Jets Whittle gas turbine patents for the next 20 years. Previously, patent fees payable by the US had been waived by Power Jets for the duration of the war.

== Products ==
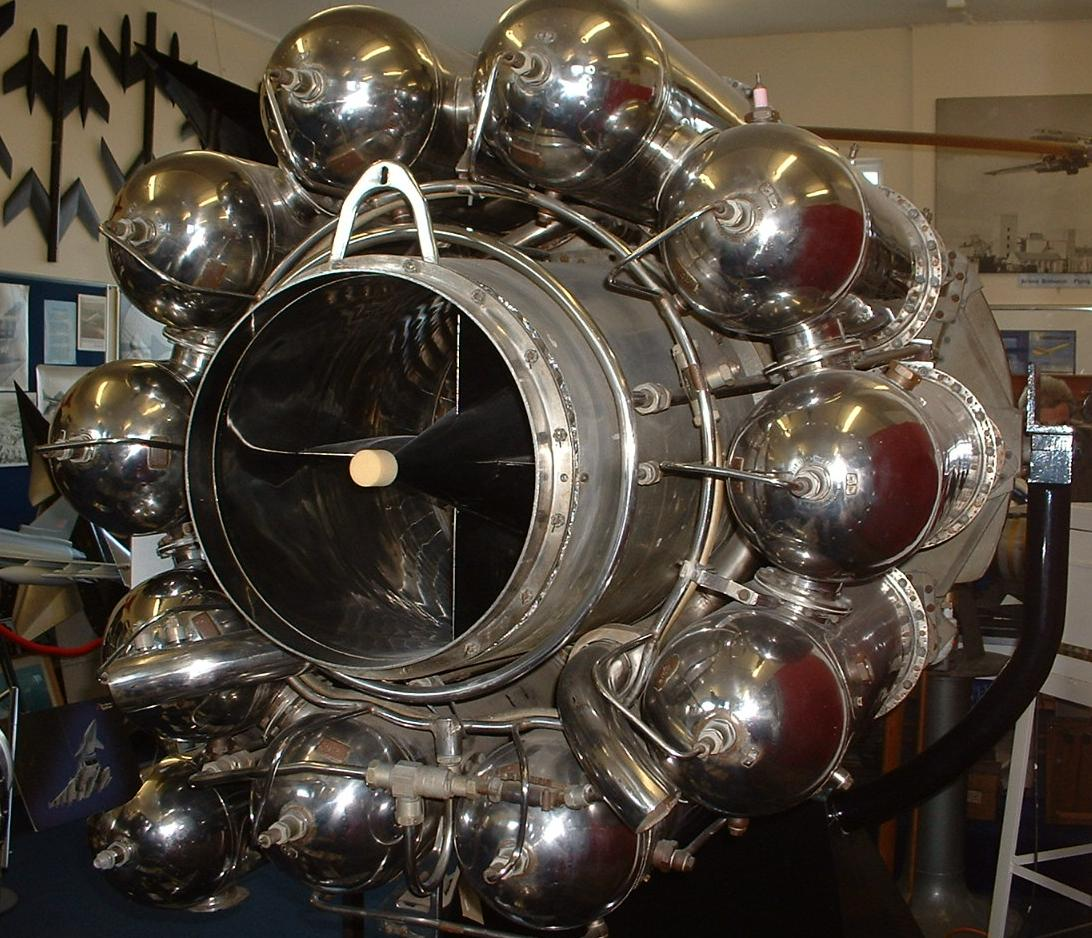
The Power Jets W.2/700 engine flew in the Gloster E.28/39, the first British aircraft to fly with a turbojet engine, and the Gloster Meteor - the light-brown object in the middle of the jetpipe is a cork intended to prevent museum visitors from hurting themselves on the sharp, pointed end, of the turbine fairing

- Power Jets WU: WU abbreviation for Whittle Unit. Series of three experimental test bed engines used to develop the concept of a jet engine. Poor cash flow meant parts were often cannibalised from the previous version.
- Power Jets W.1: First engine actually designed to fly. Double entry compressor, reverse flow combustor, single-stage axial turbine and convergent nozzle engine configuration. Built by British Thomson-Houston. Propelled Gloster E.28/39 demonstrator aircraft on first flight and subsequent demonstration flights.
- Power Jets WR.1: Co-design with Rolls-Royce (RR) using Power Jets components and RR compressor.
- Power Jets W.1X: Single unit assembled from W.1 spare parts, but not deemed airworthy. Used for taxiing trials (and initial "hop") of Gloster E.28/39. Unit then flown to States to assist General Electric to produce the first US manufactured jet engine. W.1X was the first jet engine to run in the United States.
- Power Jets W.2: More powerful version of W.1, retaining the same basic configuration.
- Power Jets W.2B: Rover developed version of W2, which after further development as the W.2B/23 went into production as the Rolls-Royce Welland 1. Propelled early versions of the Gloster Meteor The W.2B also formed the basis of the first GE manufactured jet engine, the General Electric I-A.
- Power Jets W.2/500: Revised W.2B. First Power Jets design to meet its design speed on first test run. W.2/500 and Rover B26 formed basis for the straight-through combustor Rolls-Royce Derwent 1, which powered later marks of the Meteor.
- Power Jets W.2/700: Improved version of W.2/500 with important changes to the compressor impeller, diffuser and blower casing. Finally attained Whittle's aim of 80% efficiency at a pressure ratio of 4:1.
- Power Jets W.3X: Straight-through design. Not built
- 250-500 shp turboprop taken up by Coventry Climax as the C.P.35

== See also ==
- Alan Arnold Griffith
