= General Electric I-A =

American turbojet engine

I-A
- Type: Turbojet
- National origin: United States
- Manufacturer: General Electric
- First run: April 18, 1942
- Number built: 30
- Developed from: Power Jets W.2
- Developed into: General Electric J31

The General Electric I-A was the first working jet engine in the United States, manufactured by General Electric (GE) and achieving its first run on April 18, 1942.

The engine was the result of receiving an imported Power Jets W.1X that was flown to the US from Britain in 1941, and the I-A itself was based on the design of the improved Power Jets W.2B, the plans of which were also received. Like these designs, the I-A engine was also of centrifugal design.

The I-A engine led directly to the first production US jet engine, the General Electric J31 which powered the first US jet aircraft, the Bell XP-59A Airacomet.

== Design and development ==
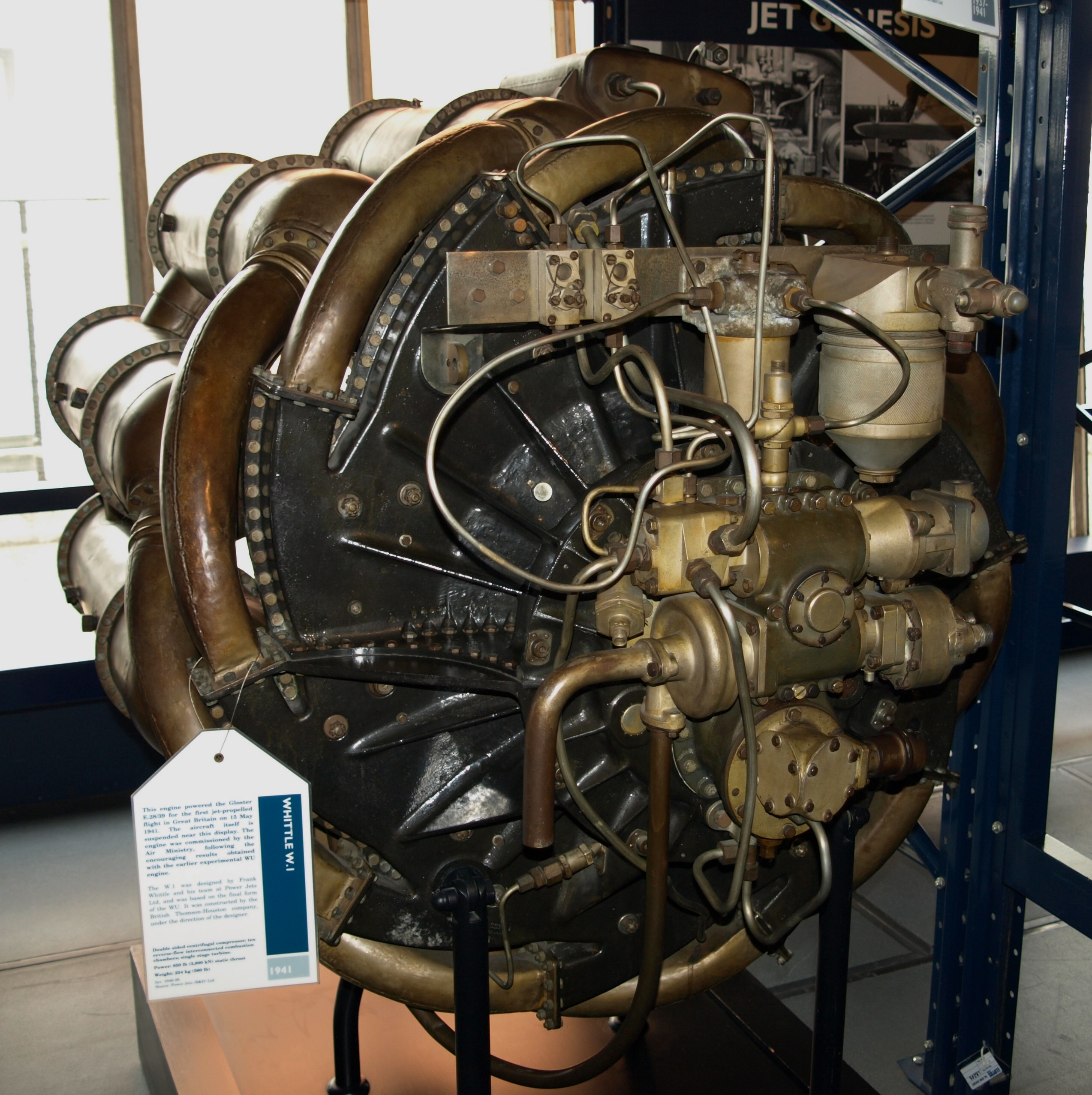
Front view of the preserved Power Jets W.1 at the Science Museum (London) The almost identical W.1X is preserved at the Smithsonian Institution, Washington, DC.

During the late 1930s/early 1940s, a small company in England, known as Power Jets, had been developing, through a series of prototypes, a gas turbine engine to provide aircraft jet propulsion. Power Jets had been started by a Frank Whittle, who had thought of the concept of a jet engine whilst he was a young flight cadet at RAF Cranwell. He applied for a patent for the engine in January, 1930, although he eventually allowed the patent to lapse.

Power Jets Ltd was formed in March 1936. Manufacture of key engine components was undertaken by the British Thomson-Houston Company (BTH), starting in June 1936. Testing of the first engine, the WU, to demonstrate the concept, commenced on April 12, 1937. Because of a shortage of funds at Power Jets, engine components were in short supply, so development proceeded at a very slow pace.

However, in the summer of 1939, shortly before war was declared, the Air Ministry suddenly realised that the jet engine was likely to become a viable means of propulsion. As a result, Power Jets received a contract for a flight engine on July 12, 1939. Shortly afterwards, a contract was placed with Gloster Aircraft Company to produce an experimental aircraft to demonstrate the engine.

In May 1941, the first British jet aircraft, Gloster E.28/39, made its maiden flight. It was powered by the 860 lbf (3.8 kN) thrust Power Jets W.1. Prior to this first flight another engine known as the W.1X had been used in the prototype aircraft for taxiing trials. This particular one-off engine had been assembled from a collection of spare parts and was not considered flightworthy.

After a visit to England mid-1941, General Henry H. Arnold was so impressed by flight demonstrations of the Gloster E.28/39 he had witnessed that he arranged for the Whittle W.1X turbojet engine to be flown in October 1941 to the U.S in the bomb bay of a USAAC Consolidated B-24 Liberator, along with drawings for the more powerful W.2B/23 engine and a small team of Power Jets engineers, so that the US could develop its own jet engine. As a result, General Electric received a contract from U.S Army Air Corps to build a turbojet based on the W.2B/23. General Electric's extensive experience in turbocharger production made them the natural choice for producing such engine. With utmost secrecy, in October 1941 a small dedicated GE team at the River Works plant in Lynn, Massachusetts, began the intensive development of the first US jet engine. GE initially referred to their engine as the Type I. Engine component production was undertaken fairly openly, but the project reference "Type I Supercharger" was used to disguise the true application of the parts.

The aerodynamic design and many mechanical features of the Type I were identical to that of the W.2B/23. However, there were some major differences, principally with the design of the wheelcase, which was brought into line with the US practice of mounting engine accessories on the engine itself.

In November 1941, well before the Type I would become available for testing, General Electric started ground running of the Power Jets W.1X engine. This was the first jet engine to run on US soil, but more importantly GE gained valuable experience of testing a turbojet engine.

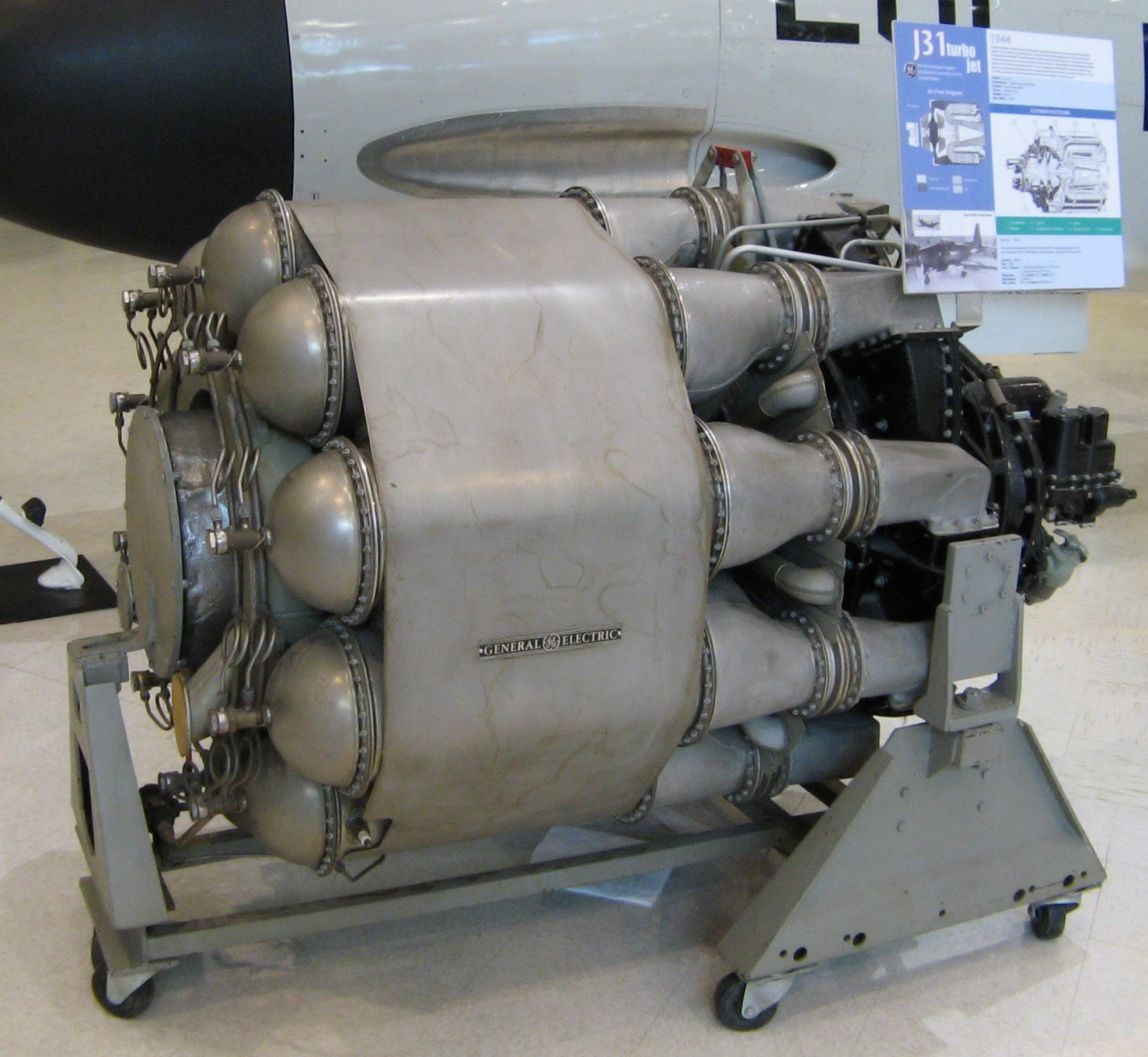
The production General Electric J31. The rear of the engine is at left of the picture.

On April 18, 1942, twenty-eight weeks after stateside work began, GE's engineers successfully ran the first Type I engine. True, the unit stalled before full engine speed was obtained, but this reflected British experience with the W.2B.

With their vast experience of developing turbochargers, General Electric turned their expertise to improving the Type I. A modified version, the Type I-A, incorporating partitions in the blower casing to separate the air flow into each of the individual combustion chambers at the suggestion of Whittle, began testing on May 18, 1942, and developed a thrust of 1,250 lbf (5.6 kN), at an overall pressure ratio of 3:1.

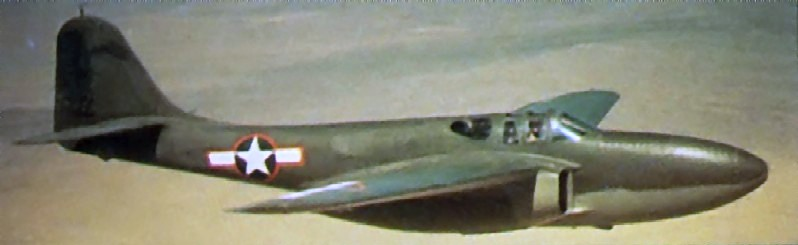
P-59A Airacomet with the short-lived red outlined National markings (June 1943 to September 1943)

On October 1, 1942, a Bell XP-59A aircraft, powered by two 1,250 lbf thrust I-A turbojet engines, made its first flight at the Muroc Army Air Field in California. Further engine developments produced a 1,400 lbf (6.2 kN) thrust engine, known as the I-14, which was used to propel the service test YP-59A aircraft.

Ultimately, General Electric found they could produce a thrust of 1,610 lbf (7.2 kN) from a package the same size and weight as the I-A, which they called the I-16. Later, when the P-59 went into production, the aircraft was fitted with J31s, which was the USAAF designation for the I-16.

Meanwhile, Power Jets continued to develop the W.2B, initially with the help of the Rover Company. On April 1, 1943, Rolls-Royce took responsibility for developing the engine, and it went into small-scale production as the 1,600 lbf thrust Rolls-Royce Welland I in October, 1943. The Gloster Meteor I fighter, which entered RAF service in July, 1944, was powered by the Welland I.

== Variants ==
- Type I

Initial design based on W.1X. Incorporated automatic control system and forged Hastelloy B turbine blades. First run on 18th April 1942.

- Type I-A

Revised design incorporating partitions in blower casing at suggestion of Whittle.

== Applications ==
- Bell XP-59A

== Engines on display ==
The W.1X is on display at the Smithsonian Institution, Washington DC.

I-1A on display at Valiant Air Command - Titusville Florida

== Specifications (General Electric I-A) ==
==== General characteristics ====
- Type: Centrifugal compressor turbojet, single shaft
- Length: 70.5 in (1791mm)
- Diameter: 44 in (1118mm)
- Dry weight: 780lb (354kg)

==== Components ====
- Compressor: Single-stage double-sided centrifugal
- Combustors: 10 reverse-flow can
- Turbine: Single-stage axial
- Fuel type: Kerosene

==== Performance ====
- Maximum thrust: 1,250 lbf (5.6 kN)
- Overall pressure ratio: 3:1
- Thrust-to-weight ratio: 1.6

== See also ==
Related development

- General Electric J31
- Power Jets W.1
- Power Jets W.2
- Rolls-Royce Welland

Comparable engines

- de Havilland Goblin

Related lists

- List of aircraft engines
