= Power Jets WU =

WU
- Type: Turbojet
- Manufacturer: Power Jets
- First run: 12 April 1937
- Major applications: none
- Number built: 3
- Developed into: Power Jets W.1

The Power Jets WU (Whittle Unit) was a series of three very different experimental jet engines produced and tested by Frank Whittle and his small team in the late 1930s.

== Design and development ==
The WU "First Model", also known by Whittle as the first "experimental" engine, and the "1st edition", was the first turbojet engine to be built and run in the world. Although an experimental engine and not intended for flight it was designed to be very light by normal engineering standards. The engine had four basic components: a single stage centrifugal compressor with double-sided impeller, a single straight-through combustion chamber, a single stage, axial flow turbine and a convergent propelling nozzle attached to a jet pipe. The shaft connecting the turbine to the compressor was made as short as possible to avoid whirling. The combustion chamber was connected to the compressor outlet by a very large single spiral duct giving the engine an asymmetrical appearance.

Whittle designed the centrifugal compressor to develop about 4:1 pressure ratio when, as far as he was aware, the best previously demonstrated performance in a single stage was about 2.5:1. He specified a double sided impeller to give his required air flow from a smaller diameter impeller than could be obtained from a single-sided one. The smaller impeller allowed a higher turbine speed which reduced the loading on the single stage turbine and improved its efficiency. The 16.5 in (419 mm) diameter turbine had to develop 3,000 hp (2,237 kW) to drive the compressor. One disadvantage of a double-sided impeller is the requirement, in an aircraft installation, for an intake with a plenum with its higher pressure losses. A disadvantage for the design of the rotor thrust bearing is no axial load from the impeller to balance that from the turbine.

Whittle sought help in designing the combustion system and had visited the British Industries Fair. When he discussed the requirements for his combustion chamber with various exhibitors he had been "practically laughed off every stand" until he discovered Laidlaw, Drew and Company, a firm prepared to tackle the difficult problem of combustion at intensities 20x those in refractory-lined industrial applications. By the end of 1936 total expenditure on design and manufacture of the engine amounted to £2,000.

Testing of the first model started on 12 April 1937 at Rugby. During the testing the British Thomson-Houston (BTH) Chief Engineer considered it unwise to exceed 12,000 r.p.m. in the open factory for safety reasons after a run on 23 August up to 13,600 r.p.m. The 31st and final run was on 24 August 1937.

A significantly different, symmetrical design was adopted for the second model. Ten spiral ducts connected the compressor outlet to a single, large, reverse-flow combustion chamber, the outlet of which discharged forward through the turbine before turning rearwards to exhaust through ten jet pipes. Some heat exchange was expected from the exhaust pipes to the ten ducts delivering air to the combustion chamber as they were all enclosed by the outer casing. Testing began with a reconstructed engine at the premises of the BTH's redundant Ladywood foundry at nearby Lutterworth in Leicestershire on 16 April 1938 and continued until the turbine was damaged on 6 May 1938. A third reconstructed engine was ready for testing on 26 October 1938.

Significant changes were also introduced in the third model. It had ten reverse-flow combustion chambers giving a similar configuration to that of the later Power Jets W.1 and Power Jets W.2 turbojet engines. This configuration was also adopted for the Rolls-Royce Welland and General Electric J31 jet engines. One advantage of using 10 combustion chambers, smaller by a factor of (1/sqrt10), was they could be more easily be tested on a combustion rig.

Owing to a shortage of funds, many of the components would be modified or repaired for testing on later engines.

Whittle and his team experienced many problems developing the three models. Compressor and turbine efficiencies and durability were improved. Poor fuel system and combustion performance no longer limited the testing of other parts of the engine. The general design of the follow-on W1 engine was very similar to the third model of the experimental engine. The team demonstrated that the turbojet had the potential to compete with the large reciprocating aero-engines then being mass-produced for the UK Re-armament Programme.

The initial rounded "bulb" de Laval-type turbine blade root fixing was later replaced with a new triangular "fir-tree" design after repeated stress/fatigue failures of the earlier type. The "fir-tree" design would be used on all Whittle's subsequent engines.

After severe initial combustion problems, in late 1940 a new design of combustion chamber designed by Isaac Lubbock of the Shell Fulham Laboratory was incorporated. This 'Lubbock' chamber/burner proved the answer to many of the combustion problems.

The reverse-flow type of combustion chamber, as implemented on the third engine, was necessary to allow the continued use of the more expensive components, e.g. rotor assembly, which had been designed for the completely different straight-through combustion chamber used on the first engine. The reverse-flow arrangement had no thermal expansion problems, it allowed the continued use of a very short shaft between the impeller and turbine, the end covers at the rear of the chambers could be easily removed for inspection and modifications to the combustor components.

Whittle had assumed the use of vortex flow in the turbine blades however BTH engineers had not incorporated this and had manufactured the blades with insufficient twist. Whittle's subsequent insistence on this subsequently led to deteriorating relations with BTH engineers.

The WU was effectively destroyed by turbine disc failure on 22 February 1941. Work continued with the Power Jets W.1.

== Variants ==
WU First Model Experimental Engine
Initial design with asymmetric spiral duct connecting compressor outlet to single straight-through combustion chamber. First run 12 April 1937

Design Data

- Airflow: ~25.7 lb/s (~11.66 kg/s)
- Shaft Speed: 17750rpm (296rev/s)
- Turbine Power Output: ~2950 hp (~2200 kW)
- Compressor Impeller Diameter: ~19.69in (~500mm)
- Compressor Impeller Tip Speed: ~1525 ft/s (~465 m/s)
- Turbine Tip Diameter:~15.75in (~400mm)
- Turbine Tip Speed: ~1220 ft/s (~372 m/s)

WU Second Model Experimental Engine
single reverse-flow combustion chamber. First run 16 April 1938

WU Third Model Experimental Engine
Ten reverse-flow combustion chambers. First run 26 October 1938

== Applications ==
None.

== Specifications (WU First Model Design Assumptions, performance not actually achieved) ==
==== General characteristics ====
- Type: Centrifugal flow turbojet
- Length: ~67.2 in (~1707 mm) excluding jet pipe
- Diameter: ~45 in (~1143 mm) across compressor
- Dry weight:

==== Components ====
- Compressor: single-stage centrifugal with 19-inch diameter double-sided impeller, diffuser vanes installed part way through testing, material: Hiduminium RR 56
- Combustors: single straight through design, located immediately downstream of elbow in spiral pipe
- Turbine: 14-inch diameter with 66 blades (BTH non-vortex design), single stage axial flow, with no nozzle guide vanes, material of disc and blades: Firth-Vickers Stayblade
- Fuel type: Kerosene

==== Performance ====
- Maximum thrust: ~1,389 lbf (~6.18 kN)
- Overall pressure ratio: ~4.4:1
- Air mass flow: ~26lb/s (~11.79 kg/s)
- Turbine inlet temperature: ~1434 F (~779 C)
- Specific fuel consumption: 0.942 lb/hr/lbf (~26.69 g/s/kN)

== See also ==
- Heinkel HeS 1
- Power Jets W.1
- Power Jets W.2
- Rolls-Royce Welland
