= Allison J33 =

Centrifugal-flow turbojet engine

J33
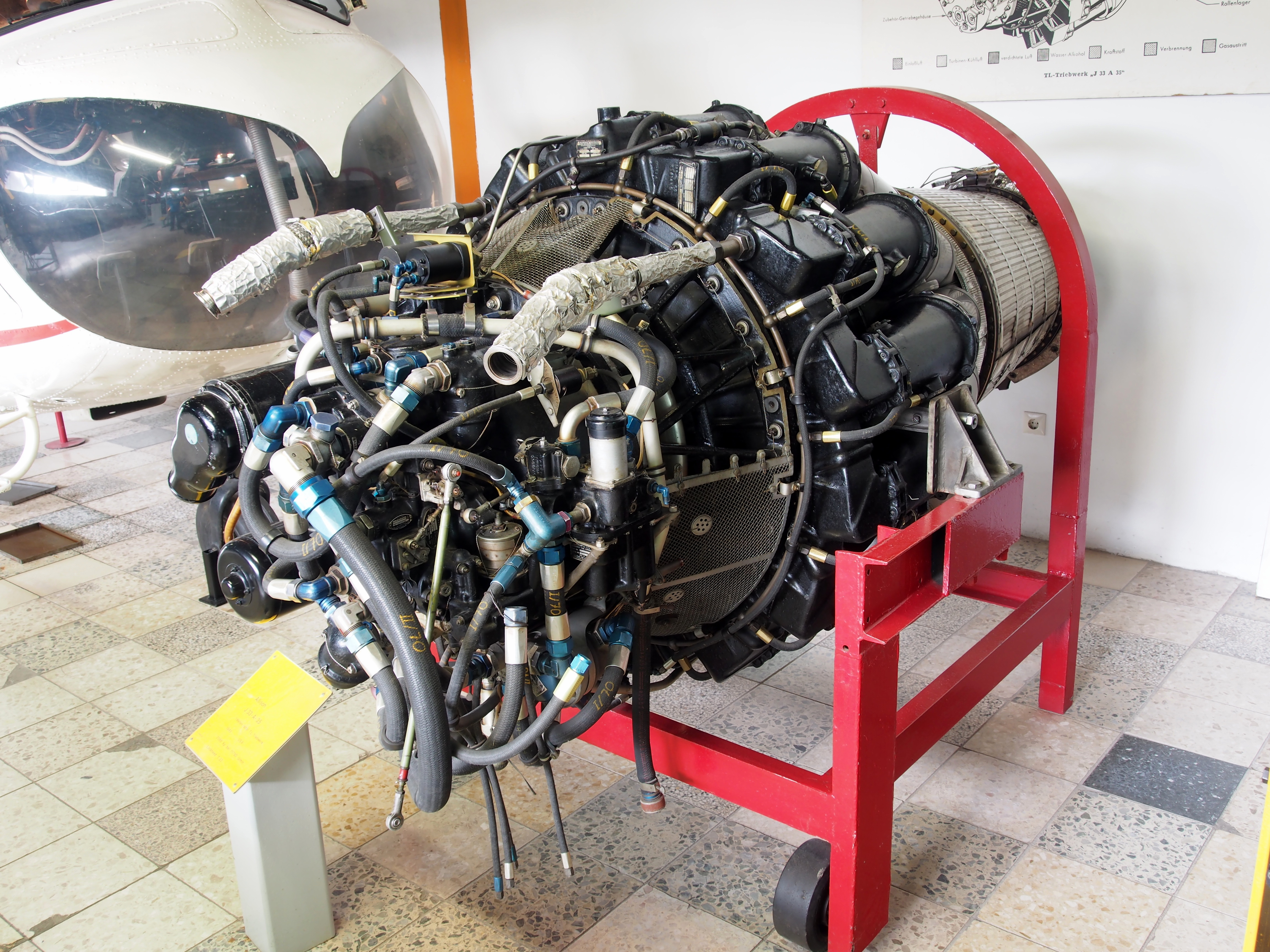
- Allison J33 turbojet engine on display at Flugausstellung Hermeskeil
- Type: Turbojet
- Manufacturer: General Electric; Allison Engine Company
- First run: 1942
- Major applications: Lockheed P-80 Shooting Star; Lockheed T-33 Shooting Star; Lockheed F-94A/B Starfire; SSM-N-8 Regulus
- Developed from: General Electric J31

The General Electric/Allison J33 is an American centrifugal-flow jet engine, a development of the General Electric J31, enlarged to produce significantly greater thrust, starting at 4,000 lbf (18 kN) and ending at 4,600 lbf (20 kN) with an additional low-altitude boost to 5,400 lbf (24 kN) with water-alcohol injection.

== Development ==
The J33 was originally developed by General Electric as a follow-on to their work with the designs of Frank Whittle during World War II. Their first engine was known as the General Electric I-A, but after major changes to adapt it to US production and to increase thrust, it started limited production as the I-16 in 1942, the 16 referring to its 1,600 lbf (7.1 kN) thrust. Full production started as the J31 when the United States Army Air Forces introduced common naming for all their engine projects.

Along with the I-16, GE also started work on an enlarged version, known as the I-40. As the name implied, the engine was designed to provide 4,000 lbf (18 kN). Apart from size, the main difference between I-16 and the I-40 was the combustion system: the I-16 had ten reverse-flow cans, whereas the I-40 had 14 straight-through combustors. The development cycle was remarkably rapid. Design work started in mid-1943 and the first prototype underwent static testing on 13 January 1944.

Lockheed was in the midst of the XP-80 project at the time, originally intending to power their design with a US-produced version of the Halford H-1 of about 3,000 lbf (13 kN). Production of the H-1 by Allis-Chalmers ran into delays, and since the I-40 would dramatically improve performance, plans were made to fit the prototypes with the I-40 instead.

The I-40 became important to the USAAF's plans when the I-16 powered P-59 was skipped over in favor of the I-40 powered P-80 as the US's first production jet fighter. In 1945, the license to actually produce the engine was not given to General Electric, but to Allison instead. Allison, working largely from government-owned wartime factories, could produce the engine in quantity more quickly and cheaply.

By the time the production lines were shut down, Allison had built over 6,600 J33's and General Electric another 300 (mostly the early runs).

In 1958, surplus J33s were used in jet donkeys pushing dead loads at 200 knots to test aircraft carrier arresting gear cables and tailhooks at Lakehurst.

A model of the J33 intended for civil use, designated the Allison 400-C4, in 1948 became the first US gas turbine certificated for commercial transport use.

== Variants ==
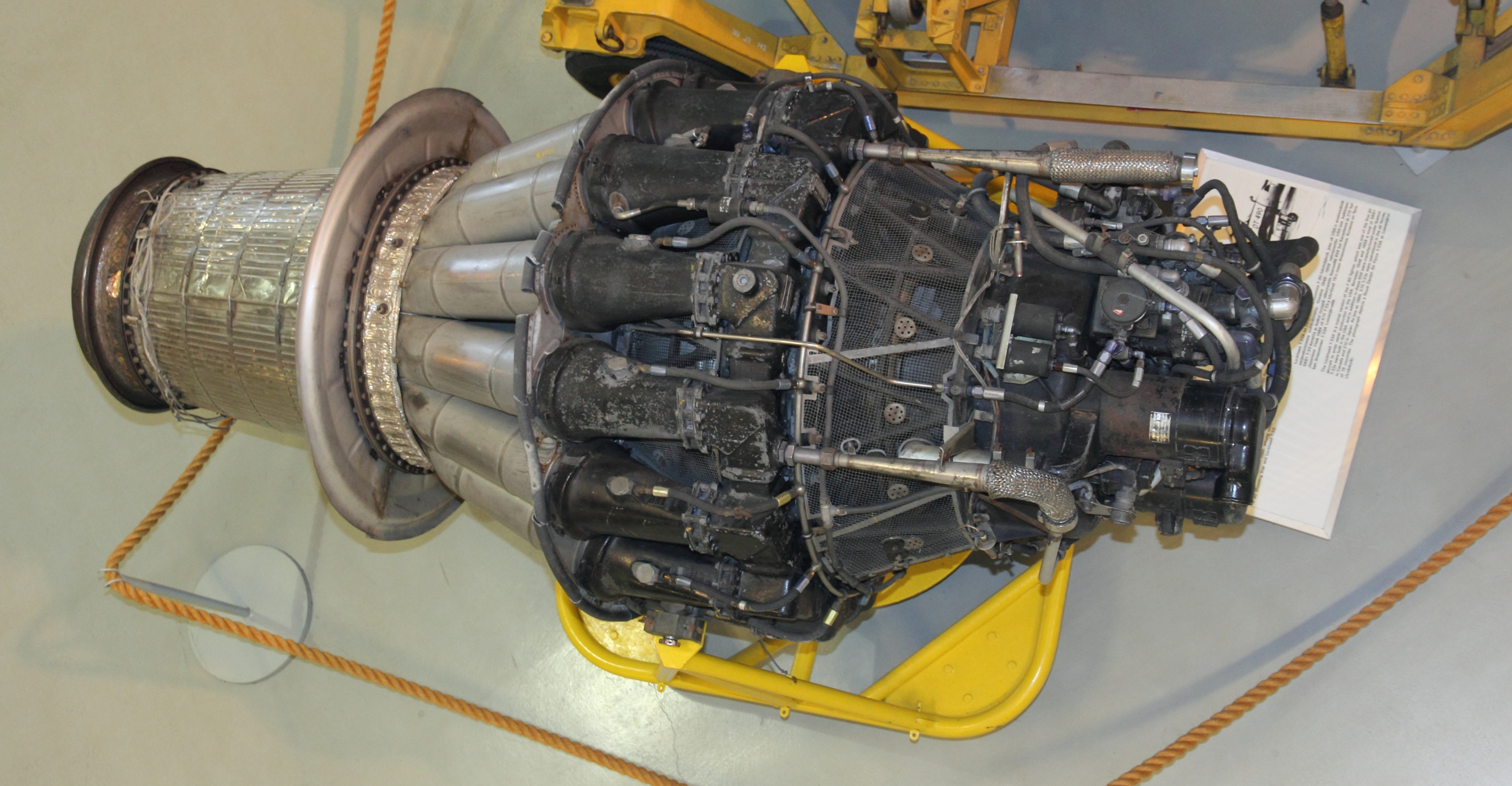
A J33 at the Finnish Air Force Museum

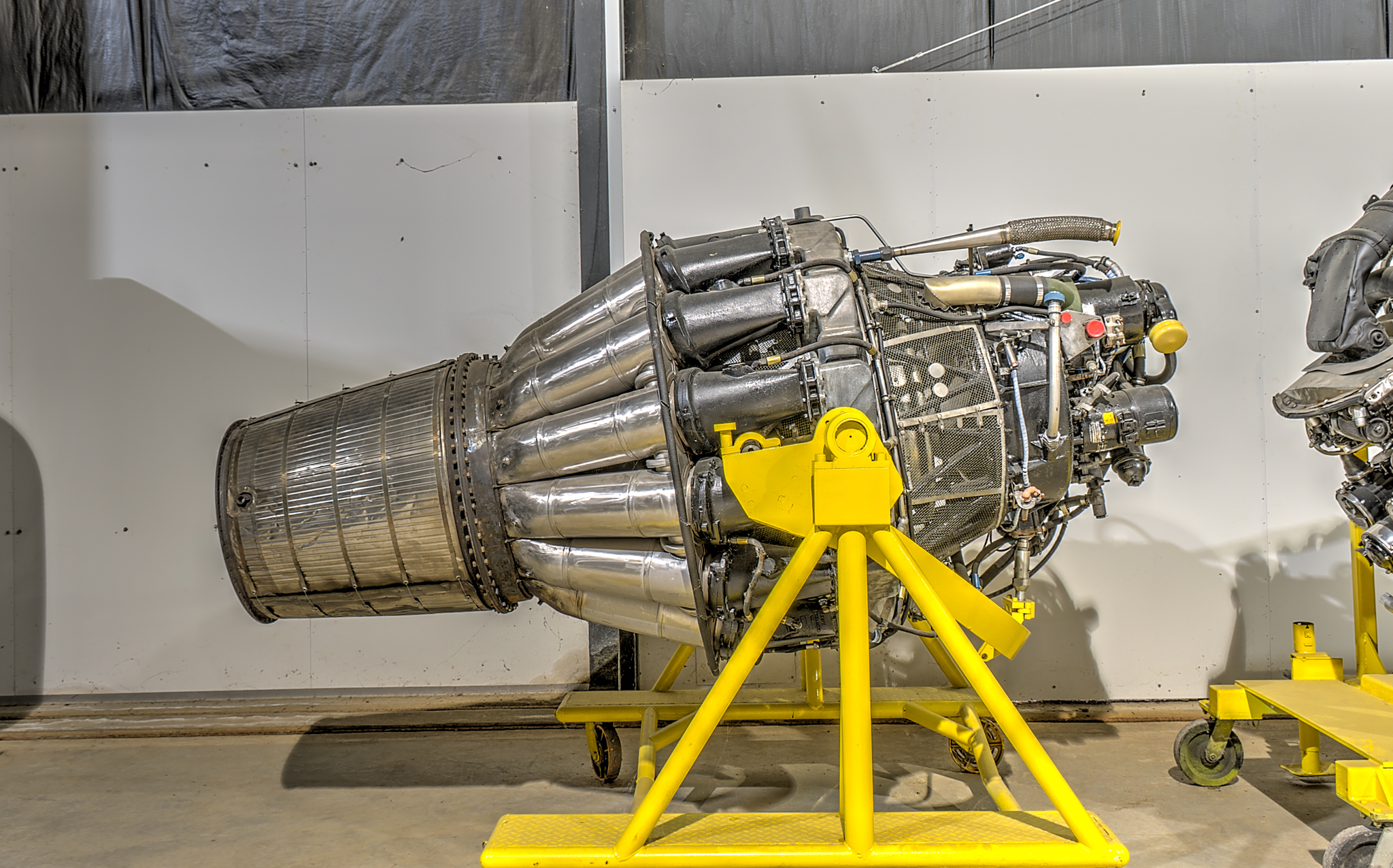
Allison J33 on display at the Museum of Aviation, Robins AFB

Data from: Aircraft engines of the World 1953, Aircraft engines of the World 1957, Aircraft engines of the World 1953,

Thrust given in pounds force (lbf) and kilonewtons (kN).

J33-A-4
similar to -21 without water injection.
J33-A-6
4,600 lbf (20 kN), United States Navy (USN)
J33-A-8
4,600 lbf (20 kN), (USN)
J33-A-10
4,600 lbf (20 kN), powered the Martin P4M Mercator and North American AJ Savage. Used as mixed propulsion engine system with the P&W R-4360 (P4M), and with the P&W R-2800 Double Wasp (AJ).
J33-A-14
4,600 lbf (20.46 kN), short life engine, powered the Chance-Vought Regulus
J33-A-16
5,850 lbf (26.02 kN), similar to the -16A
J33-A-16A
5,400 lbf (24.02 kN), powered the Grumman F9F-7
J33-A-17
similar to -21 without water injection
J33-A-17A
J33-A-18A
short life engine, powered the Chance-Vought Regulus
J33-A-20
J33-A-21
4,500 lbf (20.02 kN)
J33-A-22
with bleed air for boundary-layer control, powered the Lockheed T2V-1
J33-A-23
4,600 lbf (20.46 kN), similar to -35
J33-A-24
6,100 lbf (27.13 kN), powered the Lockheed T2V
J33-A-24A
6,100 lbf (27.13 kN), powered the Lockheed T2V
J33-A-25
similar to -35
J33-A-27
similar to the -16A, United States Air Force (USAF)
J33-A-29
8,200 lbf (36.48 kN) with re-heat, powered the Convair XF-92
J33-A-31
similar to -35
J33-A-33
6,000 lbf (26.69 kN) with re-heat, powered the Lockheed F-94A Starfire
J33-A-35
4,600 lbf (20.46 kN) / 5,400 lbf (24.02 kN) with water-alcohol injection, powered the Lockheed F-80C Shooting Star, Lockheed T2V and Lockheed T-33
J33-A-37
4,600 lbf (20.46 kN) thrust, short life engine, powered the Martin Matador
J33-A-41
5,200 lbf (23.13 kN), likely a short life engine, powered the Martin Mace
Model 400-C4
Company designation, for commercial use, similar to J33-A-21.
Model 400-C5
Company designation of J33-A-23.
Model 400-C13
Company designation of the -35
Model 400-D9
Company designation of the -33

== Applications ==
- Convair XF-92
- Lockheed P-80 Shooting Star
- Lockheed T-33 Shooting Star
- Lockheed F-94A / F-94B Starfire
- Lockheed T2V SeaStar
- North American AJ Savage
- Martin P4M Mercator
- Martin MGM-1 Matador
- Martin MGM-13 Mace
- Vought SSM-N-8 Regulus

== Engines on display ==
- A J33 is on public display at the City of Norwich Aviation Museum in Horsham St Faith, Norfolk.

== Specifications (Allison J33-A-35) ==
Data from Jane's all the World's Aircraft 1955–56 and Aircraft engines of the World 1957.

==== General characteristics ====
- Type: centrifugal compressor turbojet with water injection
- Length: 107 in (271.8 cm)
- Diameter: 50.5 in (128.3 cm)
- Dry weight: 1,820 lb (830 kg)

==== Components ====
- Compressor: single-stage double-sided centrifugal compressor
- Combustors: 14 can type stainless steel combustion chambers
- Turbine: single-stage axial
- Fuel type: JP-4, Kerosene (AN-F-32) or 100/130 gasoline
- Oil system: wet sump, pressure spray at 42 psi (2.9 bar)

==== Performance ====
- Maximum thrust: 4,600 lbf (20 kN) static dry at 11,750 rpm at sea level for take-off

Take-off thrust, static wet: 5,400 lbf (24 kN) at 11,750 rpm at sea level
Normal thrust, static: 3,900 lbf (17 kN) at 11,000 rpm at sea level

- Overall pressure ratio: 4.4:1
- Air mass flow: 90 lb/s (41 kg/s) at 11,750 rpm
- Turbine inlet temperature: TIT: 1,116.15 K (1,549 °F; 843 °C) ; JPT: 958.15 K (1,265 °F; 685 °C)
- Specific fuel consumption: 1.12 lb/(lbf⋅h) (32 g/(kN⋅s))
- Thrust-to-weight ratio: 2.53

== See also ==
Related development

- General Electric J31

Comparable engines

- de Havilland Ghost
- Rolls-Royce Derwent

Related lists

- List of aircraft engines
