= National Gas Turbine Establishment =

Research and testing facility in Pyestock, England

Coordinates: 51.282957°N 0.807098°W

The National Gas Turbine Establishment (NGTE Pyestock) in Farnborough, part of the Royal Aircraft Establishment (RAE), was the prime site in the UK for the design and development of gas turbine and jet engines. For over 50 years, Pyestock was at the forefront of gas turbine development.

The NGTE came into existence during the mid-1940s, its principal predecessors were Power Jets, a formerly private company headed by Frank Whittle, the inventor of the jet engine, and the RAE turbine development team; the design teams of both entities were incorporated, initially being led by Whittle and Hayne Constant. Upon its creation, it was nationalised and ran as a state-owned entity. A major function of the NGTE was to function as a testing and development centre, both for experimental developments and to support commercial engine companies.

It was decided to base the turbine development site at Pyestock, a former golf course in a secluded wooded spot between Farnborough and Fleet; the location was selected as the NGTE's activities would be top secret, thus there was a need to be at a distance from the general public, the surrounding woodland would also dampen the noise. The first elements of the site began construction began in 1949, initially consisting of small test "cubicles" inside buildings like the Plant House. When the possibility of supersonic jets arose, the site was expanded to the north west; the Air House and several large test cells were built circa 1961. Pyestock was probably the largest site of its kind in the world. Over the next 50 years, the NGTE played a major role in the design and testing of the majority of the British military's jet engines in addition to naval gas turbine engines.

Following the end of the Cold War, the NGTE's activity dipped considerably. In 1995, the organisation was incorporated into the wider Defence Evaluation and Research Agency (DERA). Five years later, NGTE Pyestock was permanently closed and the site itself was decommissioned; it has since been redeveloped into housing, known as Hartland Village.

== History ==
During 1942, the Royal Aircraft Establishment (RAE) Turbine Division moved to new facilities in Pyestock. On 28 March 1944, following discussions with the Air Ministry, Frank Whittle reluctantly agreed to the nationalisation of his company, Power Jets, for £135,000, after which it was merged with the RAE's Turbine Division and renamed as Power Jets (Research and Development) Ltd. That same year, the organisation established its headquarters at Pyestock. Shortly after the end of the Second World War, the organisation was reconstituted as a division of the Ministry of Supply, at which point it was renamed as the National Gas Turbine Establishment, commonly referred to as NGTE Pyestock. During February 1946, Frank Whittle parted ways with NGTE, having resigned from his position after disagreeing with some of the policies being enacted by the British government of the time.

In 1951, the organisation received $4,000,000 (£1,428,600) from the US Government in advance payment for American use of some 200 Power Jets Whittle gas turbine patents over the following 20 years. Prior to this, patent fees payable by the US had been waived by Power Jets for the duration of the Second World War.

For over half a century, prototype engines destined for the British military were designed and tested by the NGTE. The engines of various Royal Air Force combat aircraft of the Cold War era, including the V bombers, Harrier Jump Jet and Panavia Tornado, are believed to have undergone testing at Pyestock. The organisation's efforts were considered to be a key part of Britain's efforts to maintain parity with the military advances that were underway within the Soviet Union. Every gas turbine to be installed in Royal Navy ships was inspected by the NGTE; captured Soviet engines were also discreetly examined.

At its height, 1,600 staff worked at Pyestock while the site itself was of a similar size to that of a small town. It comprised 11 fairly large buildings alongside a multitude of smaller service buildings that typically provided a particular service required by one or more of the other buildings, such as power stations, turbine halls, offices, workshops, laboratories, cooling towers, and treatment plants. Many of the buildings were interconnected with large pipes, the site functioned akin to a single complex entity. A total of five altitude test cells were constructed on site to function as testing environments, being capable of simulating the atmospheric conditions of both subsonic and supersonic flight. These closed loop systems used compressed air generated in a vast turbine hall known as the air house. The power of these facilities were such that speeds of up to Mach 3 and altitudes of up to 70,000 feet could be accurately recreated for several hours at a time.

Even though Pyestock was intentionally kept at a distance from the general public as to better obscure its activities and maintain secrecy, local people would often become aware of the tests being undertaken; some residents that lived miles away from the site have claimed to have witnessed occasional low rumbling roars, and that the lights in their homes would occasionally go dim. and could be heard from up to several miles away. Particularly demanding tests were typically performed at night due to the amount of electricity required, which was drawn from the National Grid. As early as 1957, it is known that early computers, supplied by Elliott Brothers (London) Ltd, were an active component of the engine testing process. Typical data points of these tests included the temperature, fuel flow, and pressure at various points across an engine.

The Admiralty Marine Engineering Establishment (formerly the Admiralty Fuel Experimental Station which developed the Admiralty three-drum boiler) was taken over by the NGTE in 1965. Following the 1971 creation of the Ministry of Defence Procurement Executive, both the Admiralty Engineering Laboratory (1917-1977) and the Admiralty Oil Laboratory (1953-1977) were amalgamated with the NGTE.

The apparent value in the site declined over time, particularly following the end of the Cold War. It has been speculated that, with the progression of time and advancement of new technologies, particularly computer simulations, it had become easier to accurately predict some of the data that had previously required physical testing to gather. The site is believed to have been quite costly to run, thus it appears that the British government had decided to gradually reduce the size of the NGTE and to progressively shut down parts of Pyestock. During 1995, the establishment became part of the Defence Evaluation and Research Agency (DERA). During 2000, the Pyestock site was permanently closed amid preparations for the partial privatisation of DERA.

== The Buildings ==
=== Air House ===
The Air House (1961) was a modernistic structure. Its eastern side is sheet glass; 8 large blue exhaust pipes rise the full length of the building, for the 8 compressor/exhauster sets inside. The pipes transported the fast moving air to/from the test cells.

The Air House had two functions: blowing or sucking air, at up to 2,000 mph (for Cell 4). There were eight identical GEC compressor/exhauster sets which aggregated to 352,000 horsepower, then the largest installation of its kind in the western world.

This is the final design for the compressor/exhauster sets from the late 1950s. They are made up of an in-line arrangement (from left to right) of an 8,000 horsepower steam turbine, then two low-pressure compressors, a high-pressure exhauster, a 27 MW 11 kV synchronous motor that provided 36,000 horsepower, and finally the barring gear and the exciter (a small generator that provides a current needed to start the main motor).

The 8,000 horsepower steam turbine, which was powered by the site's boiler house, gave the compressor sets a kick start before it was synced with the grid. They could also be used whilst they were being run, but this was expensive and only used on the supersonic tests.

=== Cell 3 ===
Cell 3 was mostly underground and was a supersonic replacement of Cell 2, allowing for higher speeds and a greater engine temperature range. There was a fairly large building above ground. But that was just to allow engines to be lowered into the test chamber from a huge crane. The test chamber itself was almost entirely underground.

=== Cell 3 West ===
Cell 3 West was a comparatively small building, with a large blue and white round opening on the front of the test chamber. It was the last altitude test cell built on site. It was one of the largest cells internally, allowing icing tests (testing to see how ice affects a turbine's performance) to be carried out on engines and helicopter rotors. The engine or turbine was suspended from the roof of the cell.

=== Cell 4 ===
The largest test cell on site, Cell 4 was built in 1965, at a cost of £6.5 million, as part of the Concorde programme but also to test other supersonic jet engines. The test cell, unique in the world, takes up most of the steel clad structure with its mass of pipes, blast doors and electronics. It is connected to the Air House by blue pipes and was designed to simulate Concorde's flying conditions - Mach 2 (1522 mph) at 61,000 feet, but could test Concorde's engines at a maximum wind speed of 2,000 mph.

The amount of energy required to run the air house (see below) at the speed needed was too great for the site's own power station, so electricity had to be taken from the National Grid. By the early 1970s, Pyestock had to negotiate with the Central Electricity Generating Board (CEGB) to have enough electricity generated. So as not to strain the grid, Cell 4 could only be powered up at night.

=== Number 9 Exhauster ===
Pyestock's designers built the Air House on a large scale, thinking it could supply adequate suction for the supersonic test cells. But they could not have anticipated the phenomenal force required by Cell 4 - even with all eight exhausters running the suction was insufficient. The solution was to build another exhauster set directly next to Cell 4. As there are eight in the Air House, this one was named number 9.

It is a Parsons "multi-stage axial-flow exhauster". It was used mainly by Cell 4 but also occasionally by Cell 3 and Cell 3 West. It was driven by a 36,000 horsepower synchronous motor, with power being taken first from the site's power station, and then when 3,000 rpm was reached it was synchronised with the National Grid.

== Filmography ==
Pyestock was used for several scenes in the 2005 film Sahara by Breck Eisner, based on the best-selling book of the same name by Clive Cussler. Internal sections of Cell 3 and Cell 4 were suitably reworked for the film's supposedly solar powered waste disposal facility.

It was also used in the Red Dwarf episode “Epideme” specifically the small hatch into Cell 4.

The Establishment also features in the film A Yank Comes Back, which includes a short interview with Graham Harrison Friese-Greene, a son of William Friese-Greene.

== See also ==
- List of wind tunnels
