= Power Jets W.1 =

British turbojet engine

W.1
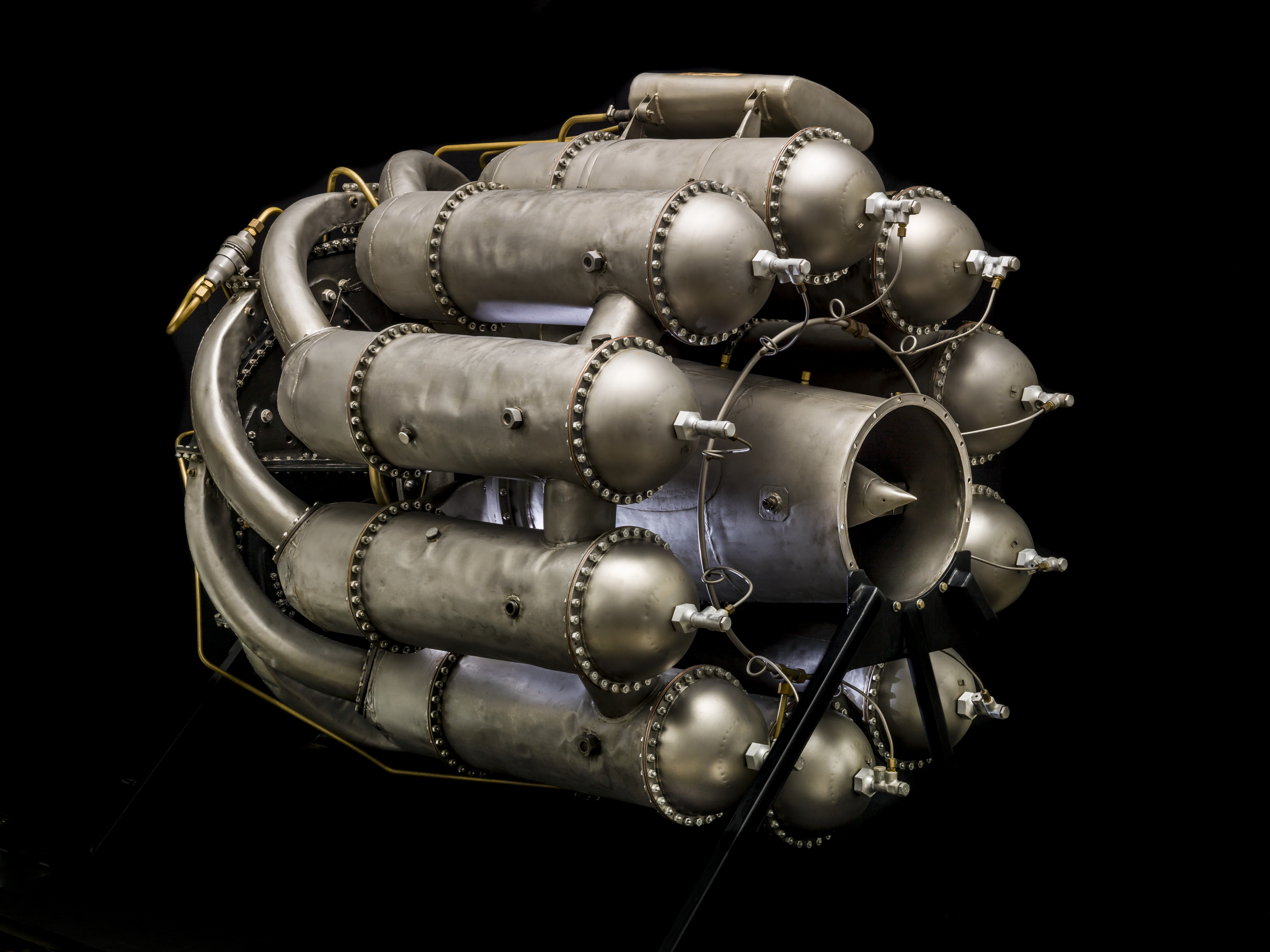
- The Whittle W.1X at the National Air and Space Museum
- Type: Turbojet
- Manufacturer: Power Jets
- First run: 14 December 1940
- Major applications: Gloster E.28/39
- Developed into: General Electric I-A

The Power Jets W.1 (sometimes called the Whittle W.1) was a British turbojet engine designed by Frank Whittle and Power Jets. The W.1 was built under contract by British Thomson-Houston (BTH) in the early 1940s. It is notable for being the first British jet engine to fly, as the "Whittle Supercharger Type W1", powering the Gloster E.28/39 on its maiden flight at RAF Cranwell on 15 May 1941. The W.1 was superseded by the Power Jets W.2.

== Design and development ==
After a period of indifference, in June 1939 a demonstration of the Power Jets WU was made before a delegation of the Air Ministry, notably Dr David Pye, Director of Scientific Research. The demonstration was so successful that the Ministry quickly arranged to buy the engine to give Power Jets working capital, lending it back to them for testing.

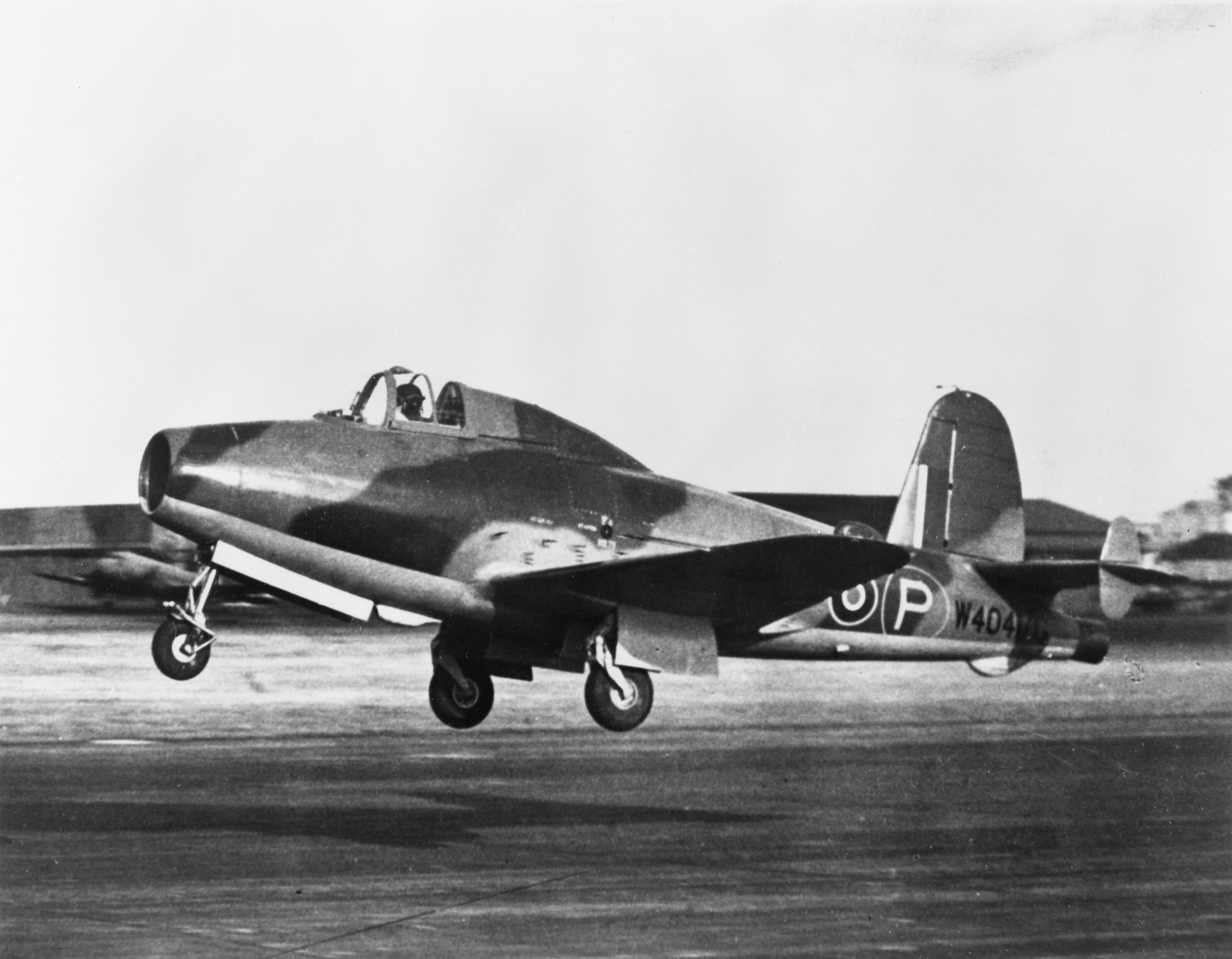
The first E.28/39 prototype W4041/G powered by the W.1A

At the same time, a contract was placed for a "flight engine", the W.1. Unlike the Whittle WU, that began bench testing in 1937, the W.1 was a symmetrical engine designed to facilitate, after development, installation in an aircraft. The W.1 used a double-sided centrifugal compressor of Hiduminium RR.59 alloy, reverse-flow 'Lubbock' combustion chambers and a water-cooled axial-flow turbine section using 72 blades with 'fir-tree' root fixings; the turbine was later modified to use air-cooling. The turbine blades were of Firth-Vickers Rex 78, a stainless steel developed under Dr. W. H. Hatfield. Design rating was 860 pounds-force (3.8 kN) at 16,500 rpm, increased to 17,750 rpm above 4,000 ft (1,200 m). With the W.1 aircraft manoeuvring would subsequently be limited (by compressor-casing stress) to 2g. Maximum jetpipe temperature was 597 °C.

As development of the new design dragged on, it was decided to build a test unit "early engine" using any components that were deemed unairworthy along with test items. This was assembled to become the one-off W.1X. This officially unairworthy unit powered the Gloster E.28/39 on a short 'hop' during taxiing trials in April 1941, with flight trials taking place a month later with a definitive W.1 engine. In February 1942, the E.28 was tested with the W.1A engine, reaching a speed of 430 miles per hour (690 km/h; 370 kn) at 15,000 feet (4,600 m). For comparison, the Spitfire Mk. V in service at the time had a maximum speed of 374 miles per hour (602 km/h; 325 kn) and the Mk. IX, not yet introduced, mounting an experimental engine reached 403 miles per hour (649 km/h; 350 kn) at high altitude. This purely experimental aircraft and the very first flyable engine outperformed one of the most advanced high-performance aircraft in the world.

After a visit to England in 1941, General Henry H. Arnold arranged for the W.1X to be flown to the U.S in October 1941, along with drawings for the more powerful W.2B engine, together with a team from Power Jets. The former became the prototype of first the General Electric I-A and then the General Electric I-16, and by April 1943 the latter had been developed to produce 1,650 pounds thrust (750 kgf).

In 1941, experiments with boosting the W.1's thrust by introducing a liquid coolant were initiated, the first fluid tried being liquid ammonia which proved too effective, resulting in the engine overspeeding and pushing the thrust and rpm indicators off the scales, before later trials changed to using water, and water-methanol. A system to trial the technique in the E.28/39 was devised but never fitted.

== Variants ==
Thrust given in foot-pounds (lbf) and kilonewtons (kN).

W.1(T)
Built from spares for bench-development only.
W.1(3)
Modified W.1.
W.1X
Early W.1 built from non-airworthy parts and intended for ground use only (aircraft taxi tests). Later sent to the US in October 1941, becoming the first jet engine to run in North America.
W.1A
Based on W.1, 1,450 lbf (6.45KN) air-cooled turbine disc and incorporating features intended for W.2. Used for second series of test flights of E.29/39 W4041/G beginning on 16 February 1942, and fitted with fuel barostat. Later featured modified oil 'ring main' system to prevent oil freezing at altitude.
WR.1
Experimental low-pressure design built by Rolls-Royce under contract to Power Jets.

== Applications ==
- Gloster E.28/39

== Engines on display ==
The Gloster E.28/39 and the Power Jets W.1 engine that powered it are on public display at the Science Museum, London.

The W.1A is kept at the RAF College Cranwell, and the W.1X at the Smithsonian Institution, Washington DC.

== Specifications (W.1 early development engine) ==
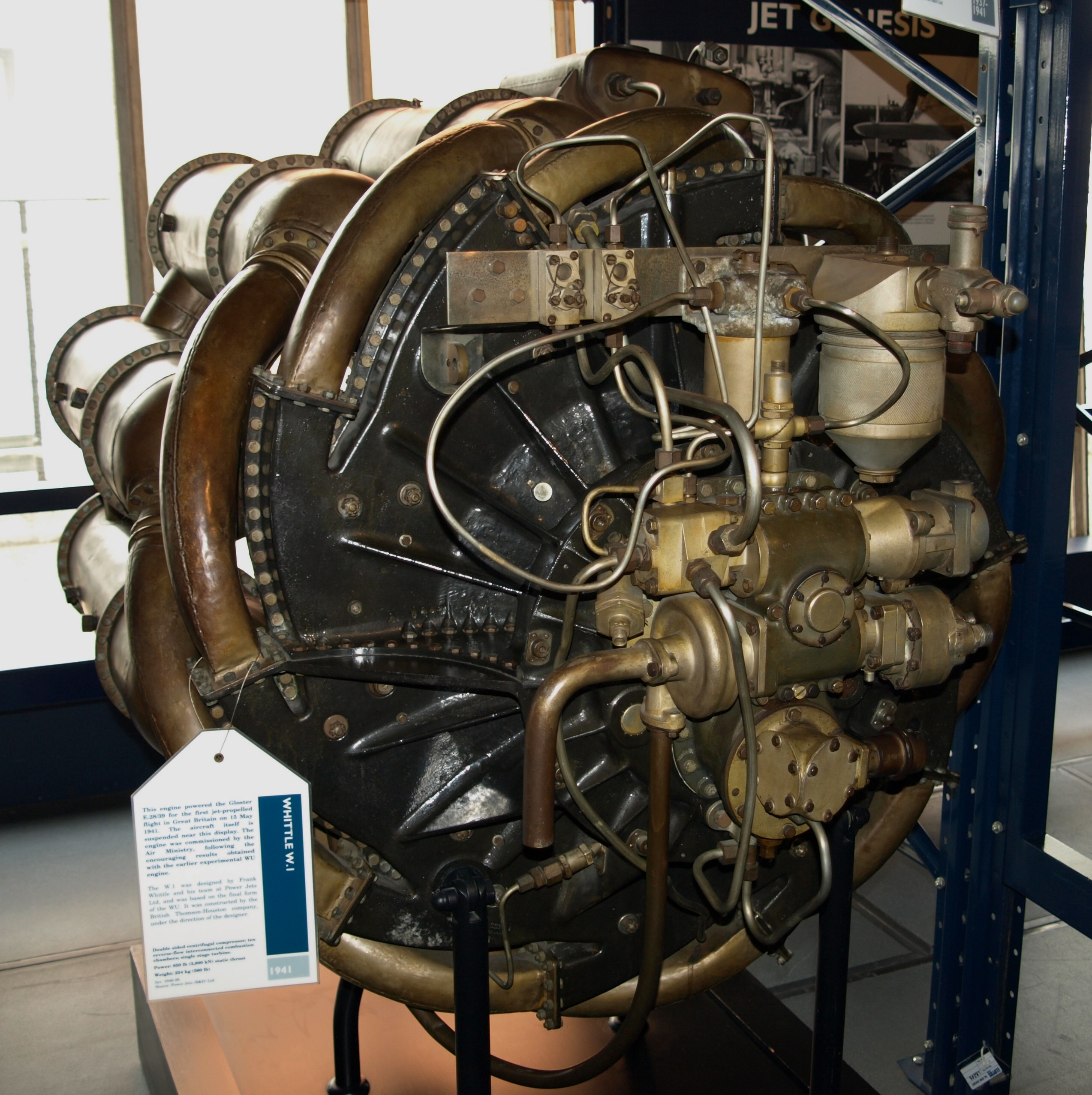
Power Jets W.1 on display at the Science Museum, London

Data from Jane's

==== General characteristics ====
- Type: centrifugal flow turbojet
- Length:
- Diameter:
- Dry weight: 700 lb (320 kg)

==== Components ====
- Compressor: single-stage double-sided centrifugal flow
- Combustors: 10 reverse-flow
- Turbine: single stage axial flow
- Fuel type: kerosene

==== Performance ====
- Maximum thrust: 850 lbf (3.8 kN) at 16,500 rpm
- Air mass flow: 20.6 lb/s (9.3 kg/s)
- Fuel consumption: 1,170 lb/h (531 kg/h)
- Specific fuel consumption: 1.376 lb/(lbf⋅h) (39.0 g/(kN⋅s))
- Thrust-to-weight ratio: 1.214

== Specifications (W.1 later development engine) ==
Data from Jane's

==== General characteristics ====
- Type: centrifugal flow turbojet
- Length:
- Diameter:
- Dry weight: 700 lb (320 kg)

==== Components ====
- Compressor: single-stage double-sided centrifugal flow
- Combustors: 10 reverse-flow can
- Turbine: single stage axial flow
- Fuel type: kerosene

==== Performance ====
- Maximum thrust: ~1,032 lbf (4.59 kN)
- Overall pressure ratio: ~3.8:1
- Air mass flow: ~25.4 lb/s (9.3 kg/s)
- Turbine inlet temperature: ~1,430 °F (780 °C)
- Fuel consumption: ~1401 lb/h (~636 kg/h)
- Specific fuel consumption: ~1.358 lb/(lbf⋅h) (38.5 g/(kN⋅s))
- Thrust-to-weight ratio: ~1.474

== Gallery ==
The engine from different angles

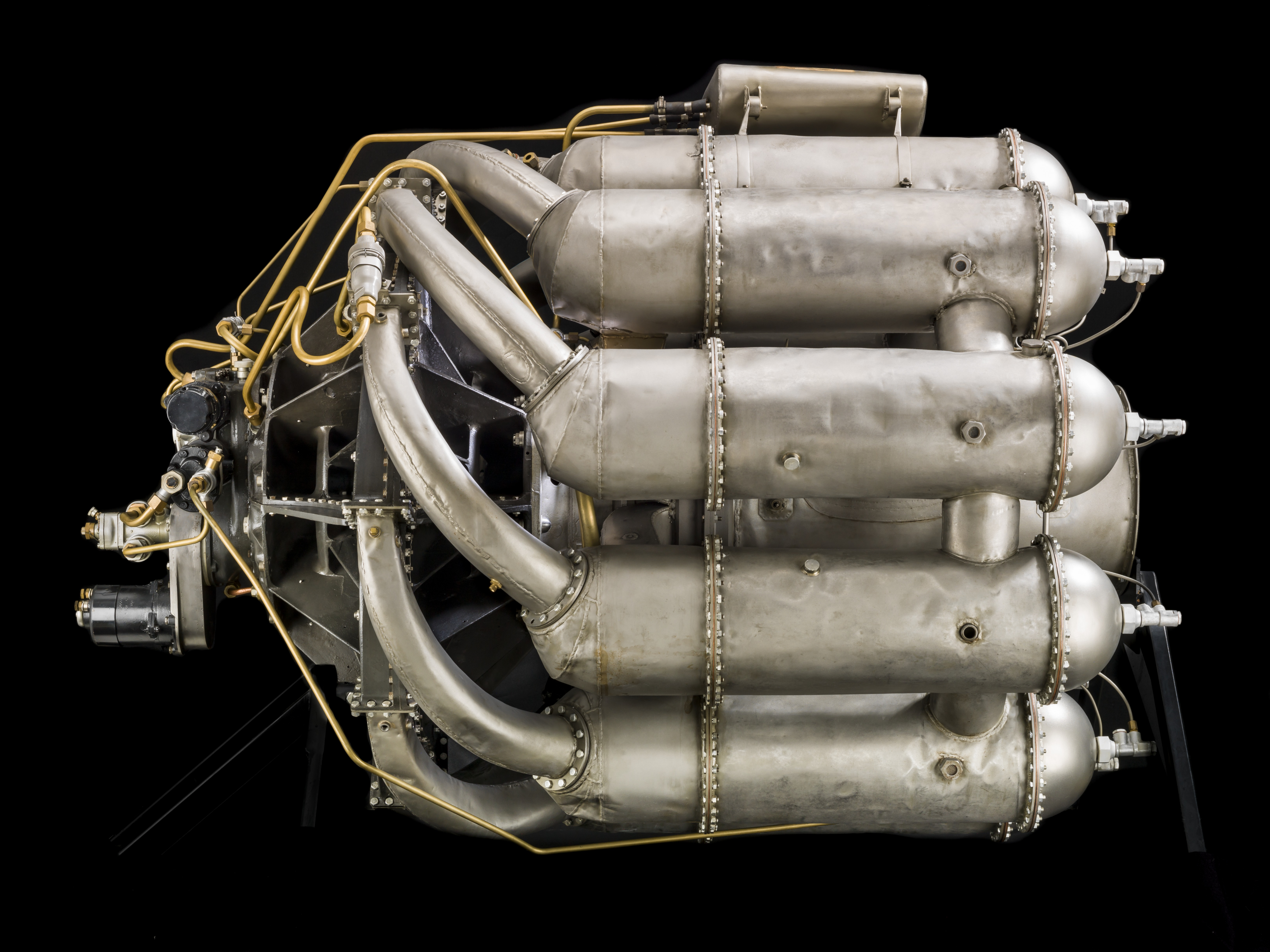

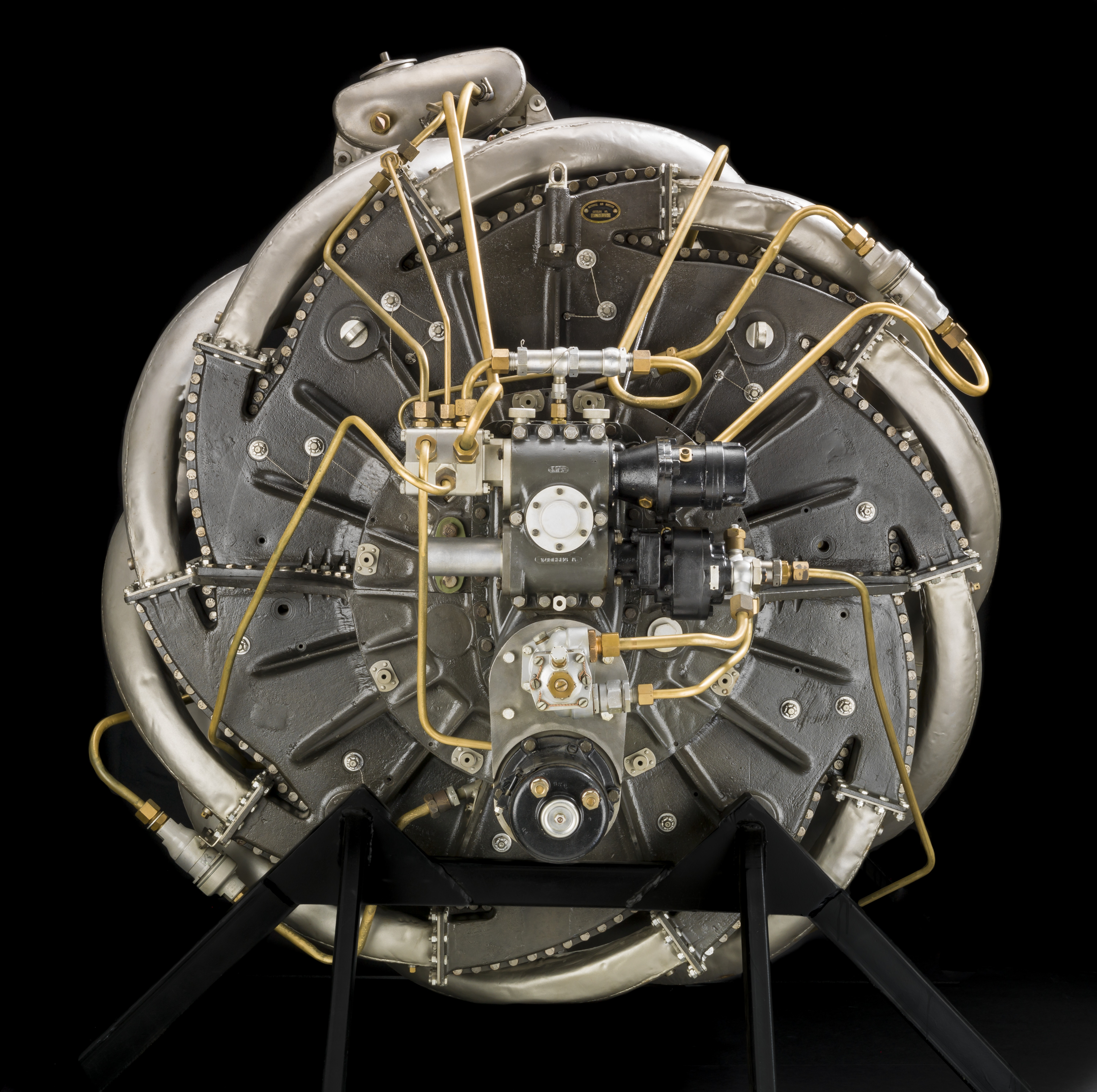

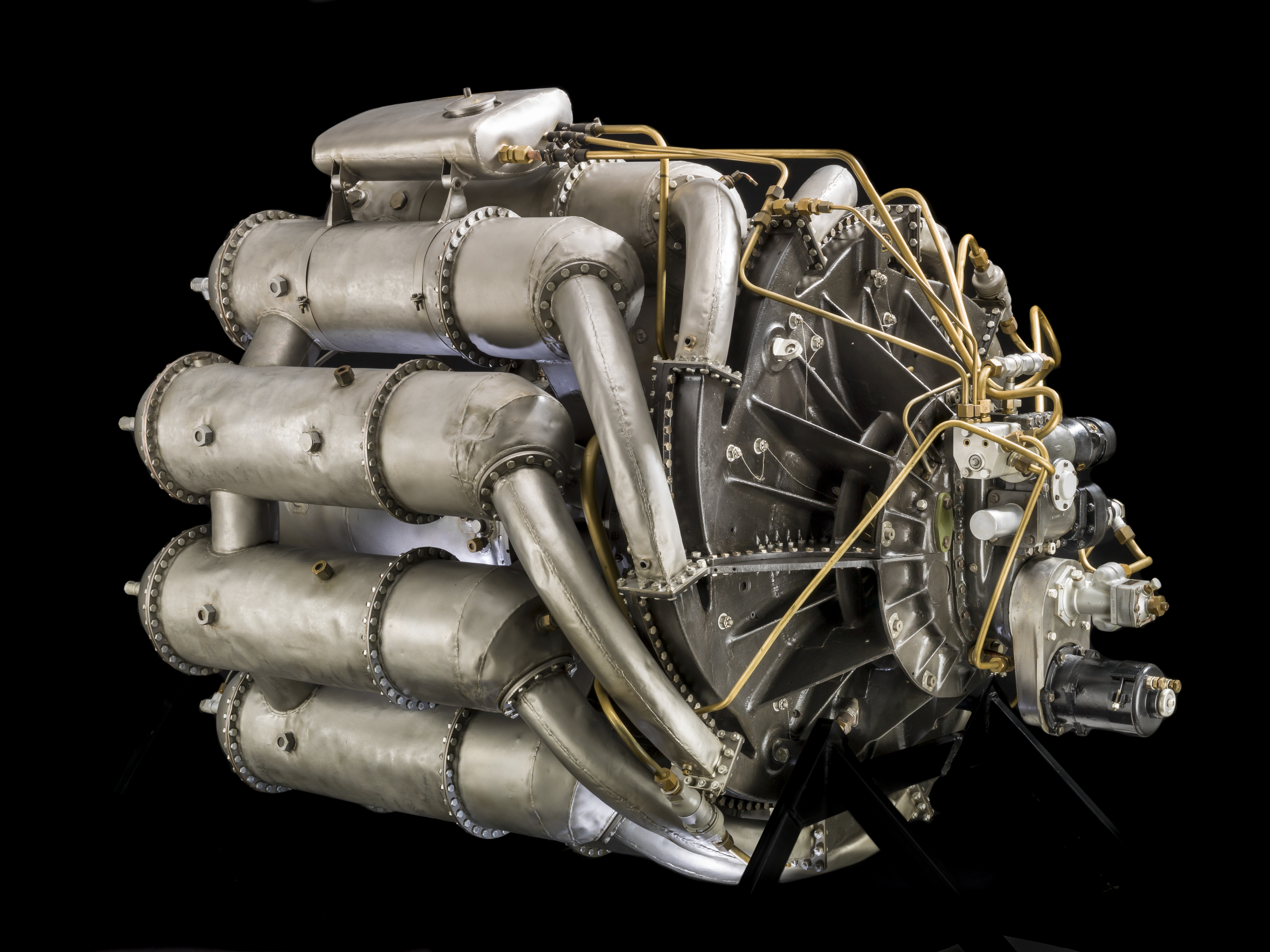

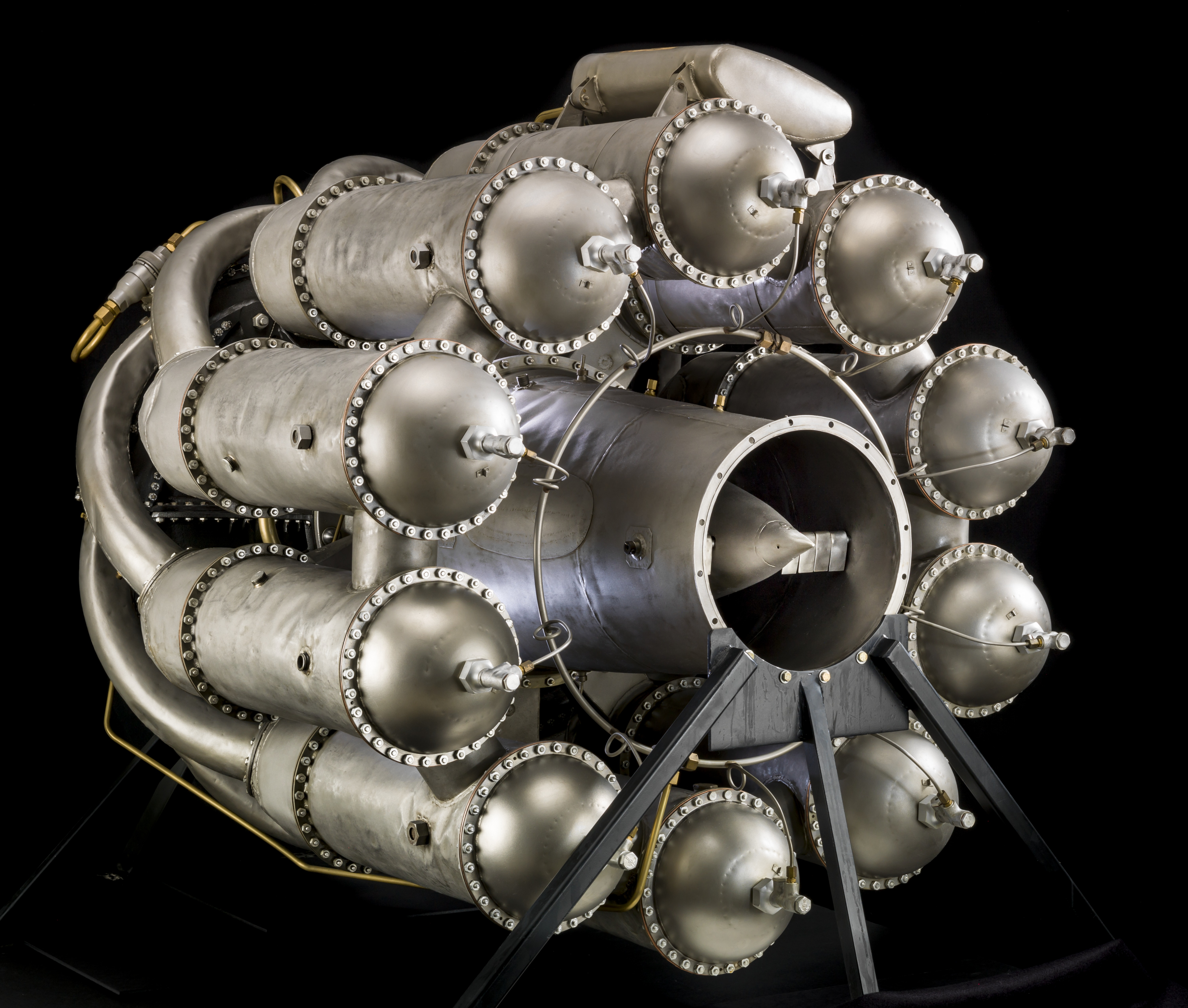

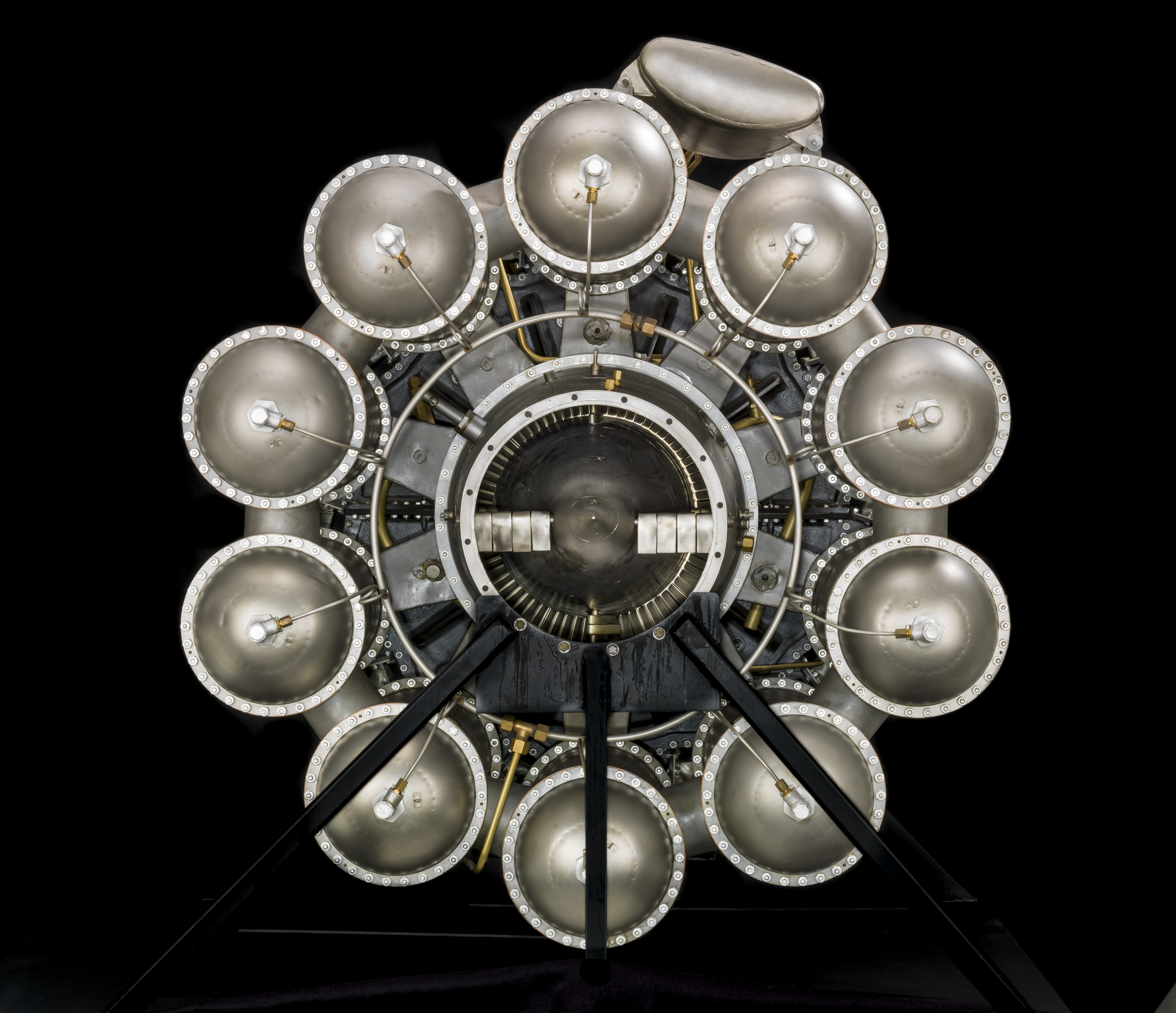

== See also ==
Related development

- General Electric I-A
- General Electric J31
- Rolls-Royce Welland
- Power Jets W.2

Comparable engines

- Heinkel HeS 3

Related lists

- List of aircraft engines
