= Power Jets W.2 =

British turbojet engine

W.2
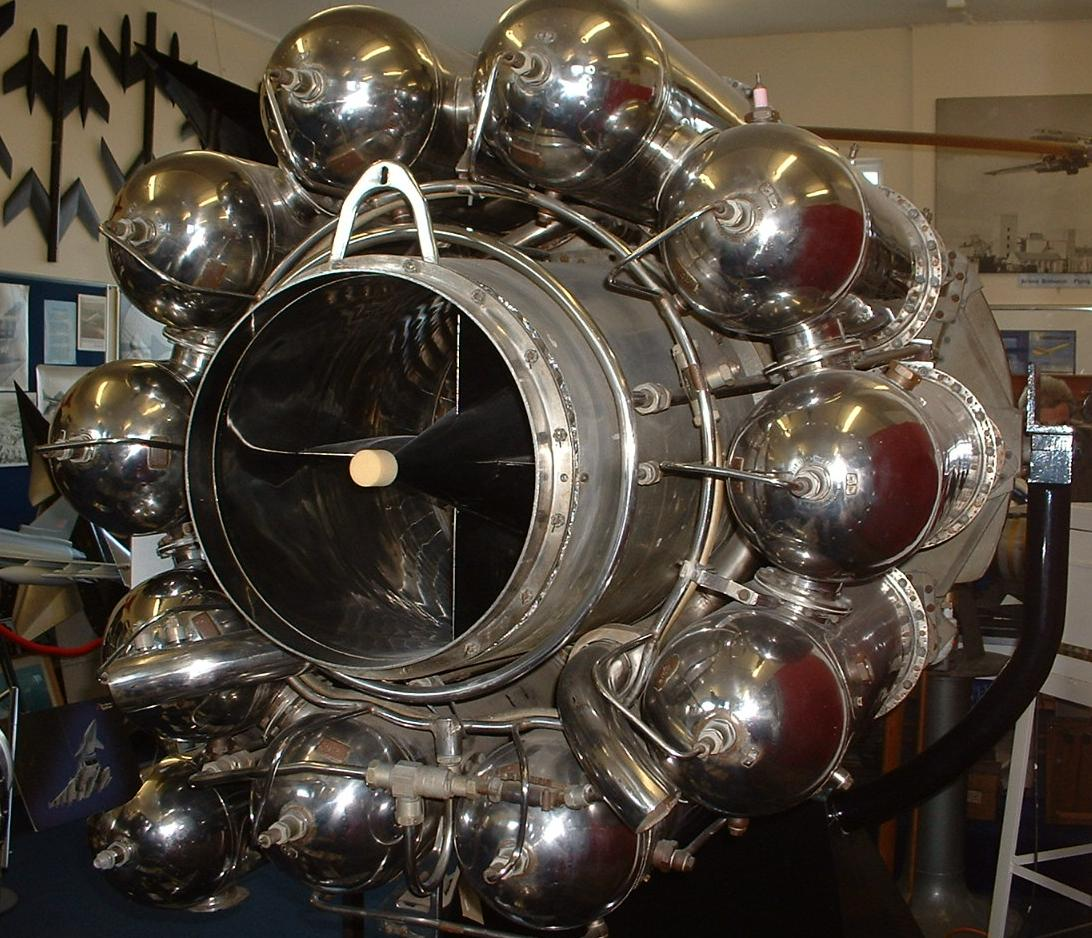
- Power Jets W.2/700 on display at the Farnborough Air Sciences Trust (rear view).
- Type: Turbojet
- Manufacturer: Rover Car Company
- First run: c. 1941
- Major applications: Gloster E.28/39; Gloster F.9/40
- Developed from: Power Jets W.1
- Developed into: General Electric I-A; Rolls-Royce Welland (W.2B-Rover B.23); Rolls-Royce Derwent (W.2B/500-Rover B.26)

The Power Jets W.2 was a British turbojet engine designed by Frank Whittle and Power Jets (Research and Development) Ltd. Like the earlier Power Jets W.1, the reverse-flow combustion configuration included a double-sided centrifugal compressor, 10 combustion chambers and an axial-flow turbine with air-cooled disc. It entered production as the Rolls-Royce Welland and was the first UK jet engine to power operational aircraft, the Gloster Meteor.

== Design and development ==
In 1940 the Air Ministry placed a contract with the Gloster Aircraft Company for prototypes of a new twin-engined jet fighter aircraft to the requirement of F.9/40, this aircraft became the Gloster Meteor. At the same time, Power Jets was authorised to design a new engine that was intended to power the same aircraft. The W.2 was built under contract by the Rover Car Company in the early 1940s. Relations between Power Jets and Rover were somewhat strained and development of the W.2 was very slow.

In late 1942, Rover agreed to exchange their jet engine factory at Barnoldswick, Lancashire for the Rolls-Royce Meteor tank engine factory in Nottingham, with no money changing hands. At the behest of the UK government, Rolls-Royce thereupon assumed control of the W.2 project, with Frank Whittle and his small team at Power Jets acting in an advisory capacity. Together, they ironed out the problems with the W.2 and finally put the engine into mass production as the 1,600 pounds-force (7.1 kN) thrust Rolls-Royce Welland. These engines were installed in the Gloster Meteor F Mk1 and early F Mk3's and entered service in 1944.

After initial suggestions in 1939 by the Engine Department of the Royal Aircraft Establishment (RAE), the latter's Pyestock Section experimented with the technique of injecting fuel into the engine's exhaust nozzle, later known as reheat, and this technique was further refined after Power Jets and the personnel from Pyestock had been amalgamated. Reheat was later flight trialled in the W.2/700 engines in a Meteor I. The technique increased the Meteor's speed by 30-40 mph.

== Variants ==
The Rover designations for engines produced at Barnoldswick were given a "B" prefix together with their own internal design number, e.g., "B.23". Later, after designs were transferred to Rolls-Royce (RR) an additional "R" was prefixed, changing the designation to "RB" to prevent possible confusion with US bomber designations, e.g., "RB.23". This "RB" designation system continues to be used within Rolls-Royce to this day.

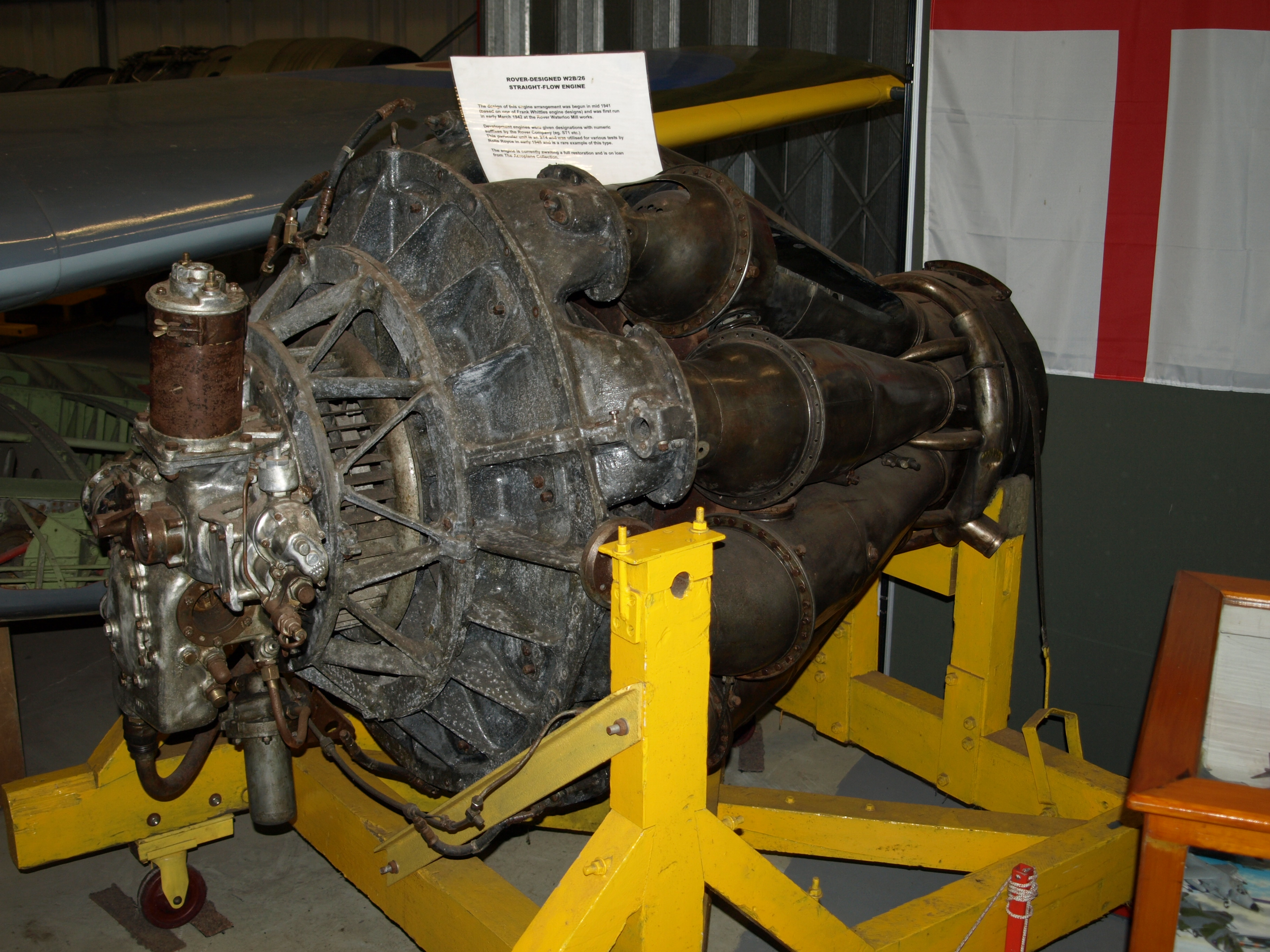
A Rover W.2B/26 on display at the Midland Air Museum This design was later to become the Derwent

W.2
Design thrust of 1,600 pounds-force (7.1 kN) and a dry weight of approximately 850 pounds (390 kg). Early versions could not exceed 1,000lbf thrust without compressor surge and excessive exhaust gas temperature. Engines produced by Rover under subcontract to MAP. W.2 design quickly abandoned and replaced by W.2B after Whittle re-evaluated W.2 design and calculated exhaust gas velocity would approach Mach 1.
W.2 Mark IV
W.2 manufactured by British Thomson-Houston (BTH) but discovered to be sensitive to design assumptions, so changed in stages by Power Jets to bring in line with W.2B design. Wrecked by bursting of faulty new impeller forging on 10 October 1941 after completing "a useful amount of testing".
W.2Y
Direct flow "straight-through" combustion chamber design, May 1940, not built.
W.2B/Rover B.23
Initial first two engines produced by Rover as the 'B.23' with one installed in E.28/39 W4046/G, other units built by BTH, and Power Jets. Initially engines suffered failure of Rex 78 turbine blades, General Electric (GE) in the US sending Rover several improved sets of Hastelloy B blades in July 1942. Blade material later switched to Nimonic 80. Engine design later transferred to Rolls-Royce as prototype of the B.23 Welland, and also built in US as GE I-A. Re-designed 'B.23' combustion chambers for this engine designed by Joseph Lucas Ltd.
W.2B Mark II
MAP-authorised Rover re-design using 10-vane diffuser designed by Rover/RR, and new turbine with fewer, broader blades. By Dec 1941 giving 1,510 pounds-force (6.7 kN) without surging.

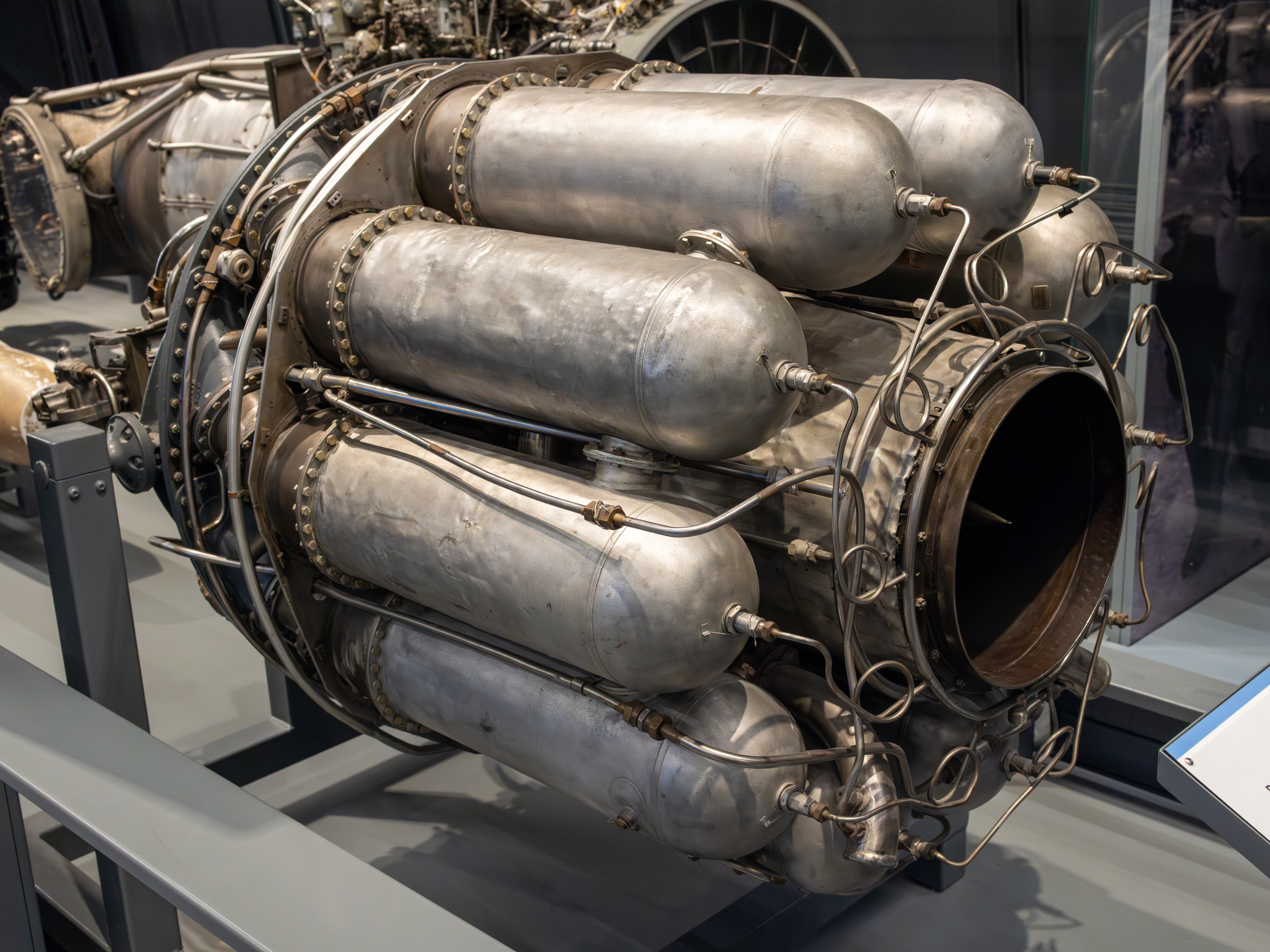
Power Jets W.2B/500 displayed at the Royal Air Force Museum London

W.2B/500 - Rover B.26
W.2B with longer turbine blades and using diffuser of W.2B Mark II and new blower case and turbine design to give 1,850 pounds-force (8.2 kN) at 16,750 rpm. First run in September 1942 attaining 1,755 pounds-force (7.81 kN). Sfc, 1.13 lb/(hr lbf) with jet pipe temperature of 606°C. Initially suffered from resonance at 14,000 rpm leading to impeller blade cracking. MAP-authorised re-design with straight-through combustion chambers by Adrian Lombard and John Herriot (the latter of the AID) at Rover as the B.26 with four test engines being built before design taken over by RR and after re-design for greater air flow becoming the B.37 Derwent. 'B.26' combustion chambers designed by Joseph Lucas Ltd.
W.2/700
New 'Type 16' compressor diffuser, new compressor casing, plus improved compressor rotor sent over from GE, all combined to produce 80% compressor efficiency, Nimonic 80 turbine blades, and a static thrust of 2,000 pounds-force (8.9 kN) at 16,700 rpm. By 1944 producing 2,485 pounds-force (11.05 kN) at a pressure ratio of 4:1 with airflow of 47.15 lb/s from same size engine as W.1. Sfc, 1.05 lb/(hr lbf) with jet pipe temperature of 647°C. Flight-tested reheat in Meteor I EE215/G increasing top speed from 420 mph to 460 mph. Flight-tested to 505 mph at 30,000 feet in E.28/39 W4046/G. Also ground-tested with aft ducted fan.
W.2/800
W.2/700 with longer turbine blades for greater thrust. Suffered from turbine blade failure.
W.2/850
A developed version of greater thrust of 2,485 pounds-force (11.05 kN) at 16,500 rpm and a higher dry weight of 950 pounds (430 kg).
Rolls-Royce B.23 Welland
Mass produced version of the W.2B/Rover B.23 for Meteor I. Developed 1,600 pounds-force (7.1 kN) static thrust. Sfc, 1.12 lb/(hr lbf). 100 produced. Uprated to 1,700 pounds-force (7.6 kN) thrust with nozzle inserts for chasing V-1's. Type-tested to 500 hours, into service for Meteor I at 150 hours time between overhaul (TBO).
Rolls-Royce B.37 Derwent I
Combined design based on W.2B/500 and Rover B.26 for Meteor III. Straight-through development of the 'trombone' style W.2 configuration, using already tooled-up compressor casing for Welland, new RR diffuser, and with compressor and turbine air and gas flow increased by 25% to give 2,000 pounds-force (8.9 kN) static thrust. First tested July 1943. Type-tested to 500 hours, into service for Meteor III at 150 hours TBO.

== Applications ==
The following aircraft were used for test purposes only:

- Gloster E.28/39
- F.9/40
- Vickers Wellington

The W.2B/700 was to be used in the Miles M.52 supersonic research aircraft. In order to achieve the thrust required for supersonic flight, a version of the engine was developed using a turbine-driven "augmenter" ducted fan (an early form of turbofan). The NO.4 augmenter was mounted behind the engine, drawing fresh air through ducts surrounding the engine. Power was boosted even further by supplying the air to the world's first "reheat jetpipe" or afterburner which was actually a very early athodyd or ramjet. The hope was that this combination of the W.2/700, turbofan augmenter and re-heat/ramjet would produce the required power for the proposed 1,000 mph aircraft.

== Engines on display ==
- A preserved W.2/700 is on public display at the Farnborough Air Sciences Trust.
- Another W.2/700 is part of the aero engine collection at Royal Air Force Museum Cosford.
- A W.2/700 is on display at Cranfield University. Awarded Engineering Heritage Award no.102.
- A sectioned W.2/700 at Lutterworth Museum
- W.2/500 at RAF museum London
- A Rover W.2B/26 is on display at the Midland Air Museum.

== Specifications (W.2/850) ==
Data from Jane's

==== General characteristics ====
- Type: Centrifugal flow turbojet
- Length:
- Diameter:
- Dry weight: 950 lb (431 kg)

==== Components ====
- Compressor: Single-stage double-sided centrifugal flow
- Combustors: 10 reverse-flow
- Turbine: Single stage axial flow
- Fuel type: Kerosene

==== Performance ====
- Maximum thrust: 2,485 lbf (1,127 kgf) at 16,500 rpm
- Overall pressure ratio: 4:1
- Air mass flow: 47 lb/s (21 kg/s)
- Fuel consumption: 2,610 lb/hr (1,185 kg/hr)
- Thrust-to-weight ratio: 2.6

== See also ==
Related development

- Power Jets W.1
- General Electric I-A
- Rolls-Royce Welland

Related lists

- List of aircraft engines
