= Michael Whittaker =

Michael Whittaker may refer to:

- Michael Whittaker (costume designer) (1918–1995), British costume designer and actor
- Michael Whittaker (rowing) (born 1970), New Zealand coxswain
- Michael Whittaker (gymnast) in 1984 Trampoline World Championships
- Michael Whittaker (aircraft designer) creator of the Whittaker MW5 Sorcerer and Whittaker MW6

== See also ==
- Michael Whitaker (disambiguation)
