= St Patrick's Church, Nuthall =

St. Patrick's Church, Nuthall
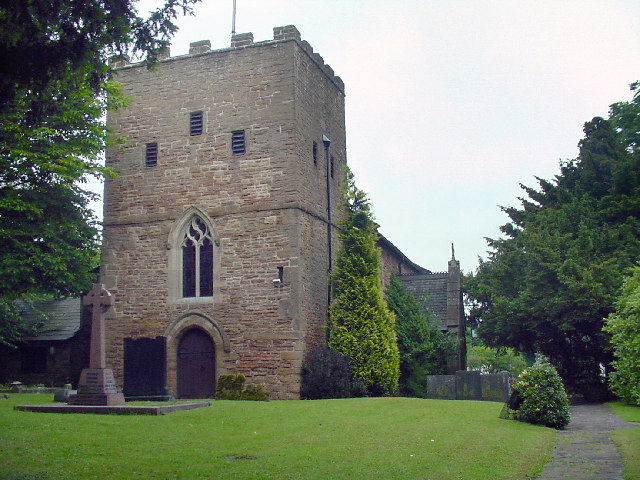
- St Patrick's Church, Nuthall
- St. Patrick's Church, Nuthall
- 52°59′43.29″N 1°14′2.96″W
- OS grid reference: SK 51475 44473
- Location: Nuthall
- Country: England
- Denomination: Church of England

Administration
- Diocese: Diocese of Southwell and Nottingham
- Archdeaconry: Nottingham
- Deanery: Nottingham North

St Patrick's Church, Nuthall is a Grade II* listed parish church in the Church of England in Nuthall.

== History ==
The church was first built in the 13th century but was heavily restored in 1838. It was re-roofed in 1858 and again in 1884, when James Fowler carried out other restoration work including the addition of a vestry and organ chamber.

== Organ ==
The organ is by Lewis. It was installed in 1871 but may have been a pre-existing house organ. A specification of the organ can be found on the National Pipe Organ Register.

== See also ==
- Grade II* listed buildings in Nottinghamshire
- Listed buildings in Nuthall
