= Hucknall Aerodrome =

Closed aerodrome near Nottingham, England

Hucknall Aerodrome RFC No. 15 Training Depot Hucknall RAF Hucknall Rolls-Royce Flight Test Establishment
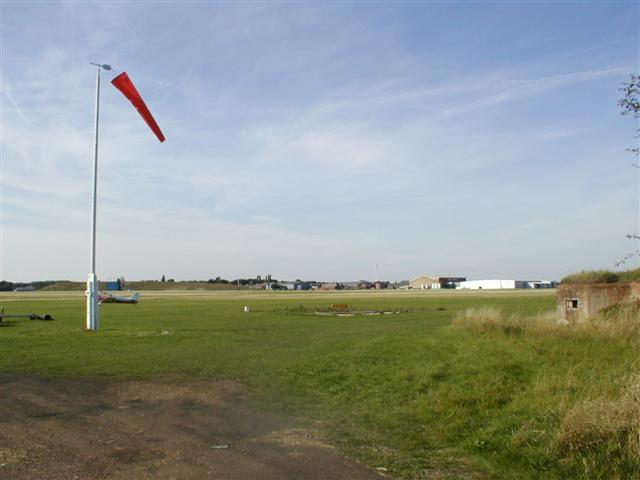
- IATA: none; ICAO: ~~EGNA~~

Summary
- Airport type: Private
- Owner: Rolls-Royce Group PLC
- Operator: Merlin Flying Club Limited
- Location: Hucknall, Nottinghamshire
- Closed: 1 March 2015
- Elevation AMSL: 281 ft (86 m)
- Coordinates: 53°00′52″N 001°13′06″W
- Website: Flying at Hucknall

Map
- Location in Nottinghamshire

Runways
Direction	Length		Surface
Direction	m	ft	Surface
~~04/22~~	730	2,395	Grass
~~11/29~~	776	2,546	Grass
~~08/26~~	2,000	5,906	Tarmac
- Sources: UK AIP at NATS

Hucknall Aerodrome (ICAO: ~~EGNA~~) was a former general aviation and RAF aerodrome located 5 miles (8.0 kilometres) north north-west of Nottingham, Nottinghamshire, England, and west of Hucknall town. The aerodrome had been operated by the Merlin Flying Club since 1971 and then by Rolls-Royce Group plc. Before its closure, it was owned and operated by ITP Aero.

Hucknall Aerodrome had a CAA Ordinary Licence (Number P507) that allowed daytime flights for the public transport of passengers or for flying instruction as authorised by the licensee and was not available for public transport passenger flights required to use a licensed aerodrome. It was a C.1916 grass aerodrome of significant historical importance. On 1 March 2015 the aerodrome closed indefinitely to be turned into a housing and industrial estate.

== History ==
=== The Great War ===
Hucknall Aerodrome dates to 1916 when it opened under No. 12 (Training) Group, 27th Wing, housing No. 15 Training Depot of the Royal Flying Corps (RFC) operating the Curtiss JN-4 Jenny. During February 1918, No. 218 (Gold Coast) Squadron (see No. 218 Squadron RAF) arrived operating the de Havilland DH.9. On 1 March 1918, No. 130 Squadron (see No. 130 Squadron RAF) arrived also operating the DH.9.

On 18 March 1918, No. 205 Squadron arrived operating de Havilland DH.4 and DH.9s. During April, No. 135 Squadron RAF was formed but were allocated no aircraft and disbanded on 4 July 1918 along with No. 130 Squadron. On arrival, all of these squadrons were absorbed into No. 15 Training Depot and following creation of the Royal Air Force (RAF) on 1 April 1918, No. 15 Training Depot RFC was absorbed into this new organisation.

On 18 August 1918 a detachment of the United States Army Air Service arrived, the 23d Aero Squadron (Repair), who were engaged with the depot in aircraft and engine repair activities. On 5 November 1918 the 23d Aero Squadron (Repair) left.

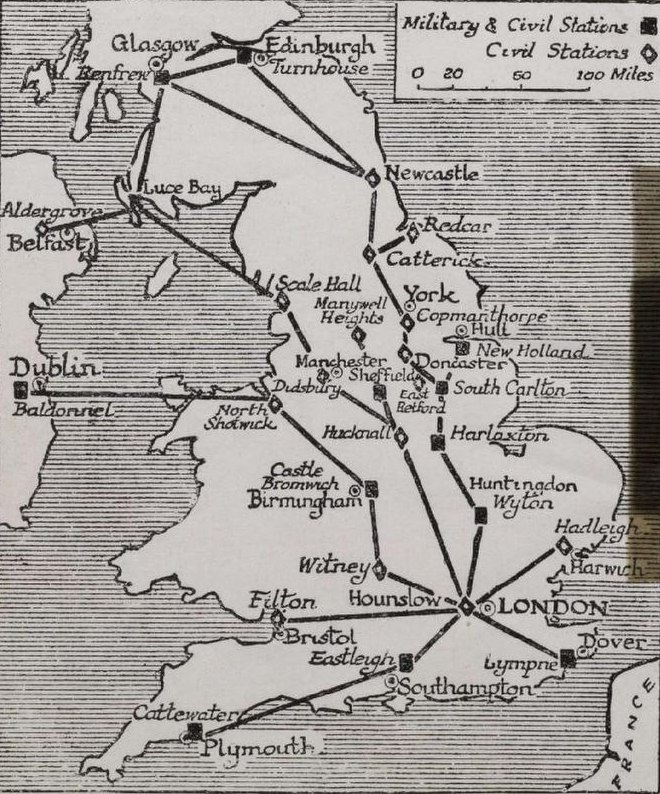
"Map of Air Routes and Landing Places in Great Britain, as temporarily arranged by the Air Ministry for civilian flying", published in 1919, showing Hucknall as a stop on the route from Hounslow, near London, to Manchester, Glasgow and Belfast

By the end of June 1919, No. 205 and 218 Squadrons were disbanded, which left the aerodrome with no aircraft or squadrons. In 1919, the Air Ministry closed Hucknall and sold it to a local farmer, George Elkington.

=== Nottingham Aero Club ===
In 1926, following contact with George Elkington, it was agreed to allow the new Nottingham Aero Club to operate from the former RFC General Service Sheds/Belfast Truss Hangars (see lattice truss bridge) situated to the north of the aerodrome. The club committee consisted of President Sir Harold Bowden, Vice-president Sir Albert Ball; the father of the famous Great War pilot Captain Albert Ball; Mr D. Rushworth, the chairman; Mr C. R. Sands, the Hon. Treasurer; and Mr R. Macpherson, the Hon. Secretary. The club's pilot was Mr Bernard Martin. The club used the de Havilland DH.60 Moth.

On 30 July 1927 they competed in the King's Cup Race which finished at Hucknall. Sixteen starters set out with the winner W. L. Hope (race number 5) flying DH.60 Moth G-EBME over the course of 540 mi (870 km) at an average speed of 92.8 mph (149.3 km/h). Other competing aircraft that completed the race at Hucknall included a Cierva Autogiro Company C8L Mark 2 Autogyro G-EBYY and an Avro 566 Avenger II G-EBND, this was a prototype fighter aircraft which never enter production.

During the late 1920s it was decided that the RAF needed to be modernised and expanded to meet expected future demands. Subsequently, Hucknall was identified for expansion into an RAF station and was bought by the Air Ministry in the latter part of 1927. This period is commonly known as the '1930s expansion period' and many aerodromes were reopened or upgraded during this time. The Nottingham Aero Club vacated the aerodrome during 1928 before the formation of No. 504 (County of Nottingham) Squadron and the official RAF opening. A large proportion of the buildings from 1916 and the expansion period are still extant, including the C.1916 General Service Sheds, which are listed buildings under English Heritage monument number 1398209.

=== Royal Air Force renaissance ===
The aerodrome reopened as RAF Hucknall in 1928 and contained the new No. 504 (County of Nottingham) Squadron. The first commanding officer was Squadron Leader Charles M. Elliot-Smith, AFC. This squadron was formed on 26 March 1928 as a light bomber Special Reserve Unit and operated the Hawker Horsley. For training purposes they also operated the Avro 504K, Avro 504N and the Avro 621. In 1935 the Hawker Horsley was replaced by the Westland Wallace, another light bomber. On 18 May 1936 the new Squadron Leader Hugh Seely, Bart, MP (later Hugh Seely, 1st Baron Sherwood) read out a signal that along with the other Special Reserve Units, No. 504 Squadron were to be embodied into the Auxiliary Air Force. In May 1937 the Wallaces were exchanged for the Hawker Hind light bomber.

On 21 August 1936, No. 98 Squadron RAF and No. 104 Squadron RAF arrived, also with the Hawker Hind, training exercises involving the three light bomber squadrons took place, this included bombing exercises at Otmoor ranges. On 2 May 1938, No. 104 Squadron left Hucknall for RAF Bassingbourn with No. 98 Squadron remaining at Hucknall and converting to the Fairey Battle light bomber. On 31 October 1938 No. 504 Squadron ended their association with light bombers and became a fighter squadron, the Gloster Gauntlet replacing the Hawker Hind. As a result of this change there was no longer a need for air gunners but Seely negotiated for some to train as Non-Commissioned Officer Pilots for the Gauntlet. A further change for the squadron was a new squadron badge, which incorporated the Major Oak Tree, indicative of nearby Sherwood Forest, the badge featured the squadron's motto 'Vindicat in Venti' (Latin: it avenges in the wind).

Throughout the 1930s, Hucknall hosted an annual Empire Air Day with the resident squadrons giving aerobatic and air attack demonstrations. The last of these was on 20 May 1939, when No. 504 Squadron had just replaced the Gauntlet with the new monoplane fighter, the Hawker Hurricane I. During the middle part of 1939 and as part of the work up of the squadron for war, Seely initially took a post at the RAF Duxford Operations Room with Squadron Leader Victor Beamish AFC assuming command and the Rt. Hon. Lord Mottistone (see J. E. B. Seely, 1st Baron Mottistone) agreeing to be the first Honorary Air Commodore. On 27 August 1939 Beamish was signalled to move the squadron to RAF Digby for intensive war training. On 26 April 1939 the Mayor of Derby visited No. 98 Squadron, they had been affiliated to Derby as part of the Air Ministry Municipal Liaison Scheme. After No. 504 Squadron had departed No. 98 Squadron remained as the sole unit at Hucknall and in turn on 2 March 1940 were signalled to leave for Nantes, France.

=== Second World War ===
In July 1939 the aerodrome was subject to the Army Home Defence Scheme, all aircraft would be camouflaged and airfield defences upgraded. At Hucknall three dispersals were created on the south, west and north west perimeters of the airfield. The south dispersal featured a concrete pentagonal pillbox with an adjoining mounting for an anti-aircraft gun, (see British hardened field defences of World War II) along with a Stanton air-raid shelter and a flight office of wooden frame and corrugated steel construction; the west dispersal featured slit trenches and a wooden flight hut and the north-west dispersal featured two Stanton air-raid shelters along with a wooden flight hut.

A further Stanton shelter was positioned to the north-east of the flying ground perimeter and a further Type 24 machine gun post of brick construction south-east of the flying ground perimeter. To the north of the station over Watnall Road and within the billet area a fortified battle headquarters was positioned; it is from here the station would have been commanded in the event of an attack by enemy forces.

The primary defence of the aerodrome at this time was the responsibility of the Sherwood Foresters Regiment but in late 1940 this was handed over the Royal Air Force Regiment. In tandem with the upgrade of the airfield defences a bunker at nearby RAF Watnall was constructed to house No. 12 Group RAF (Fighter Command) for the command and control of fighters in their sector; they moved into the bunker in late 1940. No. 12 Group had been based at Hucknall along with No. 1 Group RAF (Bomber Command) since 1939. All the defensive works are extant, with the flight office and huts missing.

In 1940, No. 1 (RAF) Ferry Pilots Pool under the command of Flight Lieutenant G. W. H. Wild, which ferried repaired aircraft and the No. 12 Group Communications Flight were the only RAF flying units at the aerodrome. On 10 September 1940 Squadron Leader Douglas Bader flew to Hucknall and met with Air Vice Marshal Trafford Leigh-Mallory, commander of No. 12 Group with regard to the Squadron Leader's Big Wing proposal.

On 21 December 1940, the station was visited by a Dutch pilot who claimed to be Captain van Lott who had force landed in a Wellington bomber and was part of a special squadron and needed to borrow an aircraft to return to his base at RAF Dyce near Aberdeen. The pilot was in fact Franz von Werra who had escaped from the prisoner of war camp at Swanwick, Derbyshire and was arrested. A film of Werra's exploits was made in 1957, The One That Got Away. During early 1941, No. 1 Group Bomber Command left Hucknall for RAF Bawtry.

In January 1941, No. 1 (Polish) Flying Training School was formed at Hucknall, this unit was involved in the ab-initio and advanced training of Polish airmen. The school used the Tiger Moth for elementary training, the Fairey Battle for advanced training and the Airspeed Oxford for advanced multi engine training. The unit was renamed No. 16 Service Flying Training School RAF during June 1941 and moved to RAF Newton in July 1941. On 16 July 1941, another training unit arrived at Hucknall, No. 25 Elementary Flying Training School RAF operating the Tiger Moth. They would stay at Hucknall in the training role along with No. 12 Group Communications Flight and the ATA Ferry Pool until the end of the war.

=== Postwar use ===
In May 1946, No. 504 Squadron reformed at RAF Syerston and returned to Hucknall operating the de Havilland Mosquito NF.30 night-fighter. The new commanding officer was Squadron Leader A. H. Rook DFC AFC. In May 1948, the Mosquitos were replaced by Supermarine Spitfire F.22 day-fighters, with Squadron Leader J. M. Birkin DFC AFC taking over command and Sir Hugh Seely becoming the Honorary Vice Commodore. In March 1950 the squadron completed the move to RAF Wymeswold. In 1946, the Nottingham University Air Squadron arrived operating the Tiger Moth and left for RAF Newton in 1947.

In 1946, No. 12 Group's underground bunker at nearby RAF Watnall was vacated and upgraded as part of the ROTOR radar network to track any threats from the Soviet Air Forces, it remained in this capacity until 1961 when it was closed but left in a state of readiness. Some personnel were accommodated at Hucknall with the airfield supporting visits by ROTOR associated communications flight aircraft. In February 2014, the bunker was profiled on Channel 4's The Restoration Man when it was undergoing conversion into a 1940s-themed guest house, incorporating many of the original design features.

In 1949, a detachment of No. 664 Squadron RAF (1970 Reserve AOP Flight) arrived operating the Taylorcraft Auster V artillery observation aircraft. In 1951, the AOP 5s were exchanged for the Auster AOP.6. The Austers were operated from the airfield until the disbandment of all auxiliary squadrons in 1957. No. 54 Maintenance Unit RAF which had arrived at Hucknall during 1956 also vacated. The permanent RAF presence at the aerodrome ended in 1957.

=== Rolls-Royce Flight Test Establishment ===
During the early 1930s, it had been recognised that Rolls-Royce (RR) would need an area of open land for the test and validation of new engine designs and modifications. Mr Cyril Lovesey, a private pilot at Nottingham Airport (later RAF Tollerton) had seen the potential at RAF Hucknall. A request to the Air Ministry was made to share the land with the RAF and also for the use of two General Service Sheds for engine development and test flying purposes. Permission was granted and the RR Flight Test Establishment started operating in December 1934. The Chief Test Pilot was Captain Ronald Thomas Shepherd (Ronnie Shephard), who had been a member of the RFC.

The test establishment received the first flying test bed aircraft during the early part of 1935, a Gloster Gnatsnapper, a Hawker Fury and a Hawker Hart. Testing of the Rolls-Royce Kestrel took place to develop performance and increase reliability. In 1936 Rolls-Royce purchased a German Heinkel He70 airliner registration G-ADZF delivered to Hucknall fitted with a Rolls-Royce Kestrel engine. Then the fastest aircraft available "öff the shelf". In 1938 Rolls-Royce fitted a Rolls-Royce Peregrine engine which raised the aircraft's top speed to 300 mph (480 km/h). (Ref Flight International 29 April 1971 "The evolution of Hucknall") A new engine, the Rolls-Royce PV.12 which would be developed into the Rolls-Royce Merlin, was installed in the Hawker Fury. Using flying test beds subsequent Marks of the Merlin and Griffon engine would be development flight tested at Hucknall throughout the war, including the first flight of the Merlin-powered North American P-51 Mustang.

In early 1940, two Bellman hangars were constructed and as the Battle of Britain started in August a Civilian Repair Organisation operated by Rolls-Royce was established to repair Hurricanes. The organisation also converted 100 Hurricanes to Mark II standard by installing the Rolls-Royce Merlin XX engine. A further conversion programme installed the Merlin 45 into the first Supermarine Spitfire Mk.Vs, and later approximately 300 Spitfire Vs were converted to Mk.IXs. The ferrying of repaired or modified aircraft was the responsibility of No. 1 (RAF) Ferry Pilots Pool and the Air Transport Auxiliary (ATA).

In 1942, the flight test establishment started tests on the new Power Jets Whittle Unit (WU) engine, designed by Sir Frank Whittle. The flying test bed used was a Vickers Wellington with a modified rear fuselage to accept the jet. The engine was developed into the Rolls-Royce Welland and powered early versions of the Gloster Meteor.

During the late 1940s and into the 1950s, the flight test establishment continued tests using the Avro Lancastrian for the testing of Rolls-Royce Nene and Rolls-Royce Avon engines. The Avro Lancasters and Avro Lincolns were used for testing prototype turboprop engines, a Douglas DC-3 being used for the flight test of the Rolls-Royce Dart turboprop and a Gloster Meteor was used for testing a Rolls-Royce RB.50 Trent Turboprop engine.

During the early 1950s, there was an expansion of the flight test establishment infrastructure which included a new hard runway suitable for heavy or fast military aircraft along with a large flight test hangar and upgraded airfield instruments including radar. Most of the buildings including the runway from this period are extant, though the radar and instruments are missing. In 1951, Ronald "Ronnie" Harker took over as the Chief Test Pilot. During the 1950s, he was replaced by Harvey Heyworth followed by his brother Jim Heyworth until 1962. Cliff Rogers was the Chief Test Pilot at Hucknall until 1971. Harvey Heyworth had been a pilot with No. 504 Squadron latterly flying the Hawker Hurricane with Jim Heyworth and Cliff Rogers flying the Vickers Wellington and Avro Lancaster during the war.

In July 1953, the flight test establishment achieved the world's first jet vertical take off and landing (VTOL) with the Nene powered Rolls-Royce Thrust Measuring Rig, also known as the Flying Bedstead. All Rolls-Royce engines (see list of Rolls-Royce engines) from 1934 were tested at Hucknall using flying test bed aircraft, finishing with the Rolls-Royce RB211 22B Turbofan on the Vickers VC10. Most RR powered aircraft since 1934 have been test flown from Hucknall. The flight test establishment closed in 1971 and moved to Filton with operation of the airfield passing to Merlin Flying Club. Ground development testing of RR engines continued using test bed facilities until closure in 2007.

=== Merlin Flying Club ===
In 1962, the Merlin Flying Club (RR employees flying club) arrived at Hucknall from Nottingham (Tollerton) Airport. The club initially had no aircraft but set up its operation on the former wartime RAF south dispersal. The first Chief Flying Instructor was Arthur 'Barney' Barnard, a test pilot at the RR flight test establishment. To enable the club to provide flying training, in 1963 it received an Auster J/4 aircraft registered G-AIPH. Towards the end of 1963 a major overhaul of the Auster took place. The club also modified the aircraft to accept a Continental O-200 engine, replacing the ageing Blackburn Cirrus Minor engine. RR Chief Test Pilot Cliff Rogers conducted the validation flying for the engine modification and overhaul.

In 1966, Gerry Price took over as the Chief Flying Instructor. He was replaced by Ken Whitehurst in 1988, with Colin Hutson taking over later the same year and who continues the role. In 1967, due to high demand for training, the club received a further Auster J/4 with a registration of G-AIJT. This was also later modified with the Continental O-200 engine. From the end of the 1960s, the number of aircraft types at Hucknall expanded through group formation and aircraft building. Previous aircraft based at Hucknall include the following types:

- Jodel D.112 G-AWIG
- Luton Minor G-ATWS
- Beagle Terrier 2 G-ATBU
- de Havilland DH.82A Tiger Moth G-AOEG
- Taylor Monoplane G-BCRJ
- Taylor Monoplane G-BMAO
- Evans VP-1 Volksplane 1 G-PFAG
- Jodel D.120A (see Jodel D.11) G-AZXE
- Whittaker MW5 Sorcerer G-MVHM
- Brügger Colibri MB.2 G-HRLM
- Cessna 120 G-BPWD
- Sopwith Tabloid Replica G-BFDE
- Bristol M.1C Replica G-BLWM
- Hawker Cygnet Replica G-CAMM
- Rans S-10 Sakota G-BSWB
- BAC Drone G-AEDB
- Clutton-Tabenor FRED G-BDBF
- Cassutt Special G-BXMF

In 1972, Auster J/4 G-AIPH was replaced by a Jodel DR1050 Ambassadeur registered as G-AYMT to provide a long-distance touring for qualified pilots. In 1977, Auster J/4 G-AIJT was replaced by a Cessna 150 registered as G-APXY for flying training. Following the use of loan aircraft, in 1983 a further Cessna FA150K Aerobat registered G-BHRH was permanently added for flying and aerobatic training. In 1989, the Jodel DR.1050 was replaced by a Robin DR.220A registered G-BKOV with a further change to Robin DR.220 registered G-BUTH in 1998. Finally, this was also replaced in 1999 by a Robin DR.221B Dauphin registered as G-RRCU for touring and tail wheel training. Between 2001 and 2013, a de Havilland Chipmunk G-BNWT (WP901) was also available for pilot re-validation and tail wheel training. In 2006, Cessna 150 G-APXY was replaced by a Cessna F150L registered as G-YIII. This aircraft was lost in a fatal incident in June 2014.

In August 2014 the following aircraft types were based at Hucknall:

- Cessna FA150K Aerobat G-BHRH
- Robin DR.221B Dauphin G-RRCU
- DH.82 Tiger Moth G-TIGA
- Auster AOP.9 G-BJXR (XR267)
- Jodel D.117A G-AXHV
- JB.01 CAB Minicab G-AVRW
- Pitts Special S.1D G-OODI
- Cessna 120 G-BUKO
- Wittman Tailwind G-BJWT
- Aerosport Scamp G-BKPB (stored)
- Tipsy Nipper G-ARXN (stored)

On 1 March 2015, the Aerodrome was closed by Rolls-Royce and the Merlin Flying Club evicted with a move to Tatenhill Airfield.

=== Air shows and flying ===
The Merlin Flying Club organised two annual events. In June, the Merlin Pageant consisted of flying and static displays from warbird and vintage aircraft; vintage vehicles also featured. In August, the Robin Hood Fly-in was a gathering of general aviation aircraft, with the onus on classic, vintage and homebuilt aircraft types.

=== Air Training Corps ===
In June 2013, 1803 (Hucknall) Squadron of the Air Training Corps (ATC) was extant on the north of the aerodrome.

== Current use ==
During April 2013, a planning application (reference V/2013/0123) was submitted by Muse Developments and Rolls-Royce PLC to Ashfield District Council for a mixed housing and industrial development on the aerodrome, plans which would end flying. In April 2014, outline planning permission was granted. Some tourism and historical interested parties had suggested an alternative future potential for the aerodrome, involving a working museum with a concept similar to the Imperial War Museum Duxford in Cambridgeshire or the Shuttleworth Collection in Bedfordshire. On 1 March 2015, the aerodrome closed permanently with the ground developed for housing and industrial use.
