= Nuthall F.C. =

Nuthall
- Dissolved: 1997

Nuthall F.C. was an English football club based in Nuthall, Nottinghamshire. The clubs was based at the Basil Russell Playing Fields ground in Nuthall.

== History ==
They competed in the Central Midlands League and the FA Vase.

1984-85 They joined Central Midlands League Premier Division

1987 Relegated to Division Two

1988-89 Division Two disbanded, clubs absorbed into Division One

1991-92 Competed in Premier North Division after re-organisation

1992-93 Regional divisions scrapped, single Premier Division formed

1993-94 Central Midlands League Premier Division Champions

1995-96 Promoted to Supreme Division

1997 Left Central Midlands League
