= City of Norwich Aviation Museum =

- Location in Norfolk
- Established: 1977
- Location: Horsham St Faith, Norfolk
- Coordinates: 52.6802°N 1.276°E
- Type: Aviation museum
- Website: www.cnam.org.uk

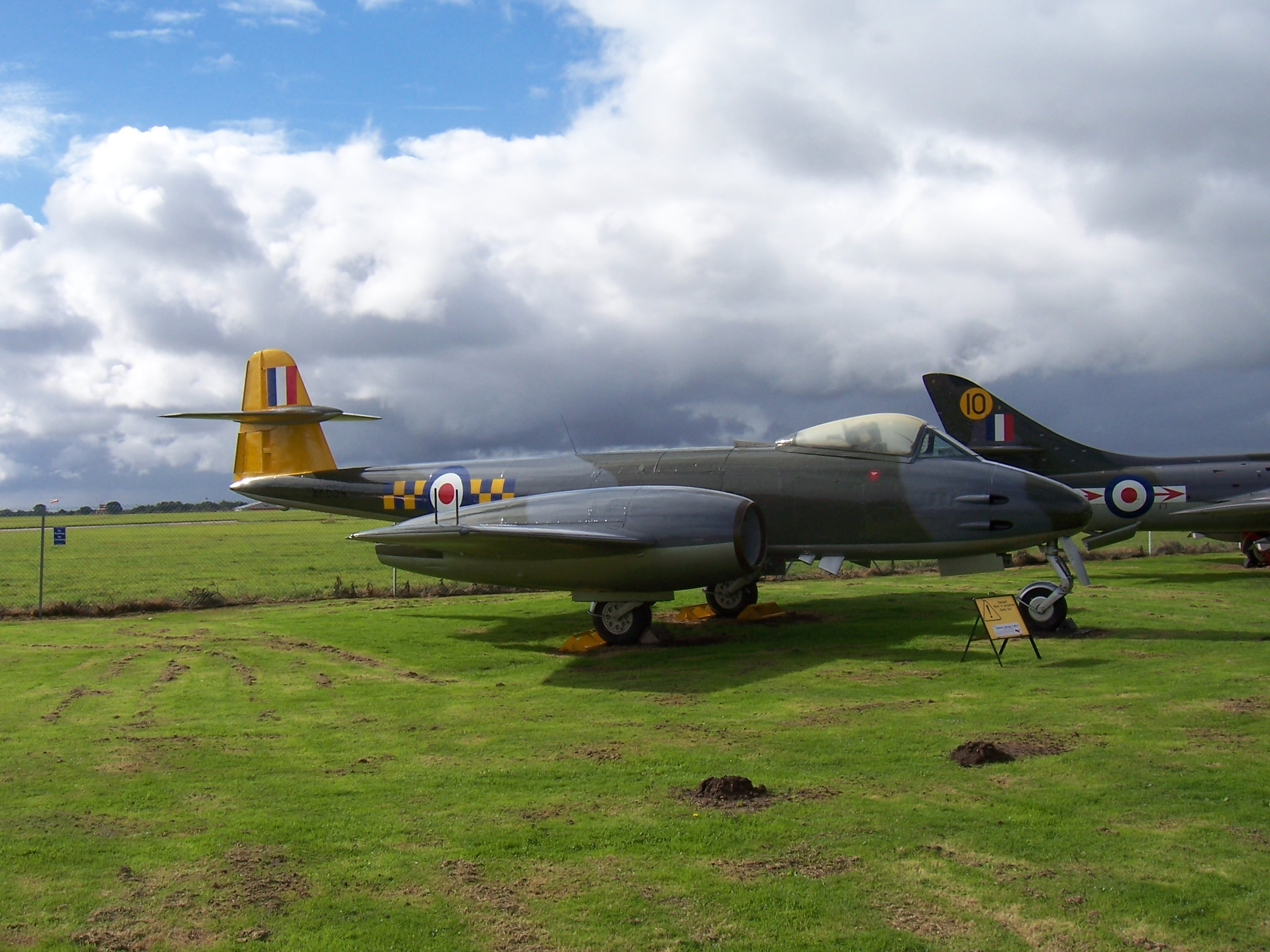
Gloster Meteor F.8 WK654 of the RAF

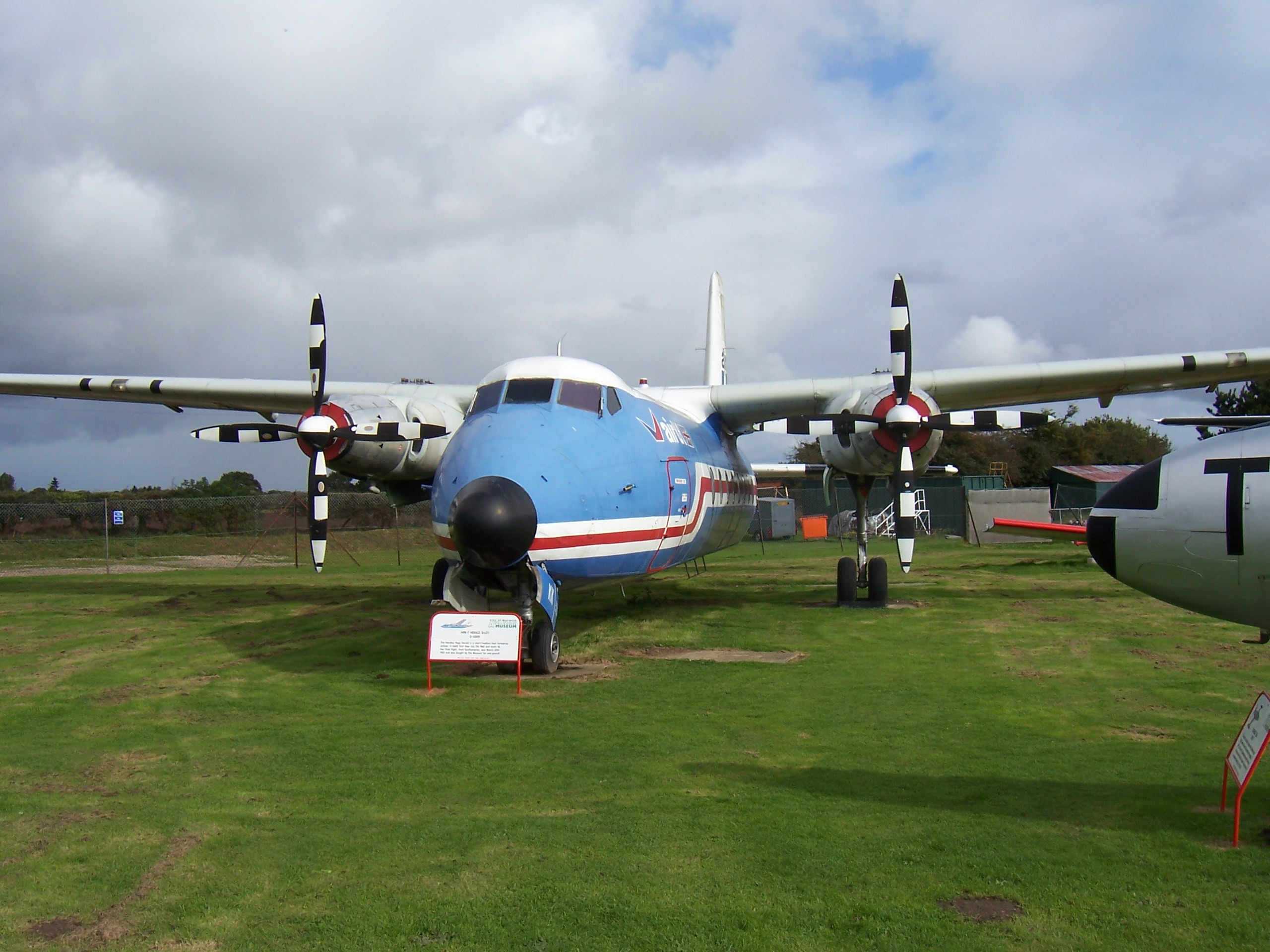
Handley Page Dart Herald G-ASKK formerly operated by Air UK

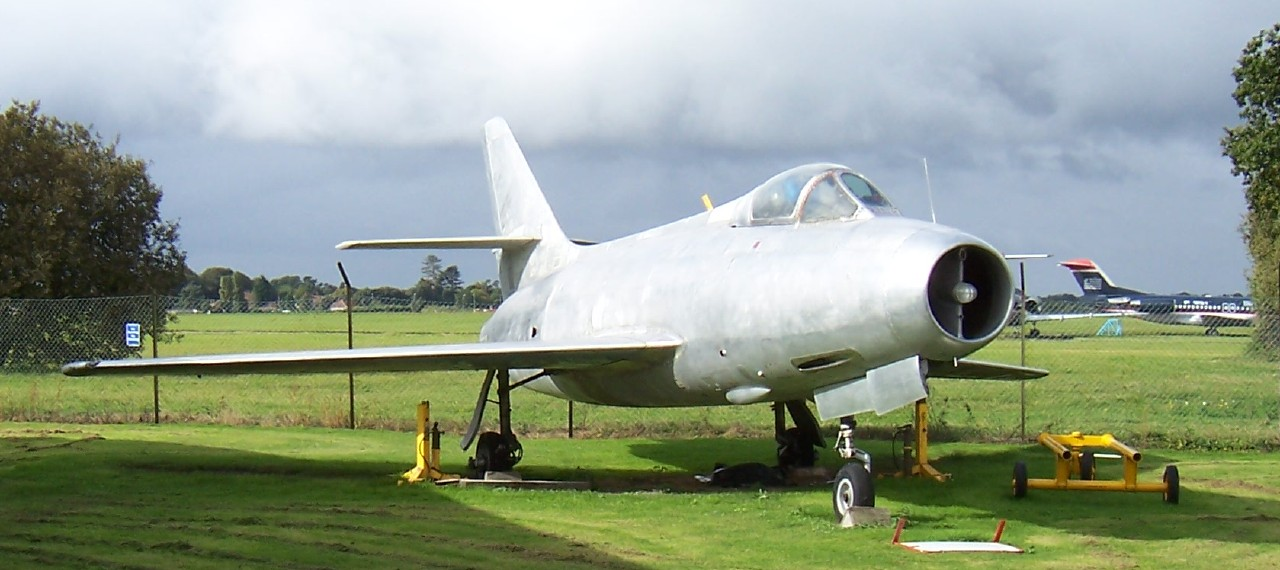
Dassault Mystère IV No.121

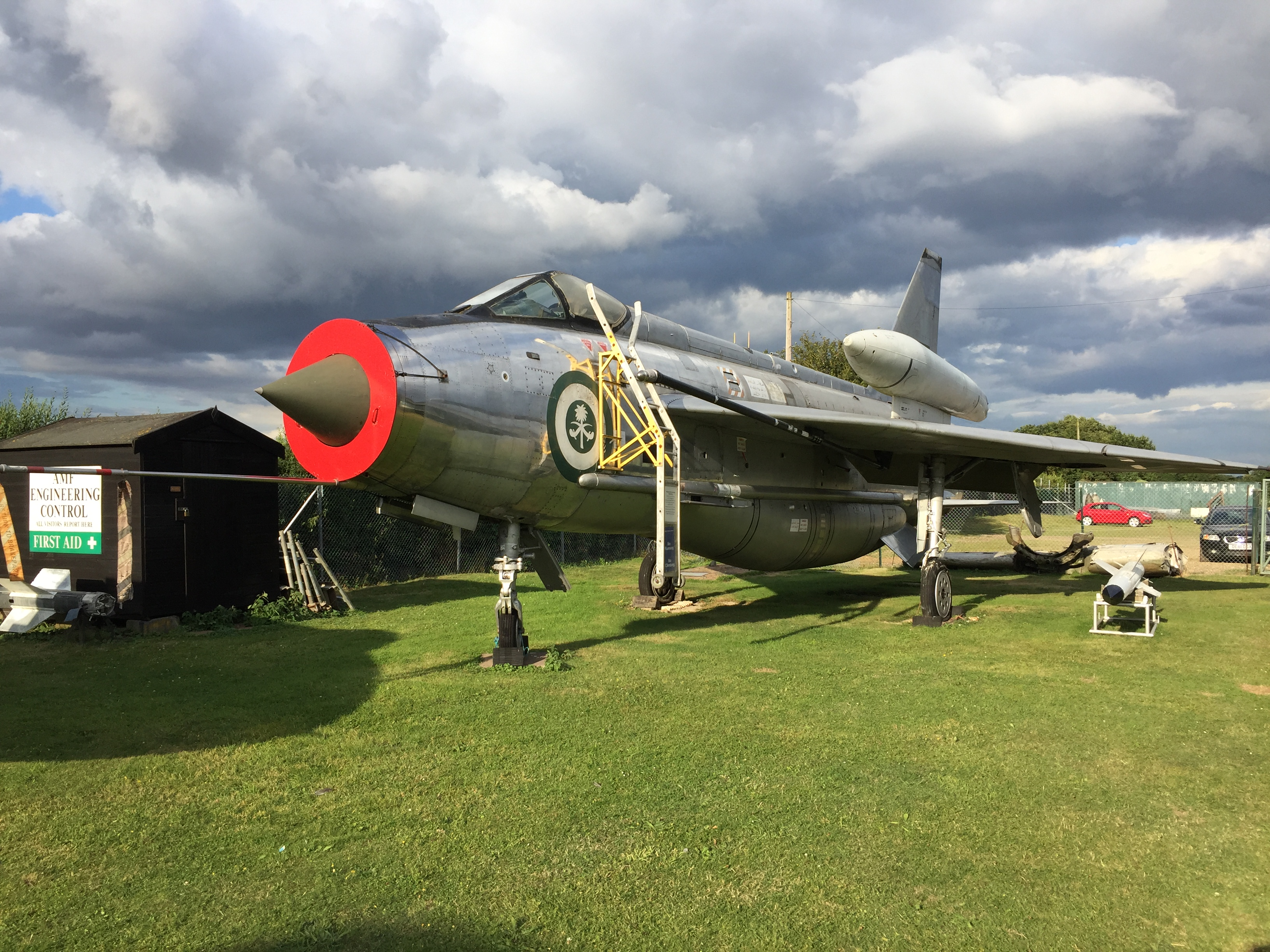
BAC Lightning F.53 - Royal Saudi Air Force 53-686

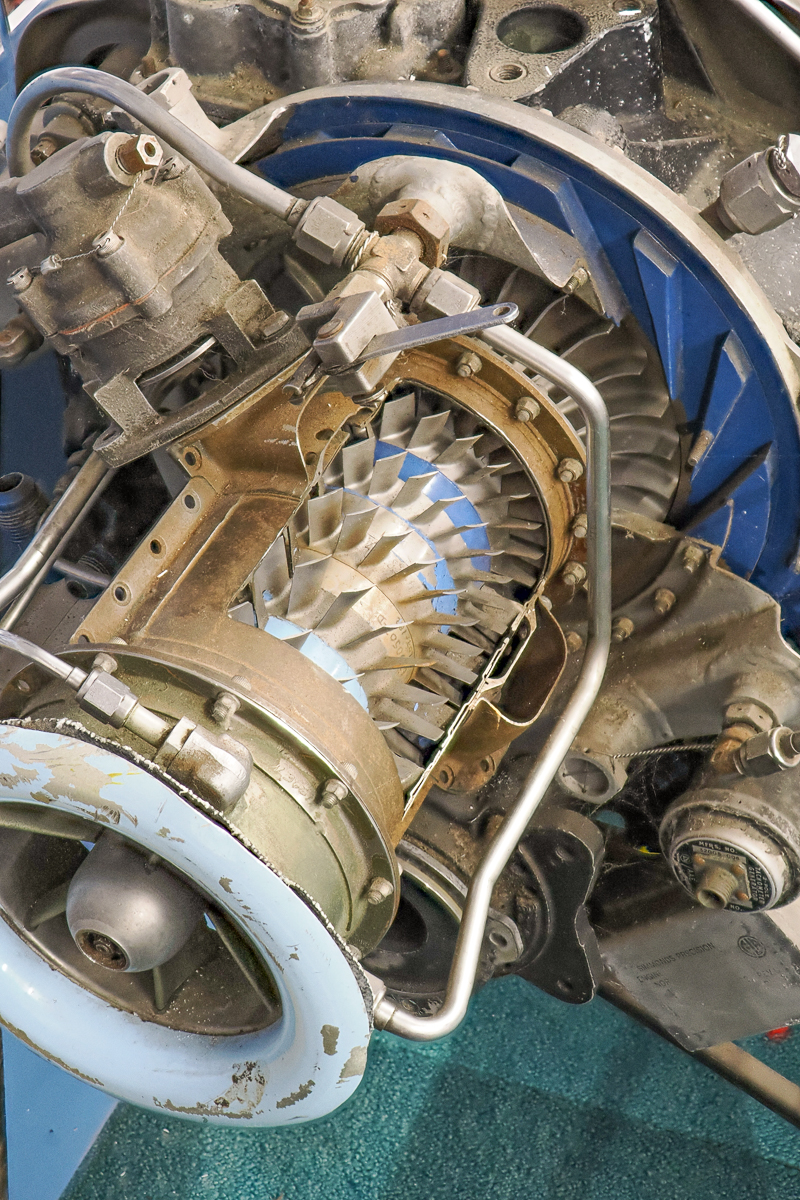
Allison 250 compressor module with 5 axial stages and a final centrifugal stage

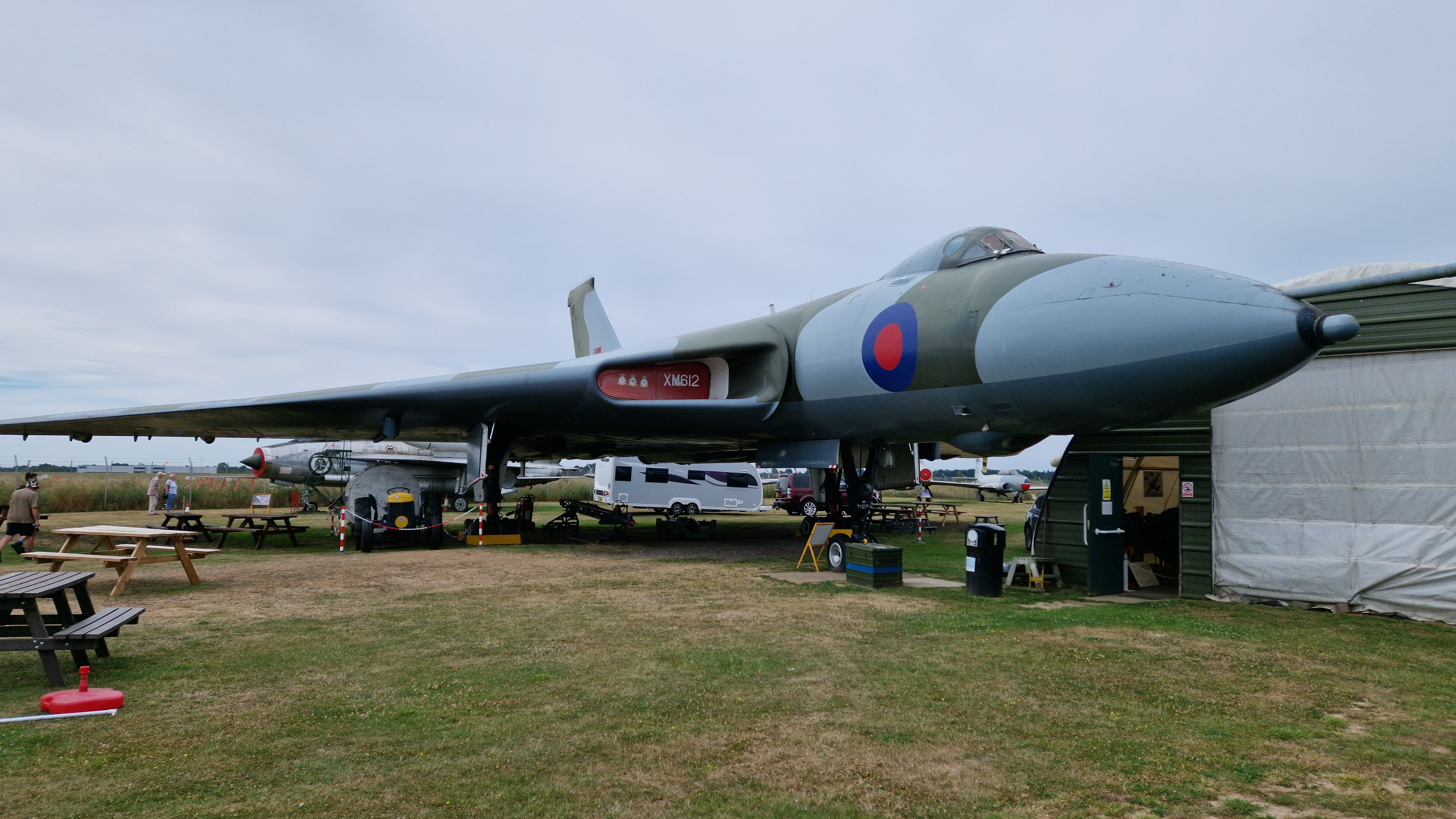
Avro Vulcan XM612

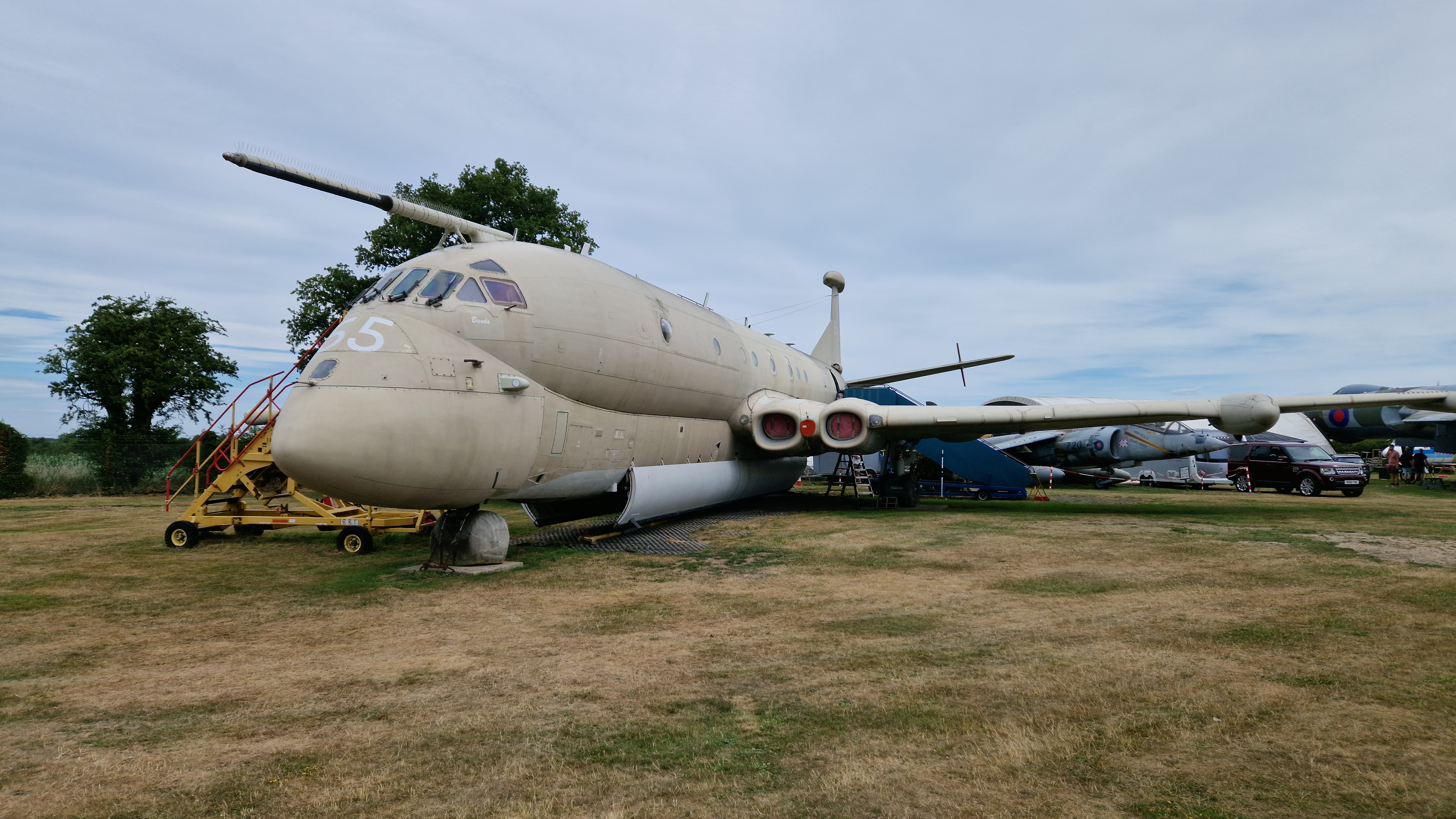
Hawker Siddeley Nimrod XV255

The City of Norwich Aviation Museum is a volunteer-run museum and charitable trust dedicated to the preservation of the aviation history of the county of Norfolk, England. The museum is located on the northern edge of Norwich International Airport and is reached by road through the village of Horsham St Faith.

== History ==
In 2016, a number of aircraft had to be moved to make room for the Northern Distributor Road. Although part of the museum property was given up for the road, the footprint of the museum grew slightly due to a land swap.

The museum welcomed EI-RJN, a 21-year old Avro RJ85, formerly operated by CityJet, as an exhibit in October 2020. The jet had to be lifted over the Northern Distributor Road by crane.

The museum acquired the collections of the Fenland and West Norfolk Aviation Museum in 2022 when the latter closed. At the same time, it began building a new 260 m^{2} (2,800 sq ft) expansion called Fenland Hall to house the collection.

== Collection ==
=== Aircraft on display ===
- Avro RJ85 ‘’EI-RJN / E2351’’
- Avro Vulcan B.2 XM612
- Blackburn Buccaneer S.1 XN967 – cockpit section only
- Cessna 401 G-OVNE
- Dassault Mystère IVA 121
- English Electric Canberra B.15 WH984 – cockpit section only
- English Electric Lightning F.53 53-686/53-700
- Evans VP-2 G-BTAZ
- Fokker F27-200 Friendship G-BCDN
- Fokker F27-600P Friendship G-BHMY
- Gloster Meteor F.8 WK654
- Gloster Meteor NF.11 WM267 – cockpit section only
- Handley Page Dart Herald G-ASKK
- Hawker Hunter Mk.51 E-409 – painted as Royal Air Force XE683
- Hawker Siddeley Nimrod MRA.2 XV255
- Lockheed T-33 51-6718
- McDonnell Douglas Phantom FGR.2 XV426 – cockpit section only
- SOCATA Rallye MS.880B Rallye G-ASAT
- SEPECAT Jaguar GR.1 XX109
- Supermarine Scimitar – CIM cockpit
- Westland Whirlwind HAR.10 XP355
- Piper PA-23-250 Aztec G-AYMO

=== Indoor displays ===
- 100 Group Royal Air Force
- The Royal Air Force in Norfolk
- USAAF Eighth Army Air Force
- The USAAF 2d Air Division
- The USAAF 458th Bombardment Group
- RAF Horsham St Faith
- RAF Marham
- RAF Coltishall
- RAF Sculthorpe
- RAF Swanton Morley
- No. 68 Squadron RAF
- Norwich Int'l Airport

=== Engines on display ===
- Rolls-Royce Avon partially sectioned
- Allison Model 250-C20B partially sectioned
- Allison J33
- Rolls-Royce Derwent RB.37 Mk.8
- Rolls-Royce Gnome H1000
- Rolls-Royce Dart RDa.7
- Rolls-Royce RB.183 Tay 620-15
- Rolls-Royce Nene manufactured by Hispano-Suiza 106/104C
- Rolls-Royce Merlin
- Rolls-Royce Turbomeca Adour RB.172/T.260 Mk.8
- Rolls-Royce Pegasus
- Turbo-Union RB199 Mk.103
- Bristol Hercules
- Armstrong Siddeley Cheetah
- Alvis Leonides

== See also ==
- List of Norfolk airfields
