= Mike Whitaker =

Mike or Michael Whitaker may refer to:

- Michael Whitaker, equestrian
- Michael Whitaker (government official), administrator of the Federal Aviation Administration
- Mike Whitaker (American football), in 2010 Fort Wayne FireHawks season
- Mike Whitaker (swimmer), Canadian swimmer

== See also ==
- Michael Whittaker (disambiguation)
