= Evans VP-2 =

American homebuilt light aircraft

VP-2
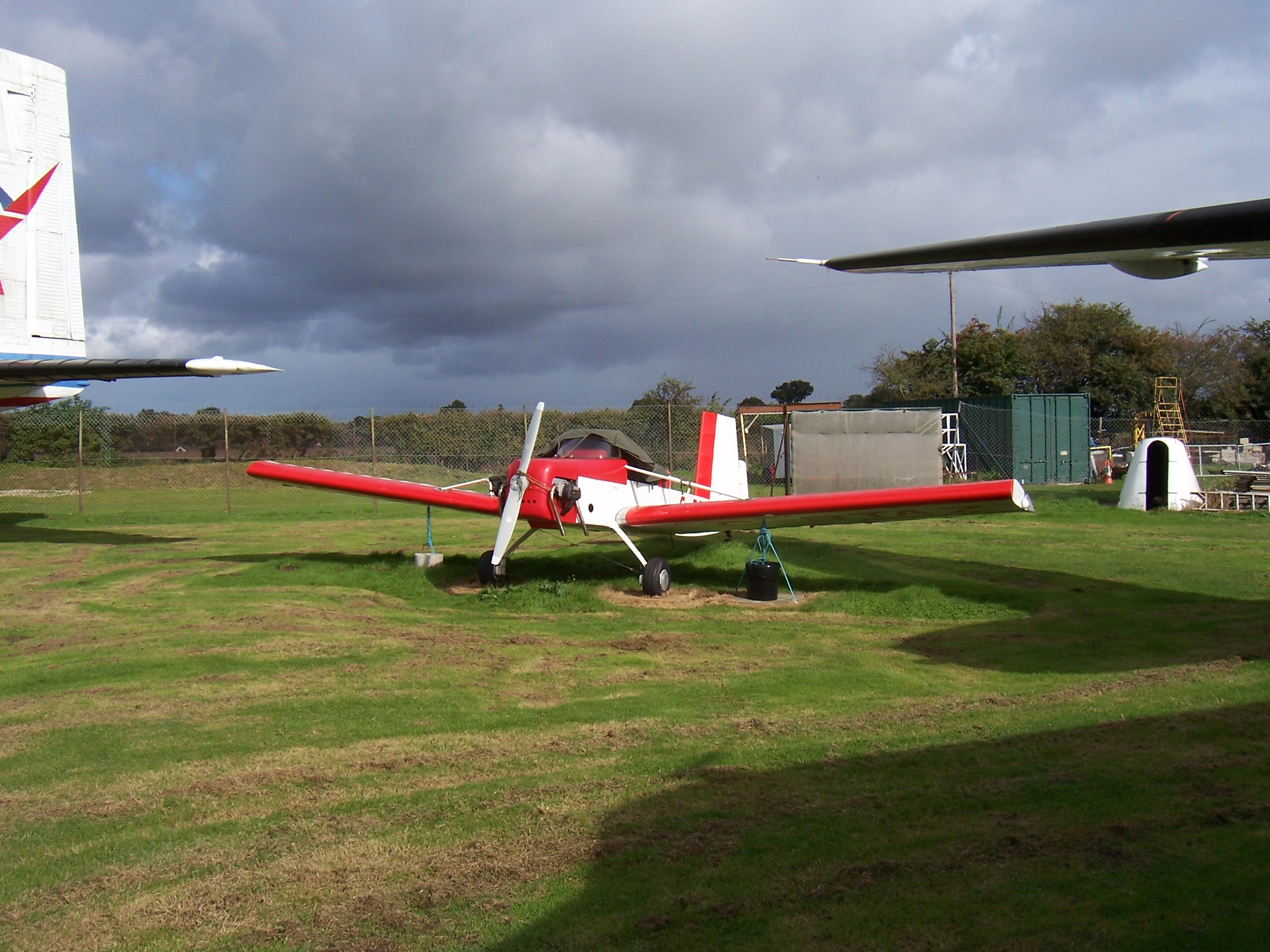
- Evans VP-2 G-BTAZ preserved at the City of Norwich Aviation Museum in Norfolk, England

General information
- Type: Homebuilt aircraft
- National origin: United States
- Designer: William Samuel Evans
- Status: Plans available

History
- First flight: 1971

The Evans VP-2 is a development of the Evans VP-1 Volksplane, both of which were designed in La Jolla, California by aeronautical engineer William Samuel "Bud" Evans. Evans had formerly worked at Convair, Ryan Aircraft and General Dynamics.

== Design and development ==
Work on the design of the VP-1, was completed between 1966 and 1968, the intention being that the design would be simple to build for a novice working at home. The design was successful, and, following a first flight in September 1968, a large number of aircraft have been constructed by homebuilders. The aircraft are usually powered by converted Volkswagen air-cooled engines.

The VP-1 is a single-seat open-cockpit low-wing monoplane manufactured from spruce and plywood with fabric covered wings. Performance is typically a cruise speed of 75 mph (121 km/h) and a stall speed of 40 mph (64 km/h).

Following the success of the VP-1 a two-seat variant, the VP-2 was designed to meet normal category limits, which are 3.8 positive and 1.9 negative g. The first VP-2 (then known as VP II) flew in 1971.

The VP-2 is externally similar in appearance to the VP-1 but with a 1 ft (30 cm) wider fuselage and enlarged cockpit section to accommodate two side-by-side configuration seats. The aircraft is 1 ft (30 cm) longer and has a 3 ft (0.9 m) addition to wingspan. The VP-2 can use any Volkswagen air-cooled engine model from 1,834 to 2,100 cc. Other similar powerplants can be substituted.

== Operational history ==
Although numerous examples of the VP-2 were constructed from plans provided by the Evans Aircraft Company, the VP-2 is no longer being offered with the company having stopped marketing the VP-2 and responding to technical inquiries. The main concern from the company was that the VP-2 may have liability issues associated with two-seat aircraft. VP-2 plans and modified VP-2 plans remain available on the Internet, although the Evans Aircraft Company neither authorizes nor approves of these plans.

== Preserved examples ==
- City of Norwich Aviation Museum, Norfolk, England

== Specifications (60 hp engine) ==
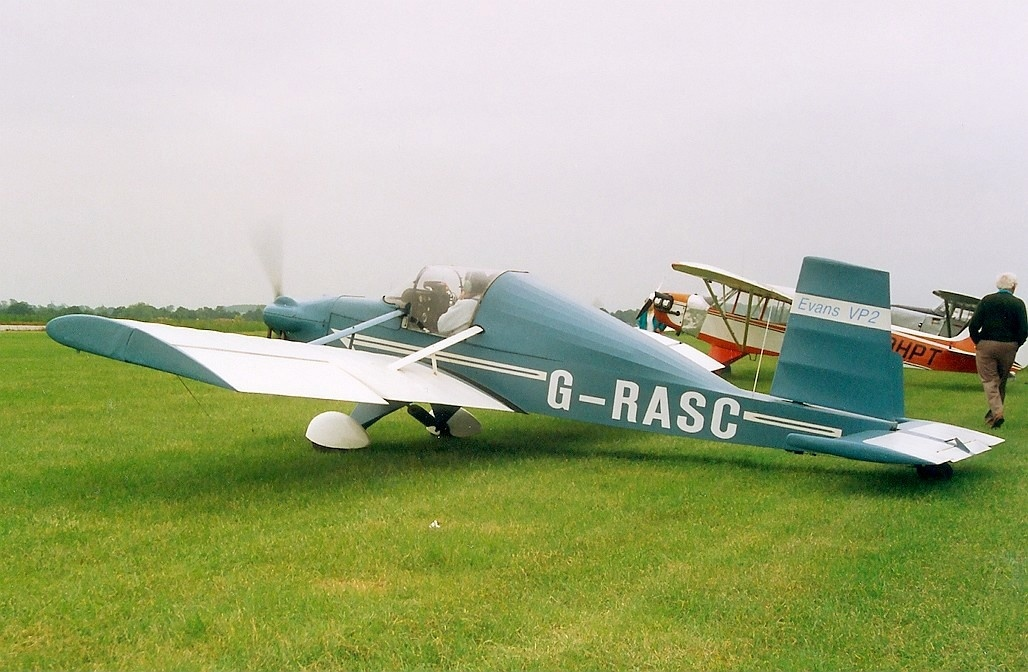
Evans VP-2

Data from Jane's All The World's Aircraft 1982–83

General characteristics

- Crew: one
- Capacity: one passenger
- Length: 19 ft 3 in (5.87 m)
- Wingspan: 27 ft 0 in (8.23 m)
- Wing area: 130 sq ft (12 m^{2})
- Airfoil: NACA 4415
- Empty weight: 640 lb (290 kg)
- Gross weight: 1,040 lb (472 kg)
- Fuel capacity: 14 US gallons (53 L)
- Powerplant: 1 × Volkswagen air-cooled engine 1,834 cc flat-four, 60 hp (45 kW)

Performance

- Maximum speed: 100 mph (160 km/h, 87 kn)
- Cruise speed: 75 mph (121 km/h, 65 kn)
- Stall speed: 40 mph (64 km/h, 35 kn)
- Never exceed speed: 120 mph (190 km/h, 100 kn)
- Rate of climb: 700 ft/min (3.6 m/s) (pilot only)
