= Listed buildings in Nuthall =

Nuthall is a civil parish in the Borough of Broxtowe, Nottinghamshire, England. The parish contains 15 listed buildings that are recorded in the National Heritage List for England. Of these, two are listed at Grade II*, the middle of the three grades, and the others are at Grade II, the lowest grade. The parish contains the village of Nuthall and the surrounding area. It once contained the country house of Nuthall Temple, but this was demolished in 1929. However, three buildings in its grounds have survived and are listed, namely, a summer house, a bridge and a gate pier. The other listed buildings consist of houses, cottages and associated structures, farmhouses and farm buildings, and a church and headstones in the churchyard.

== Key ==
Grade	Criteria
II*	Particularly important buildings of more than special interest
II	Buildings of national importance and special interest

== Buildings ==
Name and location	Photograph	Date	Notes	Grade
St Patrick's Church; 52.99514°N 1.23456°W		13th century	The church has been altered and extended through the centuries, including alterations by James Fowler in 1884. It is built in stone, and has roofs of slate, copper and lead. The church consists of a nave, a north aisle, a south porch, a chancel, two vestries and an organ chamber, and a west tower. The tower has two stages, a west doorway with a hood mould, a string course and an embattled parapet.	II*
Hempshill Hall; 52.99123°N 1.21875°W		1492	A country house that has been extended. It has a timber-framed core, it has been encased in brick and rendered, and has a roof of tile and slate. There are two storeys and attics, and a front of eight bays. Most of the windows are casements, and on the south front are two buttresses, a canted bay window with a hipped roof, and four French windows. The west front has a porch and a staircase enclosure, both with hipped roofs. Inside, there is exposed timber framing.	II
Hempshill Hall Farmhouse; 52.99150°N 1.21873°W		17th century	The farmhouse is in sandstone and brick, rendered on two sides, with a slate roof, the south gable coped with kneelers. There are two storeys, four bays, and a single-storey extension on the left. The doorway has a fanlight, and the windows on the front are sashes, those flanking the doorway with miniature iron balconies. On the north front is a porch and casement windows.	II
Home Farmhouse and coach house 52.99390°N 1.23331°W	—	17th century	A farmhouse converted into three houses and an attached coach house, in stone, partly rendered, with quoins, a moulded eaves cornice, and slate roofs with stone coped gables and kneelers. There are two storeys and a south front of eleven bays. The left house has three bays, a central round-headed doorway with a fanlight and a keystone, and above it is a Diocletian window. The other two houses have two bays each, and the windows are casements in all houses. To the right is a round-headed doorway and two segmental-headed carriage arches, all with keystones. Above them is a clock face and a Diocletian window, and in the west front is an external stone staircase leading to a loft doorway.	II
Farm buildings to rear of Home Farmhouse; 52.99422°N 1.23333°W	—	1664	The farm buildings have been extended through the centuries, and form three ranges around a crewyard. They are in stone and brick, and have slate roofs. The east range has a single storey, and is without a roof. The north range has three storeys to the west, and a lower barn range to the west, and at the northwest corner is a former granary. The west range is irregular and has two storeys.	II
Two headstones 52.99508°N 1.23439°W	—	c. 1670	The headstones are in the churchyard of St Patrick's Church to the south of the chancel. They are in stone, each has a round head, one has a moulded border, and both have inscriptions.	II
1 Nottingham Road; 52.99544°N 1.23336°W		Early 18th century	A public house, later a private house, in colourwashed roughcast stone on plinths, with stone dressings, and a pantile roof with coped gables. There are two storeys and attics and an L-shaped plan, with a front range of two bays and a rear wing. Steps lead up to the central doorway, the windows are casements, and there are two gabled dormers.	II
Gatepier, Nuthall Temple; 52.99525°N 1.23311°W		c. 1754	The gate pier is in stone, and has a square plan and a plinth. There are three bands, a moulded cornice, and a pedimented cornice. The north and south sides contain a round-headed niche.	II
Gothic Summerhouse; 52.99402°N 1.23405°W	—	1759	The summerhouse is in Gothic style, and is in the garden of the former Nuthall Temple. It is in stone and brick on a stone plinth, and has a string course, embattled parapets, and a tile roof with coped gables. The west front has a projecting central bay, and is flanked by round corner towers, each containing a blank quatrefoil. On the north and south sides are blocked openings, and the east side has a lean-to with central gable containing a round opening with pigeonholes.	II*
The Lake Bridge; 52.99259°N 1.24151°W	—	c. 1759	The bridge crosses the end of a lake in the grounds of the former Nuthall Temple, and is in Gothic style. It is in stone with a moulded band, and consists of two depressed four-centred arches with imposts and hood moulds.	II
The Old Rectory and Rectory Grange; 52.99539°N 1.23421°W		1761	The rectory, later two houses, is in stone and brick, on a stone plinth, with stone dressings, deep eaves, and a roof of tile and slate with coped gables. There are two storeys and attics, and an irregular L-shaped plan, with a front range of seven bays. The east front has a recessed central doorway with a fanlight, and is flanked by Venetian windows. The windows in the upper floor are sashes with keystones, and above is a central gable containing a round-headed sash window. To the right is a two-storey rendered service wing containing a round-headed casement window. At the rear is a hipped stair enclosure on iron columns, and a bow window.	II
3 Nottingham Road; 52.99547°N 1.23319°W		Late 18th century	Two cottages combined into one house, it is in stone with a slate roof, two storeys and two bays. Brick steps with railings lead up to the doorway on the left. The windows are casements, and all but one have splayed lintels and keystones.	II
7 Nottingham Road; 52.99547°N 1.23300°W		Early 19th century	Two cottages combined into one house, it is in stone with a slate roof. There are two storeys and attics, two bays, and a later rear two-storey extension. The doorway in the right bay has a fanlight, and the corresponding doorway on the left is blocked. The windows are sashes with splayed stucco lintels. The west gable has a rounded corner, and contains a doorway with a segmental head.	II
Spencer House; 52.99908°N 1.23865°W	—	Early 19th century	The house is stuccoed, on a stone plinth, and has boxed eaves and a slate roof with shouldered coped gables. There are two storeys, three bays, and a single-storey rear wing. The central doorway is round-headed, with a moulded surround, a fanlight and a keystone, and the windows are sashes. At the southeast end is a doorway with reeded columns, a Gothick fanlight and a pediment, and at the rear is an outbuilding with a pyramidal slate roof and an octagonal cupola with a wind vane.	II
The Cottage; 52.99534°N 1.23599°W	—	Early 19th century	A stuccoed house on a moulded stone plinth, with coved eaves and a hipped slate roof. There are two storeys, three bays, and a rear wing. In the centre is a doorway with a reeded surround, paterae, and a geometrical fanlight, and the windows on the front are sashes with jalousies. On the east side are casement windows, and the west has a single-storey gabled outbuilding, a porch and a conservatory.	II
