= Ronald Thomas Shepherd =

British aviator and test pilot

- Born: 1896; Kensington London, England
- Died: 1 March 1955 (aged 58–59); Nuthall, Nottinghamshire, England
- Occupations: Aviator and Test Pilot
- Employer: Rolls-Royce Limited
- Awards: OBE

Ronald Thomas Shepherd OBE (1896 – 1 March 1955) was a British aviator and test pilot for Rolls-Royce. He was the first person to fly an aircraft powered by the Rolls-Royce Merlin aero-engine.

== Early life ==
Shepherd was born in Kensington, London in 1896 the son of Thomas and Agnes Shepherd, his father was a lithographic printer.

== Career ==
At first he was employed by Vickers-Armstrongs in the manufacture of guns but on the outbreak of the First World War he joined the Honourable Artillery Company. Shepherd joined the Royal Flying Corps in 1916 where he flew with 102 Squadron and 37 Squadron. He left the RFC (now the Royal Air Force) in 1918 but re-joined in 1921 and served in England and Egypt until 1929.

After a few years as a civilian flying instructor he joined Rolls-Royce in 1931. In 1935 he was appointed chief test pilot. Shepherd was responsible for the first flight of many of the company's aero engines, including the Merlin, Kestrel and Griffon piston engines and the Nene and Avon jet engines.

After a serious illness in 1951 he relinquished his chief test pilot role and became an aviation consultant. Although no longer flying full-time, on 3 July 1953, aged 58, he made the first free flight of the unusual Rolls-Royce Thrust Measuring Rig, a pioneering vertical take-off and landing experimental aircraft at Hucknall Aerodrome.

He was appointed an Officer of the Order of the British Empire in 1946 for his work as a test pilot, particularly in the development of the Merlin. He died on 1 March 1955 at his home at Nuthall and was buried in the village's New Farm Lane cemetery.
