= Nuthall Temple =

Building in United Kingdom

Coordinates: 52.96°N 1.27°W

Nuthall Temple photographed in 1906. The house was demolished in 1929.

Nuthall Temple in Nottinghamshire, one of England's lost houses, was one of five houses built in the United Kingdom generally said to have been inspired by Palladio's Villa Capra in Vicenza.

Only two 18th-century examples remain: Mereworth Castle and Chiswick House. Both are today conserved as Grade I listed buildings. The fourth, Foots Cray Place, was demolished in 1950 after a fire in 1949, while the fifth, Henbury Hall, was built in the 1980s.

== History ==
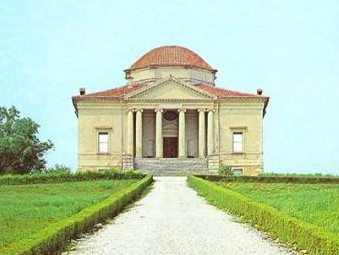
Villa Pisani, also called La Rocca Pisana

Nuthall Temple was completed in 1757 for Sir Charles Sedley, 2nd Baronet, towards the end of the Neo-Palladian fashion in England. Nuthall Temple does not follow the imitation of Villa Capra "La Rotonda" as closely as its earlier prototypes, although the homage to Palladio's concepts is strongly pronounced. In fact, the house bears a closer resemblance to Rocca Pisana (1578) by Palladio's follower Vincenzo Scamozzi. This similarity makes the architecture of Nuthall extremely interesting as Scamozzi's building, like Nuthall, has a recessed portico rather than prostyle inserted within the facade. This was to become a strong feature of the neoclassical architecture which was to follow Palladianism in the United Kingdom and makes Nuthall avant-garde in its late Palladianism.

The design is attributed to Thomas Wright whose patron was a country landowner, Sir Charles Sedley. The house was designed around a 58 ft high hall beneath the central dome. The hall was decorated with rococo plaster-work of a standard easily equal to that at Claydon House. In 1778 Sedley commissioned James Wyatt to undertake a number of alterations. Externally these included the installation of Venetian windows on the garden front and the lowering of balustrades below some others. Internally the redesign of the music room in a neo-Classical style illustrated how much taste had changed within a short period of time.

The final residential owner of Nuthall Temple was the Reverend Robert Holden, Rector of the Parish, whose family had owned the estate since Robert Holden purchased it in 1819 at auction for his second son. The Holdens were an established Derbyshire family who had both invested heavily in the purchase of land and through marriage ties had connections with many of the neighbouring landowning families. In the early nineteenth century Nuthall was the home of a junior branch of the Holden family and although briefly let between 1844 and 1853 was well maintained including various improvements to both the interior and exterior of the property.

When the Reverend Robert Holden died in 1926 his son Robert Millington Holden succeeded to the estate. Owing to falling agricultural rents and outstanding estate duties owed to the state he was forced to consider selling the property. Initially at auction on the 2 November 1927 the Temple and parkland of 650 acres was left unsold. By the inter-war period, high taxation, agricultural decline and decreasing social and political control meant that landowners now focused increasingly upon financial survival over social splendours. Nuthall and its remaining land were subsequently sold privately. Fittings sold at auction in 529 lots on 23 and 24 May 1929.

== Demolition ==
The remaining shell was sold for £800 to J.H. Brough and Co. of Beeston, who later that summer presided over the public demolition.

On 31 July 1929 the west wing was loaded with firelighters, sprinkled with paraffin and set alight to the delight of a large expectant crowd. The weakened structure was then pulled down wall by wall.

The ruined shell of Nuthall remained, once all of saleable value including much of the building material had been claimed, until 1966 when this too was finally pulled down in order to make way for the extension of the M1 motorway. The site of the former house is now under one of the slip roads at Junction 26 within the remnants of its parkland landscape.

Some features of the house were incorporated into Temple Wood House in Frogshall, Northrepps.

== See also ==
- Listed buildings in Nuthall

== Sources and external links ==
- dal Lago, Adalbert (1969): Villas and Palaces of Europe. Paul Hamlyn. ISBN 978-0-600-01235-1
- Broxtowe Borough Council website: Nuthall Parish, with information on the Temple retrieved 22 March 2009
- Nuthall Temple by Mrs Holden retrieved 23 March 2007
