= Evans VP-1 Volksplane =

American homebuilt airplane

VP-1 Volksplane
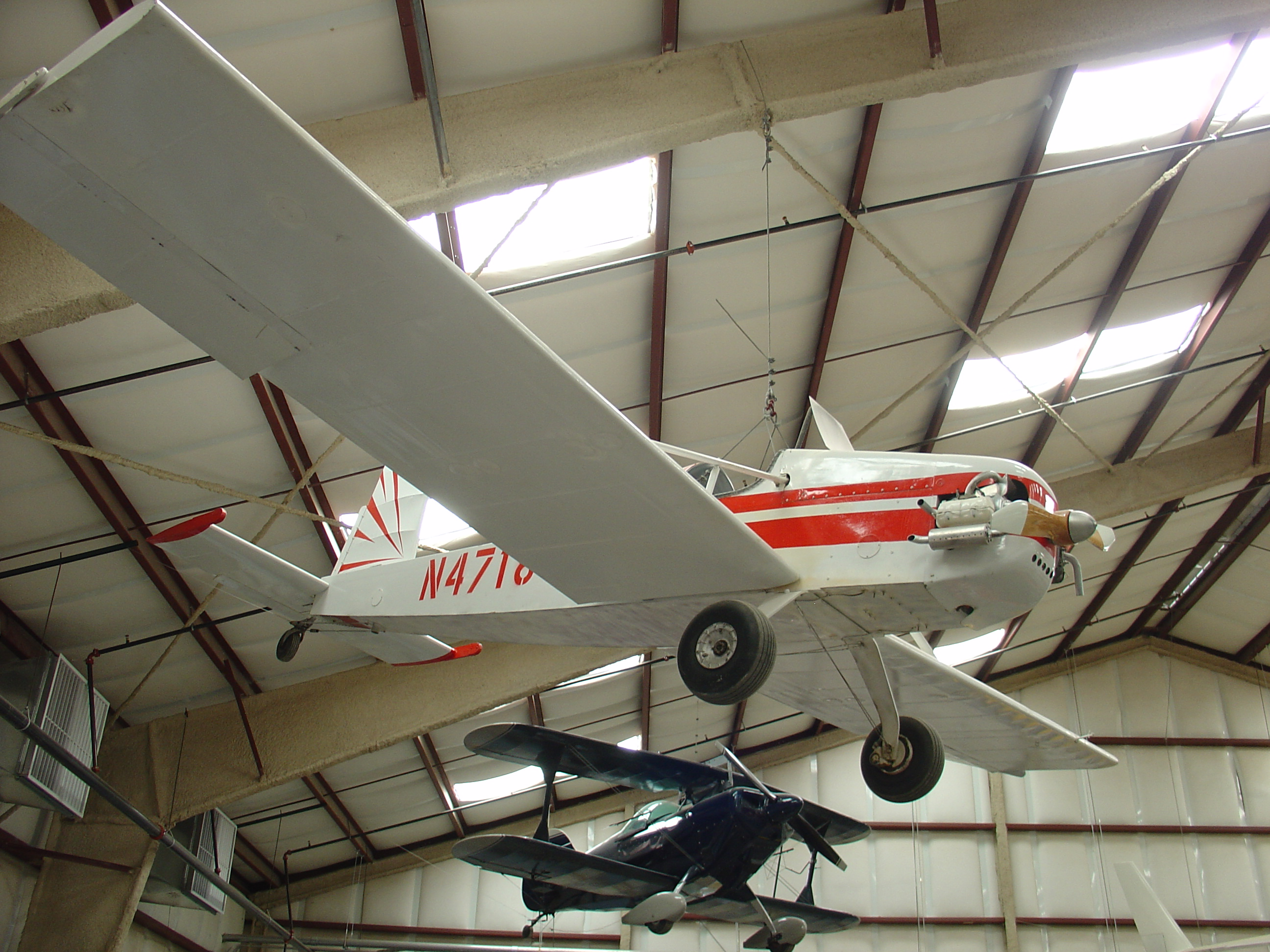
- Evans VP-1 Volksplane at Pima Air and Space Museum

General information
- Type: homebuilt light monoplane
- Manufacturer: Homebuilt
- Designer: William Samuel Evans

History
- Manufactured: over 6,000 sets of plans have been sold
- First flight: September 1968

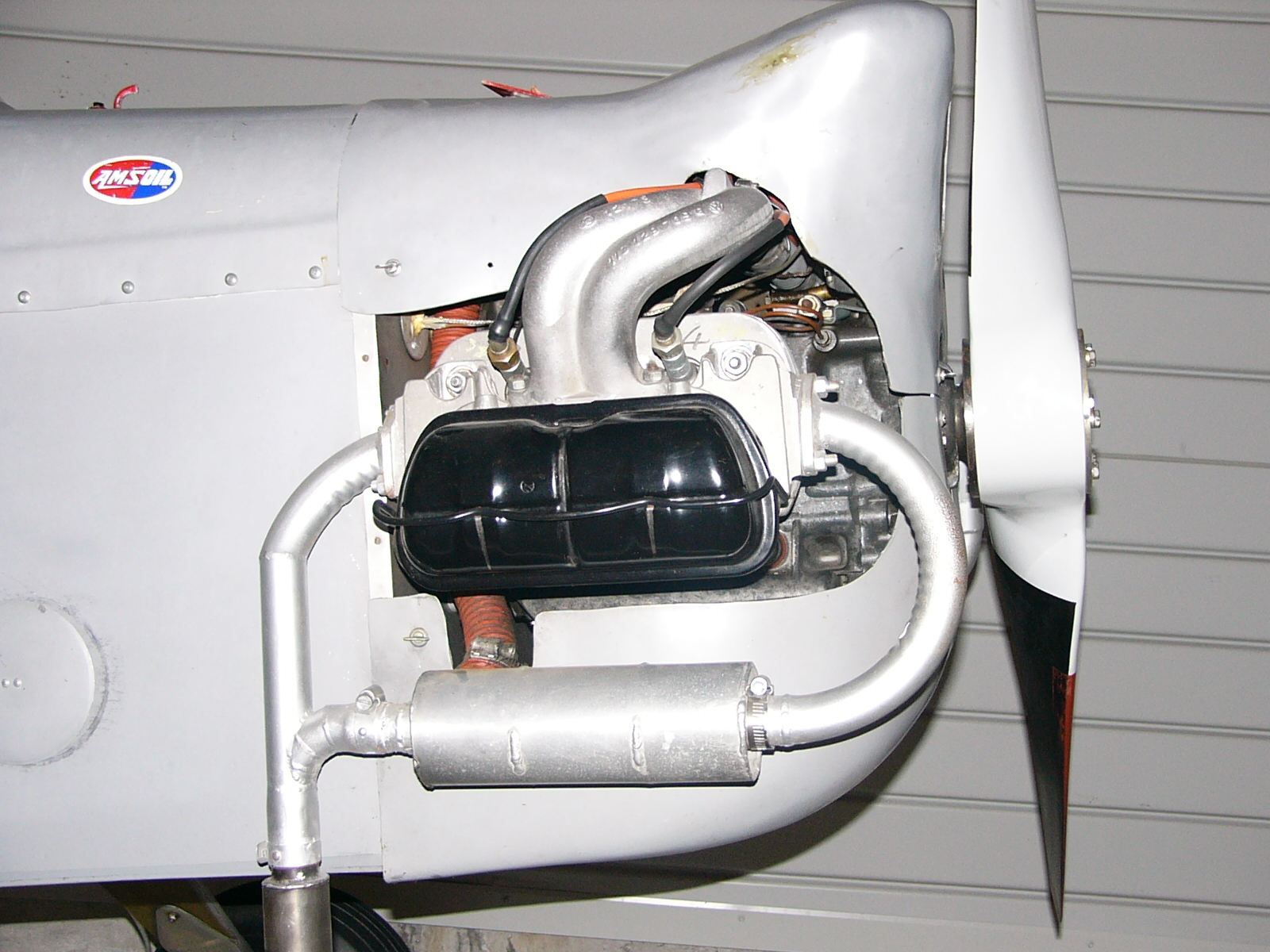
A Volkswagen engine installed in an Evans VP-1 Volksplane at the Canada Aviation and Space Museum.

The Evans VP-1 Volksplane is an American designed aircraft for amateur construction. The aircraft was designed by former Convair, Ryan Aircraft and General Dynamics aeronautical engineer William Samuel Evans of La Jolla, California.

== Design and development ==
In 1966, Evans began engineering work on the VP-1, choosing an all-wood, strut-braced open-cockpit single-seat low-wing design for ease in amateur construction. Designed to be simple to build and safe to fly, performance and appearance is of secondary importance. To make construction simple, marine grade plywood is used for the slab-sided fuselage structure. The wings are designed to be detachable to allow the aircraft to transported by road.

The VP-1 was designed specifically to utilize a modified VW Type 1 automotive engine from the VW Beetle. The fuselage is built in a warren truss arrangement where the exterior plywood takes the diagonal stress loads, therefore eliminating the diagonal members to maintain simplicity. The vertical and upright members are staggered to keep the joints as simple as possible. The wing is of a forward and aft blank spar design which uses stack-cut plywood ribs of equal size in order to keep construction time down. The ailerons are hinged directly behind the aft spar. For simplicity no flaps are provided. The wings and tail surfaces are fabric covered.

Because the design lacks aerodynamic refinement, the Volksplane requires more power than most aircraft its weight to fly. Some builders have altered the fuselage design to improve the aerodynamics and aesthetics.

The design was developed into a two-seat version, the Evans VP-2, with an enlarged cockpit although this variant is no longer being offered.

== Operational history ==
The Volksplane first flew in September 1968. Offered as a set of plans, and marketed as a "fun" aircraft, the Volksplane was immediately popular with home builders who saw it as an inexpensive and easy-to build project. A number of examples have been built with variations in the design. In 1973, Mohog, a mahogany-skinned Volksplane, with further modifications to the basic design incorporating monocoque wings, strengthened roll bar and a blown bubble canopy, was built by the Wosika family of El Cajon, California, at a cost of $3,000.

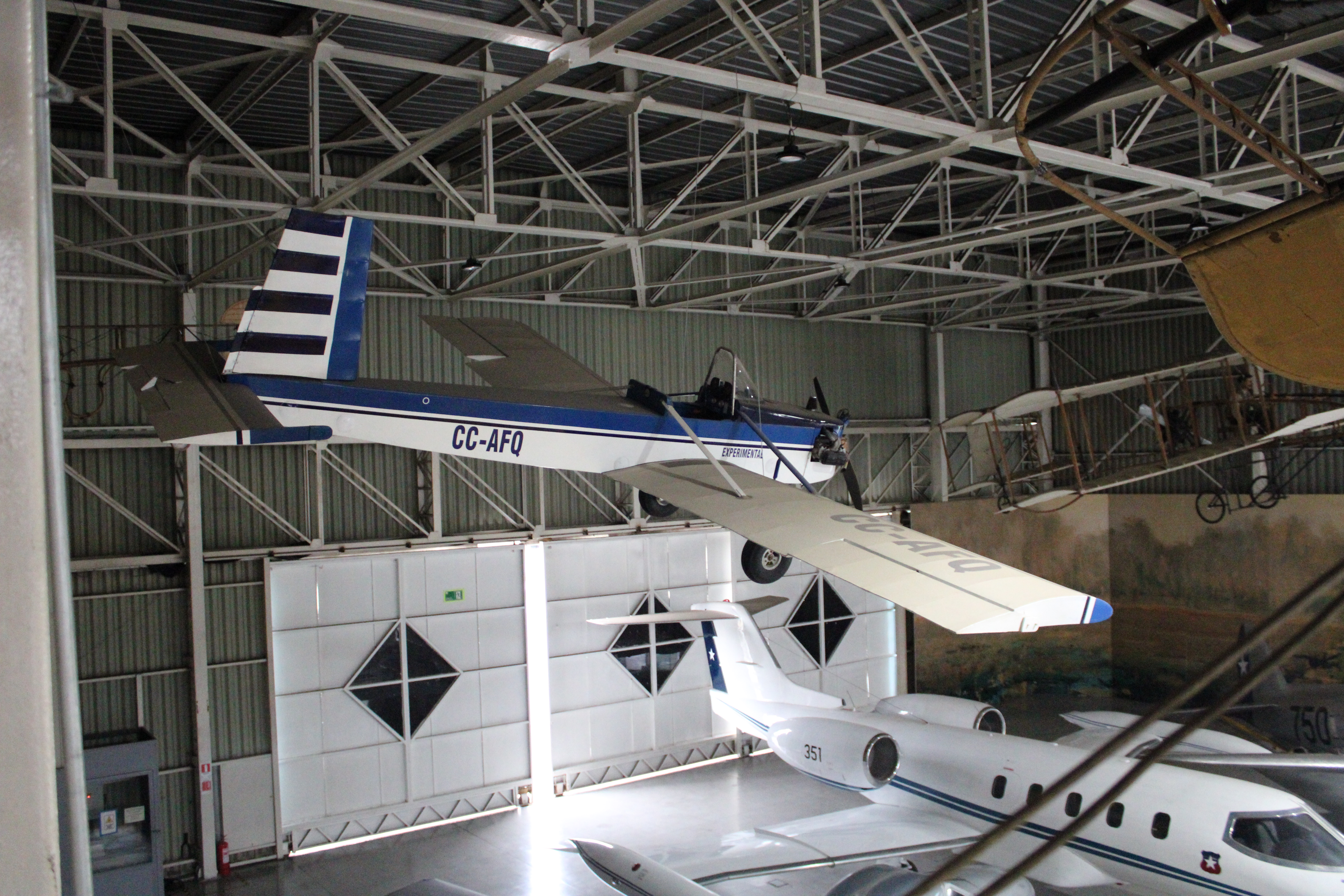
The VP-1 seen from the (right) side.

Construction of the Volksplane is relatively straightforward, and, according to some home builders, almost like building a "giant model aircraft". Flying characteristics are relatively benign, as the intent was to create a simple, and easy-to-fly aircraft. Although not intended to be an aerobatic design, gentle "aileron rolls, lazy eights, wingovers, chandelles and steep stalls" have been conducted. A total of approximately 6,000 plans have been sold to date.

== Variants ==
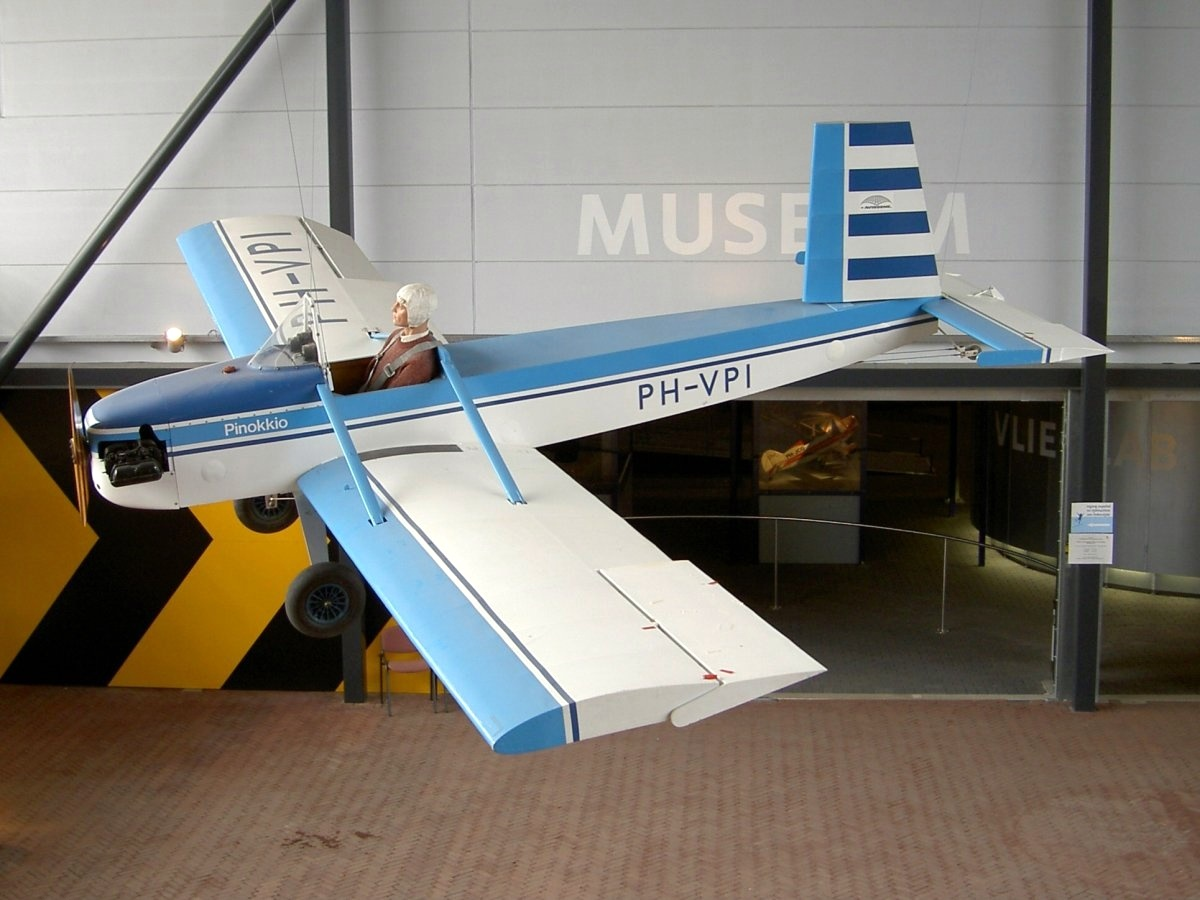
Evans VP-1 Volksplane

Evans VP-1
Single-seat homebuilt
Evans VP-2
Two-seat homebuilt

== Specifications (VP-1 – 40 hp engine) ==
Data from Jane's All The World's Aircraft 1982–83

General characteristics

- Crew: 1
- Length: 18 ft 0 in (5.49 m)
- Wingspan: 24 ft 0 in (7.32 m)
- Height: 5 ft 1.5 in (1.562 m)
- Wing area: 100 sq ft (9.3 m^{2})
- Airfoil: NACA 4412
- Empty weight: 440 lb (200 kg)
- Max takeoff weight: 750 lb (340 kg)
- Powerplant: 1 × Volkswagen 4-cylinder air-cooled horizontally-opposed piston engine, 40 hp (30 kW)
- Propellers: 2-bladed fixed-pitch propeller

Performance

- Cruise speed: 65 kn (75 mph, 120 km/h)
- Stall speed: 35 kn (40 mph, 65 km/h)
- Never exceed speed: 104 kn (120 mph, 193 km/h)
- Rate of climb: 400 ft/min (2.0 m/s)

== See also ==
Aircraft of comparable role, configuration, and era

- Baker Supercat
