= Nuthall =

Village and civil parish in Broxtowe, Nottinghamshire, England

Coordinates: 52.995°N 1.234°W

- Village and civil parish
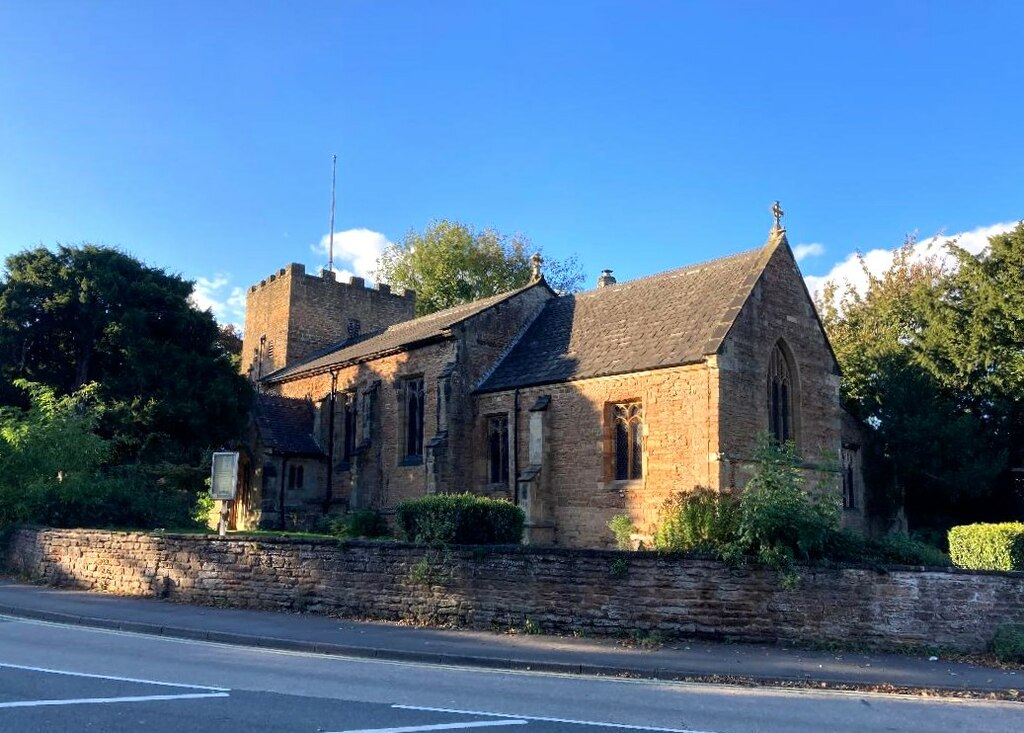
- St Patrick's Church

- Location within Nottinghamshire
- Interactive map of Nuthall
- Area: 2.1 sq mi (5.4 km^{2})
- Population: 6,583 (2021)
  - Density: 3,135/sq mi (1,210/km^{2})
- OS grid reference: SK 51407 44494
  - London: 110 mi (180 km) SSE
- District: Borough of Broxtowe
- Shire county: Nottinghamshire
- Region: East Midlands
- Country: England
- Sovereign state: United Kingdom
- Places: Mornington; Horsendale; Larkfields; Hempshill
- Post town: NOTTINGHAM
- Postcode district: NG16
- Dialling code: 0115
- Police: Nottinghamshire
- Fire: Nottinghamshire
- Ambulance: East Midlands
- UK Parliament: Nottingham North and Kimberley
- Website: www.nuthallparishcouncil.co.uk

Nuthall (/nʊtɔːl/) is a village and civil parish located in Nottinghamshire, England, neighbouring Kimberley, Watnall, Cinderhill and Basford. The population of the civil parish at the 2021 census was 6,583, an increase from 6,311 of the 2011 census. It is part of the borough of Broxtowe.

== History and geography ==
Nuthall was recorded in the Domesday Book in 1086, in the hundred of Broxtowe. Open Domesday records the settlement as having 13 households and land held by William Peverel and William son of Nigel. The first named lords of the manor after the Norman Conquest were the St Patrick family, also known as de Patrice, around 1200.

Nuthall is sometimes described locally in terms of Old Nuthall and New Nuthall. Old Nuthall lies to the north-west of the A6002 towards Kimberley, while New Nuthall lies to the south of the A6002 towards Nottingham. The Nuthall Neighbourhood Plan identifies four character areas within the parish: Mornington, Horsendale, Larkfields and Hempshill.

Mornington, to the south-east of Nuthall Island, is described as a more modern housing development accessed from Woodhouse Way via Mornington Crescent. Horsendale, also south-east of Nuthall Island and south of the A610, contains a mixture of house types and ages. Larkfields, west of Nuthall Island and bisected by the M1 motorway, includes the historic core of the village and the Nuthall Conservation Area. Hempshill, east of Nuthall Island and north of the A610, is the smallest of the four character areas, and includes Hempshill Hall, a Grade II listed building.

The historic core around Nottingham Road includes St Patrick's Church, the Old Rectory, stone-built cottages, Home Farm and surviving structures associated with the former Nuthall Temple.

=== M1 junction ===
Construction of junction 26 began in September 1964. The steel beam bridge over the A610 was built by Thomas Fletcher and Co. Ltd, of Mansfield, in 1965-66.

=== St Patrick's Church ===
The parish church of St Patrick, on Kimberley Road, is a Grade II* listed Church of England church. The building contains work from the 13th, 14th, 15th and 18th centuries, and was restored in 1838, re-roofed in 1858 and restored again in 1884, when James Fowler added a vestry and organ chamber. The Southwell and Nottingham Church History Project notes that the church is not mentioned in Domesday Book and records early documentary evidence connecting it with Lenton Priory in the early 12th century.

=== Nuthall Temple ===
Nuthall Temple was an 18th-century Palladian country house, begun in 1754 and completed in 1757 for Sir Charles Sedley, 2nd Baronet. It later became associated with the Holden family, whose papers relating to the estate are held by Manuscripts and Special Collections, The University of Nottingham. Surviving structures from the former estate include the Grade II* listed Gothic summerhouse at The Yews, Kimberley Road.

== Notable people ==
- Ronald Thomas Shepherd, Rolls-Royce chief test pilot and recipient of the OBE, lived on Highfield Road, Nuthall. He piloted the first free flight of the Rolls-Royce Thrust Measuring Rig, known as the Flying Bedstead, at nearby Hucknall Aerodrome on 3 August 1954.
- Sir Jack Drummond (1891–1952), biochemist, nutrition scientist and wartime adviser to the Ministry of Food, lived at Spencer House, Nuthall. He later became Director of Research at Boots Pure Drug Company in Nottingham.

== See also ==
- Listed buildings in Nuthall
