= Whittaker MW6 =

British ultralight aircraft

MW6
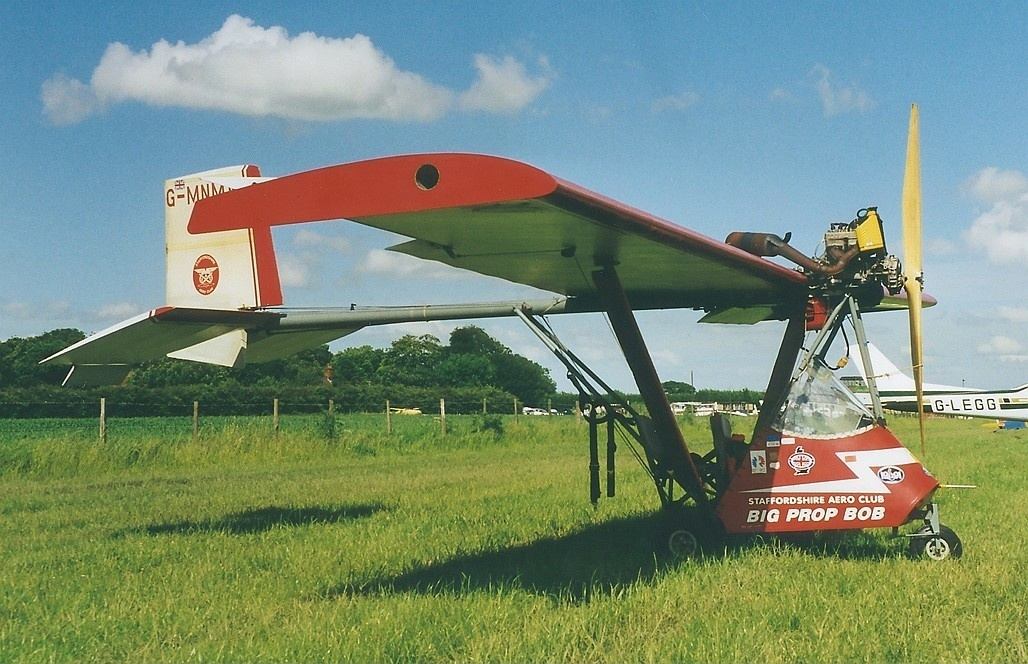
- Whittaker MW-6-1-1 Merlin

General information
- Type: Amateur-built aircraft
- National origin: United Kingdom
- Designer: Mike Whittaker
- Status: Plans available (2015)
- Number built: over 200 sets of plans sold

History
- Developed from: Whittaker MW5 Sorcerer

The Whittaker MW6 is a family of British amateur-built aircraft that was designed by Mike Whittaker and supplied as plans for amateur construction.

== Design and development ==
The MW6 series is based upon the earlier single-seat Whittaker MW5 Sorcerer. The MW6 features a strut-braced parasol wing, a two-seat open cockpit, fixed tricycle landing gear and a single engine in tractor configuration, mounted on the keel tube, above the cockpit.

The aircraft is made from aluminium tubing, with its flying surfaces covered in doped aircraft fabric. Its 9.98 m (32.7 ft) span wing has an area of 15.24 m^{2} (164.0 sq ft). The standard engine used is the 50 hp (37 kW) Rotax 503 two-stroke powerplant.

The design is Whittaker's most popular aircraft, with over 200 sets of plans sold. It is approved by the Light Aircraft Association in the UK.

== Operational history ==
Bayerl et al. said of the MW6S and MW6T, "Both are very solid and safe, though performance doesn't match the latest hotships."

== Variants ==
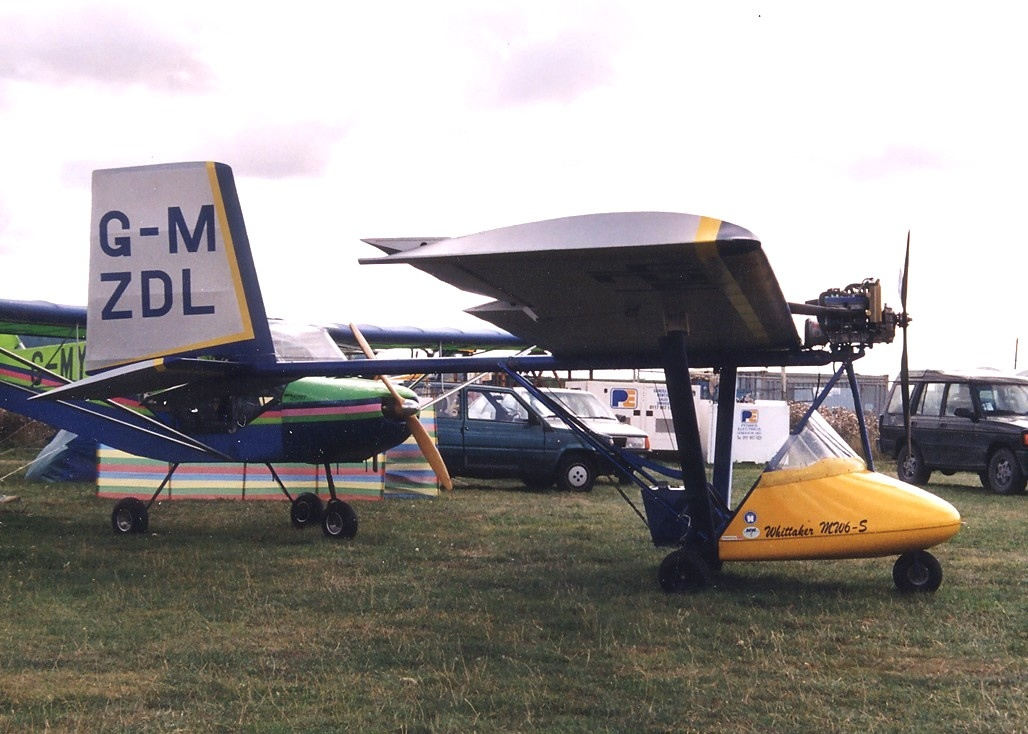
Whittaker MW6S Fatboy

MW6S Fatboy
Model with side-by-side configuration seating
MW6T Merlin
Model with tandem seating

== Specifications (MW6S Fatboy) ==
Data from Bayerl and Tacke

General characteristics

- Crew: one
- Capacity: one passenger
- Wingspan: 9.98 m (32 ft 9 in)
- Wing area: 15.24 m^{2} (164.0 sq ft)
- Empty weight: 190 kg (419 lb)
- Gross weight: 390 kg (860 lb)
- Powerplant: 1 × Rotax 503 twin cylinder, air-cooled, two stroke aircraft engine, 37 kW (50 hp)
- Propellers: 2-bladed wooden

Performance

- Maximum speed: 148 km/h (92 mph, 80 kn)
- Cruise speed: 102 km/h (63 mph, 55 kn)
- Stall speed: 56 km/h (35 mph, 30 kn)
- Rate of climb: 2.5 m/s (490 ft/min)
- Wing loading: 25.6 kg/m^{2} (5.2 lb/sq ft)
