= Whittaker MW5 Sorcerer =

British homebuilt aircraft

MW5 Sorcerer
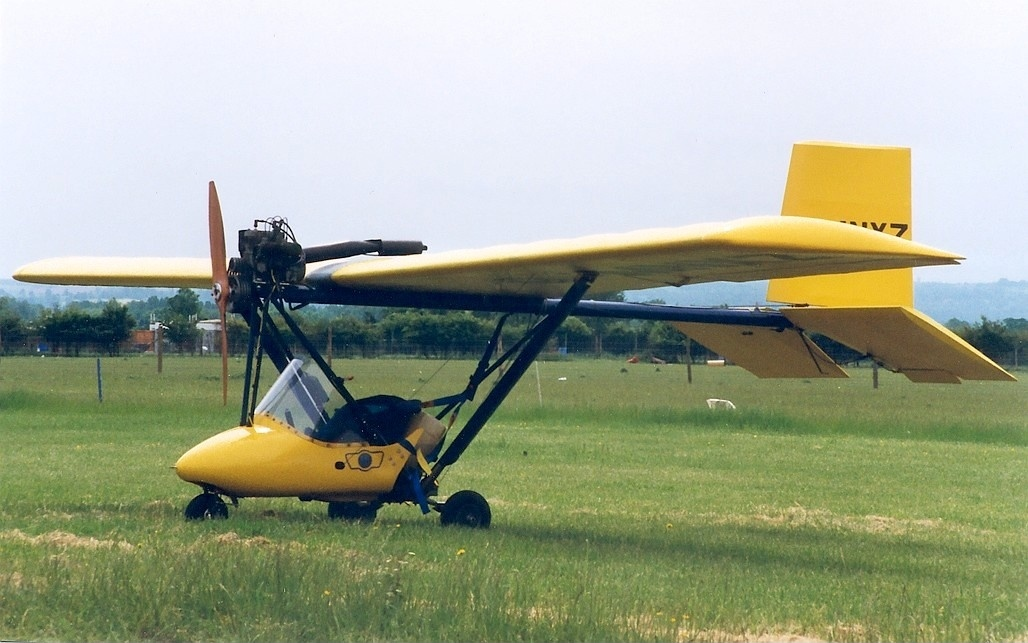
- Whittaker MW5 Sorcerer

General information
- Type: Amateur-built aircraft
- National origin: United Kingdom
- Designer: Mike Whittaker
- Status: Plans available (2015)

History
- Introduction date: mid-1980s
- Variant: Whittaker MW6

The Whittaker MW5 Sorcerer is a British amateur-built aircraft that was designed by Mike Whittaker in the mid-1980s and supplied as plans for amateur construction.

== Design and development ==
The aircraft features a strut-braced parasol wing, a single-seat open cockpit, fixed conventional landing gear and a single engine in tractor configuration, mounted on the keel tube, above the cockpit.

Whittaker MW5 Sorcerer is made from aluminium tubing, with its flying surfaces covered in doped aircraft fabric. Its 8.54 m (28.0 ft) span wing has an area of 11.2 m^{2} (121 sq ft). The standard engine used is the 40 hp (30 kW) Rotax 447 two-stroke powerplant.

The design is approved by the Light Aircraft Association in the UK.

== Variants ==
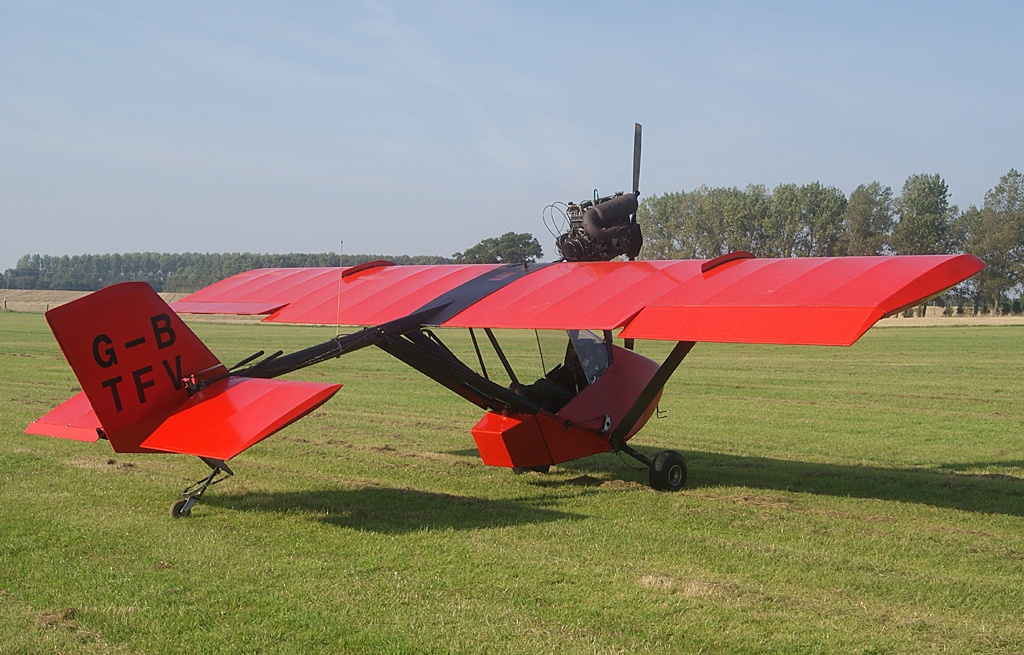
Whittaker MW-7

MW5A
Initial version
MW5D
Model with folding wings and the same wing area as the "A" model
MW5K
Seaplane version with a single monohull Full Lotus inflatable float and wing tip pontoons
MW7
Aerobatic version with shorter wingspan

== Specifications (MW5A Sorcerer) ==
Data from Bayerl and Tacke

General characteristics

- Crew: one
- Wingspan: 8.54 m (28 ft 0 in)
- Wing area: 11.2 m^{2} (121 sq ft)
- Empty weight: 145 kg (320 lb)
- Gross weight: 285 kg (628 lb)
- Powerplant: 1 × Rotax 447 twin cylinder, air-cooled, two stroke aircraft engine, 30 kW (40 hp)
- Propellers: 2-bladed wooden

Performance

- Maximum speed: 148 km/h (92 mph, 80 kn)
- Cruise speed: 102 km/h (63 mph, 55 kn)
- Stall speed: 56 km/h (35 mph, 30 kn)
- Rate of climb: 3 m/s (590 ft/min)
- Wing loading: 25.4 kg/m^{2} (5.2 lb/sq ft)
