= Timeline of jet power =

This article outlines the important developments in the history of the development of the air-breathing (duct) jet engine. Although the most common type, the gas turbine powered jet engine, was certainly a 20th-century invention, many of the needed advances in theory and technology leading to this invention were made well before this time.

The jet engine was clearly an idea whose time had come. Frank Whittle submitted his first patent in 1930. By the late 1930s there were six teams chasing development, three in Germany, two in the UK and one in Hungary. By 1942 they had been joined by another half dozen British companies, three more in the United States based on British technology, and early efforts in the Soviet Union and Japan based on British and German designs respectively. For some time after the World War II, British designs dominated, but by the 1950s there were many competitors, particularly in the US with its huge arms-buying programme.

== Prehistoric times ==
- Ordovician period: the first known cephalopods: they swim by a natural built-in reciprocating hydrojet.

== Ancient times ==
- 1st century AD: Aeolipile described by Hero of Alexandria – steam jet/rocket engine on a bearing

== The leadup (1791–1929) ==
- 1791: John Barber receives British patent #1833 for A Method for Rising Inflammable Air for the Purposes of Producing Motion and Facilitating Metallurgical Operations. In the patent he describes a gas turbine and various applications for it including propulsion of ships, barges and boats by reaction.
- 1884: Charles Algernon Parsons patents the steam turbine. In the patent application he notes that the turbine could be driven "in reverse" to act as a compressor. He suggests using a compressor to feed air into a furnace, and a turbine to extract power to run the compressor. Although intended for factory use, he is clearly describing the gas turbine.
- 1887: Gustaf de Laval introduces nozzles design of small steam turbines.
- 1900: Sanford Alexander Moss publishes a paper on turbocompressors. He builds and runs a testbed example in 1903.
- 1903: Ægidius Elling builds a gas turbine using a centrifugal compressor which runs under its own power. By most definitions, this is the first working gas turbine.
- 1906: The Armengaud-Lemale gas turbine tested in France. This was a relatively large machine which included a 25 stage centrifugal compressor designed by Auguste Rateau. The gas turbine could sustain its own air compression but was too inefficient to produce useful work.
- 1907: Victor Kavarodine builds the first pulsejet engine based on his 1906 patent.
- 1908: René Lorin patents a design for the ramjet engine.
- 1908: Georges Marconnet patents the first valveless pulsejet and suggests its use in aircraft.
- 1910: Romanian inventor Henri Coandă builds the Coandă-1910 which he exhibits at the International Aeronautic Salon in Paris. It uses a ducted fan for propulsion instead of a propeller. Years later he claimed that it burned fuel in the duct and was thus a motorjet, but historians debate this claim, and his claims that the aircraft flew in December 1910 before crashing and burning.
- 1915: Albert Fonó devised a solution for increasing the range of artillery, comprising a gun-launched projectile which was to be united with a ramjet propulsion unit. This was to make it possible to obtain a long range with low initial muzzle velocities, allowing heavy shells to be fired from relatively lightweight guns.
- 1916: Auguste Rateau suggests using exhaust-powered compressors to improve high-altitude performance, the first example of the turbocharger.
- 1917: Sanford Alexander Moss starts work on turbochargers at General Electric, which goes on to be the world leader in this technology.
- 1917: James Stocker Harris patents a "Motor Jet" design on behalf of his brother inlaw Robert Alexander Raveau Bolton.
- 1920: W.J. Stern reports to the Royal Air Force that there is no future for the turbine engine in aircraft. He bases his argument on the extremely low efficiency of existing compressor designs. Stern's paper is so convincing there is little official interest in gas turbine engines anywhere, although this does not last long.
- 1921: Maxime Guillaume patents the axial-flow turbine engine. It uses multiple stages in both the compressor and turbine, combined with a single very large combustion chamber. Although sightly different in form, the design is significantly similar to future jet engines in operation.
- 1923: Edgar Buckingham at the United States National Bureau of Standards publishes a report on jets, coming to the same conclusion as W.J. Stern, that the turbine engine is not efficient enough. In particular he notes that a jet would use five times as much fuel as a piston engine.
- 1926: Alan Arnold Griffith publishes his groundbreaking paper Aerodynamic Theory of Turbine Design, changing the low confidence in jet engines. In it he demonstrates that existing compressors are "flying stalled", and that major improvements can be made by redesigning the blades from a flat profile into an airfoil, going on to mathematically demonstrate that a practical engine is definitely possible and showing how to build a turboprop.
- 1927: Aurel Stodola publishes his "Steam and Gas Turbines" - basic reference for jet propulsion engineers in the USA.
- 1927: A testbed single-shaft turbocompressor based on Griffith's blade design is tested at the Royal Aircraft Establishment. Known as Anne, the tests are successful and plans are made to build a complete compressor-turbine assembly known as Betty.
- 1929: Frank Whittle's thesis on future aircraft design is published. In it he talks about the needs for high-speed flight and the use of turbojets as the only reasonable solution to the problem of propeller efficiency.
- 1929: Boris Stechkin publishes first theory of supersonic ramjet, based on compressible fluid theory.

== First turbojet engines (1930–38) ==
- 1930: Whittle presents a complete jet engine design to the Air Ministry. They pass the paper to Alan Griffith at the Royal Aircraft Establishment, who says the idea is impracticable, pointing out a mathematical error, noting the low efficiency of his design, and stating that Whittle's use of a centrifugal compressor would make his proposal useless for aircraft applications.
- 1930: Whittle receives official notice that the Air Ministry is not interested in his concepts, and that they do not even feel that it is worthy of making secret. He is devastated, but friends in the Royal Air Force convince him to patent the idea anyway. This turns out to be a major stroke of luck, because if the Air Ministry had made the idea secret, they would have become the official owners of the rights to the concept. In his patent, Whittle cleverly hedges his bets, and describes an engine with two axial compressor stages and one centrifugal, thus anticipating both routes forward.
- 1930: Schmidt patents a pulsejet engine in Germany.
- 1931: Secondo Campini patents his motorjet engine, referring to it as a thermojet. (A motorjet is a crude form of hybrid jet engine in which the compressor is powered by a piston engine, rather than a turbine.)
- 1933: Hans von Ohain writes his thesis at the University of Göttingen, describing an engine similar to Frank Whittle's with the exception that it uses a centrifugal "fan" as the turbine as well as the compressor. This design is a dead-end; no "centrifugal-turbine" jet engine will ever be built.
- 1933: Yuri Pobedonostsev and Igor Merkulov tests hydrogen powered GIRD-04 ramjet engine. First supersonic flight of a jet propelled object achieved with artillery-launched ramjets later that year.
- 1934: von Ohain hires a local mechanic, Max Hahn, to build his a prototype of his engine design at Hahn's garage.
- 1934: Secondo Campini starts work on the Campini Caproni CC.2, based on his "thermojet" engine.
- 1935: Whittle allows his patent to lapse after finding himself unable to pay the £5 renewal fee. Soon afterward he is approached by ex-RAF officers Rolf Dudley-Williams and James Collingwood Tinling with a proposal to set up a company to develop his design and Power Jets, Ltd is created.
- 1935 Virgilio Leret Ruiz is granted a patent (submitted January 1935, granted March 1935) in Madrid for a 'continuous reaction turbocompressor, for propulsion of aircraft, and in general all types of vehicles'. Work commenced at the Hispano-Suiza factory in 1936, months after Leret's execution by Francoist forces.
- 1936: von Ohain is introduced to Ernst Heinkel by a former professor. After being grilled by Heinkel engineers for hours, they conclude his idea is genuine. Heinkel hires von Ohain and Hahn, setting them up at their Rostock-area factory.
- 1936: Junkers starts work on axial-flow turboprop designs under the direction of Herbert Wagner and Adolf Müeller.
- 1936: Junkers Motoren (Jumo) is merged with Junkers, formerly separate companies.
- 1936: French engineer René Leduc, having independently re-discovered René Lorin's design, successfully demonstrates the world's first operating ramjet. The Armée de l'Air orders a prototype aircraft, the Leduc 0.10, a few months later.
- April, 1937: Whittle's experimental centrifugal engine is tested at the British Thomson-Houston plant in Rugby
- September, 1937: The Heinkel HeS 1 experimental hydrogen fuelled centrifugal engine is tested at Hirth.
- September, 1937: von Ohain's Heinkel HeS 1 is converted to run on gasoline. Ernst Heinkel gives the go-ahead to develop a flight-quality engine and a testbed aircraft to put it in.
- 1937: Hayne Constant, Griffith's partner at the RAE, starts negotiations with Metropolitan-Vickers (Metrovick), a British heavy industry firm, to develop a Griffith-style turboprop.
- 1937: At Junkers, Wagner and Müller decide to re-design their work as a pure jet.
- 1938: Metrovick receives a contract from the Air Ministry to start work with Constant.
- 1938: György Jendrassik starts work on a turboprop engine of his own design.
- April, 1938: Hans Mauch takes over the RLM rocket development office. He expands the charter of his office and starts a massive jet development project, under Helmut Schelp. Mauch spurns Heinkel and Junkers, concentrating only on the "big four" engine companies, Daimler-Benz, BMW, Jumo and Bramo. Mauch and Schelp visit all four over the next few months, and find them uninterested in the jet concept.
- 1938: A small team at BMW led by Hermann Östrich builds and flies a simple thermojet quickly prompting them to design a true jet engine.
- 1938: The Heinkel He 178 V1 jet testbed is completed, awaiting an engine.
- 1938: The Heinkel HeS 3 "flight quality" engine is tested. This is the first truly usable jet engine. The engine flies on a Heinkel He 118 later that year, eventually becoming the first aircraft to be powered by jet power alone. This engine is tested until it burns out after a few months, and a second is readied for flight.
- 1938: Wagner's axial-flow engine is tested at Junkers.
- 1938: Messerschmitt starts the preliminary design of a twin-engine jet fighter under the direction of Waldemar Voight. This work developed into the Messerschmitt Me 262.

== 1939, Flight ==
- Arkhip Mikhailovich Lyulka develops early turbofan engine at Kharkov Aviation Institute.
- BMW's team led by Hermann Östrich tests their axial-flow design.
- Bramo starts work on two axial-flow designs, the P.3301 and P.3302. The P.3301 is similar to Griffith's contrarotating designs, the P.3302 using a simpler compressor/stator system.
- Bramo is bought out by BMW, who abandon their own jet project under Östrich, placing him in charge of Bramo's efforts.
- Summer: Jumo is awarded a contract to develop an axial-flow engine, starting work under Anselm Franz. Müller decamps with half the team to Heinkel.
- Frank Whittle's patent drawing for his engine is published in the German magazine Flugsport.

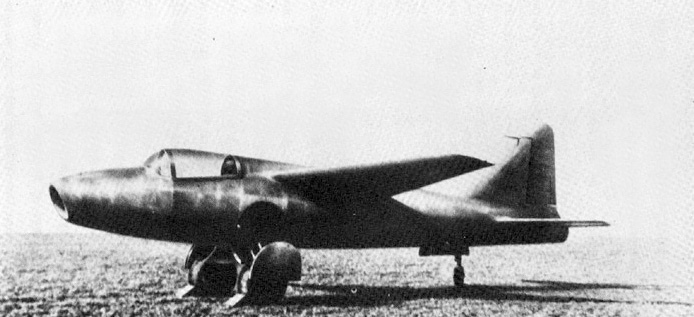
Heinkel He 178, the world's first aircraft to fly purely on turbojet power

- August: Heinkel He 178 V1, the first jet-powered aircraft, flies for the first time, powered by the HeS 3B.
- September: A team from the Air Ministry visits Power Jets once again, but this time Frank Whittle demonstrates a jet engine at full power for a continuous 20-minute run. They are extremely impressed, quickly contracts are offered to Whittle to develop a flyable design, and production contracts are offered to practically every engine company in England. These companies also set up their own design efforts, reducing the possibility of financial rewards for Power Jets.
- September: The Air Ministry also contracts Gloster to build an experimental airframe for testing Whittle's engines, the Gloster E.28/39
- After hearing of Whittle's successful demonstration, Hayne Constant realizes that exhaust thrust is practical. The Metrovick efforts are quickly reworked into a turbojet design, the Metrovick F.2.
- November: Müller's team restarts work on their axial-flow design at Heinkel, now known as the Heinkel HeS 30.
- René Anxionnaz of France's Rateau company received a patent on an advanced jet design incorporating bypass.
- Leist joins Daimler-Benz and starts work on an advanced contra-rotating turbofan design, the Daimler-Benz DB 007
- A shakeup at the RLM's engine division places Helmut Schelp in control, and results in development contracts for all existing engine designs. The designs are also given consistent naming, the Heinkel HeS 8 becoming the 109-001, the HeS 30 the -006, BMW's efforts the -002 and -003, and Jumo's the -004. Porsche's project becomes the -005, although work never starts on it. DB gets -007. Numbers starting in the 20s are saved for turboprops, and 500 and up for rockets.

== 1940 ==
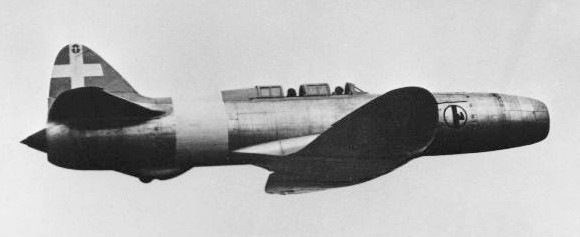
The CC.2, the first publicly demonstrated jet aircraft.

- The Campini Caproni CC.2 flies for first time. The flights were highly publicized, and for many years the Italians were credited with having the first jet-powered aircraft.
- NACA (National Advisory Committee for Aeronautics) starts work on a CC.2 like motorjet for assisted takeoffs, and they later design an aircraft based on it. This work ends in 1943 when turbojets start to mature, and rockets take over the role of JATO, or jet assisted takeoff.
- von Ohain's larger Heinkel HeS 8 (-001) engine is tested.
- BMW's P.3302 (-003) axial-flow engine is tested
- September: Glider testing of the Heinkel He 280 twin-jet fighter begins, while it waits for the HeS 8 to mature.
- September: Henry Tizard visits the United States to show them many of the advanced technologies the British are working on and looking for US production (the Tizard Mission). Among many other details, Tizard first mentions their work on jet engines.
- October: Rover is selected to build the flight-quality Power Jets W.1. They set up shop at a disused mill in Barnoldswick, but also set up a parallel effort at another factory in Clitheroe staffed entirely by their own engineers. Frank Whittle is incensed.
- November: The Junkers Jumo 004 axial-flow engine is tested.
- November: Gloster Aircraft Company's proposal for a twin-engine jet fighter is accepted, becoming the Gloster Meteor.
- December: Whittle's flight-quality W.1X runs for the first time.
- The Lockheed Corporation starts work on the L-1000 axial-flow engine, the United States's first jet design.
- The Northrop Corporation starts work on the T-37 Turbodyne, the United States's first turboprop design.
- After only two years of development, the Jendrassik Cs-1 turboprop engine is tested. Designed to produce 1,000 horsepower (750 kW), combustion problems limit it to only 400 horsepower (300 kW) when it first runs. Similar problems plagued early Whittle designs, but the industry quickly provided assistance. It appears that György Jendrassik had to draw upon any similar talent pool.

== 1942 ==
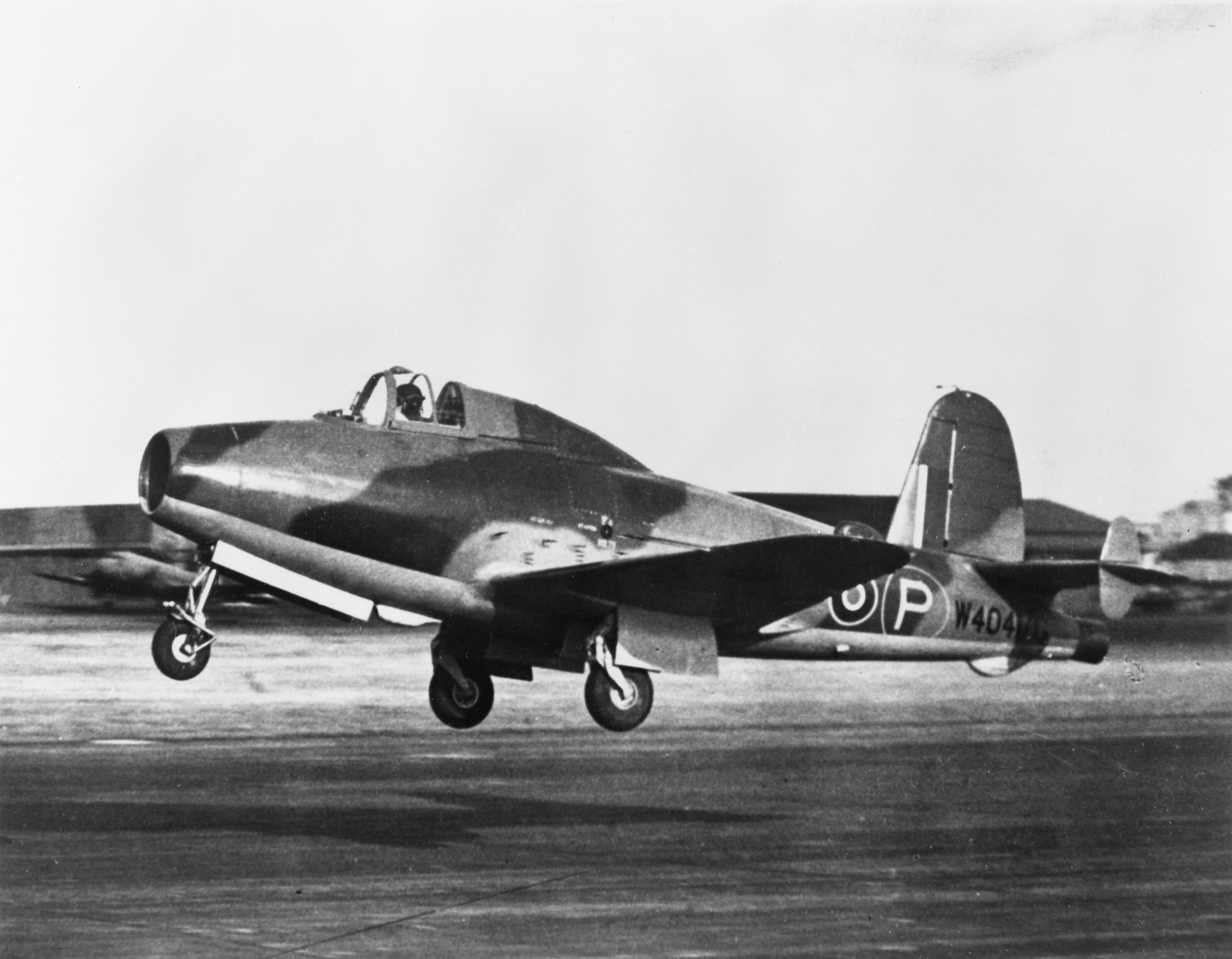
The E.28/39 flies for the first time in 1942.

- February: The Air Ministry places an order for 12 Gloster Meteor.
- February: NACA starts testing their "Propulsive duct engine", a ramjet, unaware of earlier similar efforts. Since ramjets need to be moving in order to work, NACA engineers take the simple step of mounting it at the end of a long arm and spinning it.
- April: The He 280 flies under its own power for first time, powered by two Heinkel HeS 7 (-001) engines. The HeS 8's continue to have reliability issues.
- May: The Gloster E.28/39 flies for the first time. Over the next few weeks, the top speed soon passes any existing propeller aircraft.
- Müller's Heinkel HeS 29 (-006) axial-flow engine runs for first time.
- General Electric is awarded a USAAF contract to develop a turboprop engine, leading to the TG-100 / TG-31 / XT-31 series, and later the J35.
- Work on the Jendrassik Cs-1 ends. Intended to power a twin-engine heavy fighter, the factory is selected to produce Daimler-Benz DB 605 engines under license for the Messerschmitt Me 210 instead.
- October: A Power Jets W.2B is sent to General Electric to start production in the US. Sanford Alexander Moss is lured out of retirement to help on the project.

== 1943 ==
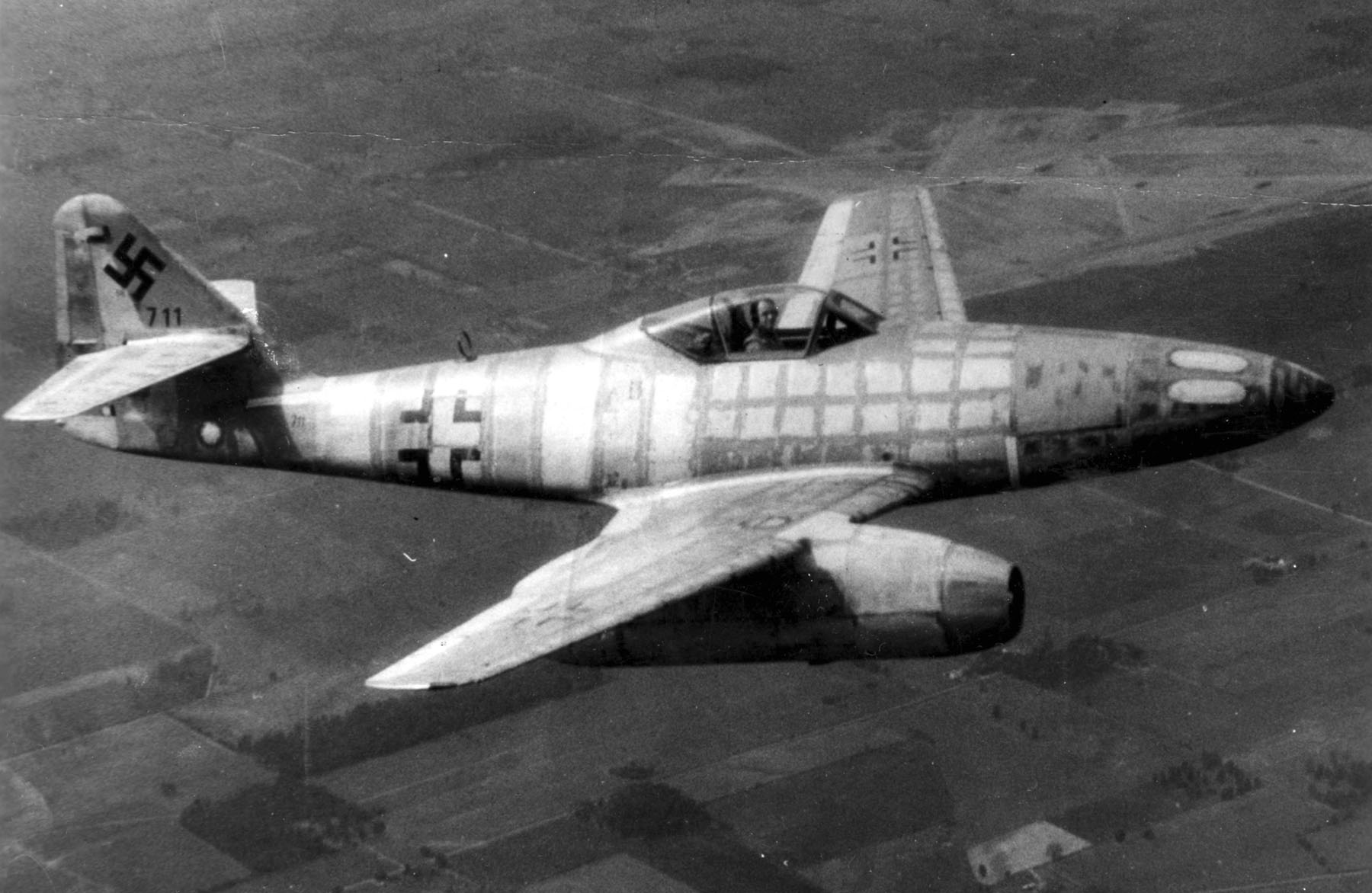
The Me 262 flies for the first time in 1942, and would go on to become the first jet powered combat aircraft to enter service.

- The Metrovick F.2 is given test rating delivering between 1,800 and 2,000 lbf (8.9 kN)
- Metrovick start on "thrust augmentation" adding a turbine and propellers to a F2/2 which will lead to the F.3 (a high bypass design) with an extra 1,600 lbf (7,100 N) over the F2/2.
- Work on the BMW 002 is stopped as it is proving too complex. Work continues on the 003.
- Work on the HeS 8 (-001) and HeS 30 (-006) is stopped, although the later appears to be reaching production quality. Heinkel is ordered to continue on the more advanced Heinkel HeS 011.
- The Messerschmitt Me 262 flies for the first time, powered by a Junkers Jumo 211 piston engine in the nose. The BMW 003 has been selected to power the production versions, but is not yet ready for flight tests. The design, offering more internal fuel capacity than the He 280, is selected over its now 003-powered competitor for production.
- A Jumo 004 flies, fitted to a Messerschmitt Me 110
- The Daimler-Benz 007 axial-flow engine is tested, similar to Griffith's "contraflow" design that uses two contra-rotating compressor stages for added efficiency.
- The "production-quality" BMW 003 is first tested.
- March. The Rover W2B/26 experimental engine (STX) is first run, this was the straight-through design made by Rover without the knowledge of Whittle. This design was to be adopted by Rolls-Royce as the basis for their Derwent engine after they took over from Rover (by which time four more W2B/26 engines were under test).
- The British order a single-engined jet design from de Havilland
- July 18, 1942: The Messerschmitt Me 262, the first jet-powered fighter aircraft, flies for the first time under jet power.
- July: Frank Whittle visits the United States to help with General Electric's efforts to build the W.1. The engine is running soon after, known as the "General Electric Type 1", and later as the I-16, referring to the 1,600 lbf (7,100 N) thrust. They also start work on an improved version, the I-40, with 4,000 lbf (18 kN) thrust. The majority of United States jet engines from this time through the mid-1950s are licensed versions of British designs.
- Whittle returns to Power Jets and starts development of the improved Power Jets W.2/500 and /700 engines, so named for their thrust in kilograms-force (kgf).
- Westinghouse starts work on an axial-flow engine design, the WE-19.
- October: The Bell XP-59 flies, powered by a General Electric Type I-A (W.1).
- The Fieseler Fi 103 V-1 pulsejet powered "flying bomb" (cruise missile) flies for the first time.
- Armstrong Siddeley starts work on an axial-flow design, the ASX.
- December: After meeting held at a pub, Rover agrees to hand over the jet development to Rolls-Royce, in exchange for their Rolls-Royce Meteor tank engine factory.

== 1943 ==
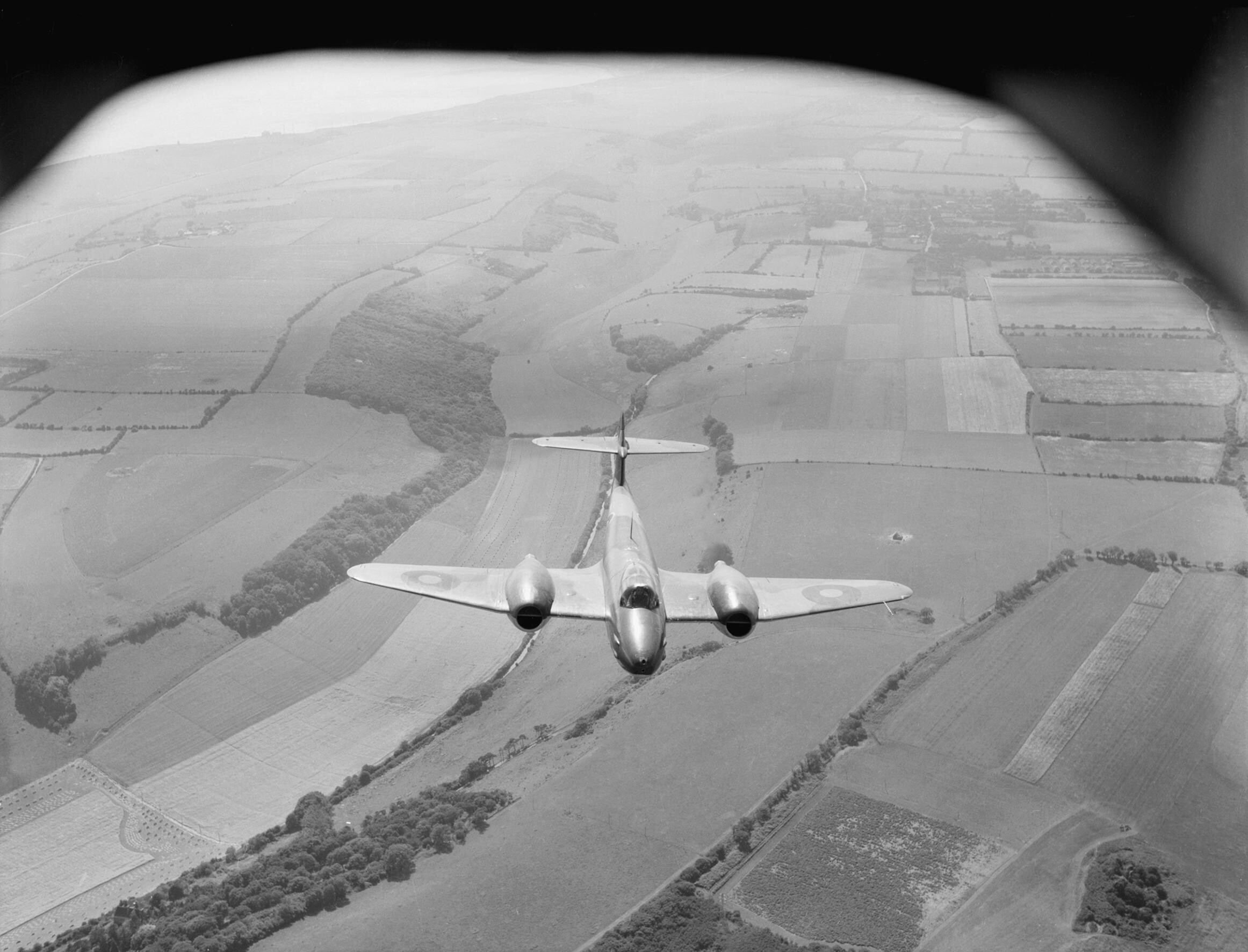
The Meteor flew in 1943, a year later than the 262, but entered service only a month later.

- January 1: Rolls takes over the Rover plants, although the official date is several months later. Stanley Hooker leads a team including Fred Morley, Arthur Rubbra and Harry Pearson. Several Rover engineers decide to stay on as well, including Adrian Lombard, leader of Rover's "offshoot" design team. They focus on making the W.2B production quality as soon as possible.
- After only a few short months since Rolls-Royce took over from Rover, the W.2B/23, soon to be known as the Rolls-Royce Welland, starts production.
- The parallel Rover design effort, the W.2B/26, is adopted by Rolls-Royce for further development and becomes the Rolls-Royce Derwent.
- The de Havilland Goblin engine is tested, similar in most ways to the Derwent.
- March: A license for the Goblin is taken out in the United States by Allis-Chalmers, later becoming the J36. Lockheed is awarded a contract to develop what would become the P-80 Shooting Star, powered by this engine.
- Production of Jumo 004B starts.
- Production of BMW 003A starts.
- First running turbofan the German Daimler-Benz DB 670 (a.k.a. 109-007) operated on its testbed on April 1, 1943
- Throughout 1943, the Jumo 004 and BMW 003 continue to destroy themselves at an alarming rate due to turbine failures. Efforts in the United Kingdom, at one point years behind due to official indifference, have now caught up due to the availability of high temperature alloys which allowed for considerably more reliable high-heat sections of their designs.
- Design work on the BMW 018 starts.
- The US decides to rename all existing jet projects with a single numbering scheme. The L-1000 becomes the J37, GE's Type I the J31, and Westinghouse's WE-19 the J30. Newer projects are fitted into the remaining "30's". Turboprop designs become the T series, also starting at 30.
- June: Metrovick F.2/1 tested, fitted to Avro Lancaster
- September: Allis-Chalmers runs into difficulty on the J36, and the Shooting Star project is re-engined with the General Electric J33, a licensed version of the W.2B/26, or Rolls-Royce Derwent. GE later modifies the design to produce over twice the thrust, at 4,000 lbf (18 kN).
- Frank Whittle's W.2B/700 engine is tested, fitted to a Vickers Wellington Mk II bomber.
- March: Westinghouse's X19A axial-flow engine is bench tested at 1,165 lbf (5,180 N).
- Miles Aircraft test an all-moving tailplane as part of the Miles M.52 supersonic research aircraft design effort.
- A Welland-powered prototype Gloster Meteor flies.
- The Goblin-powered de Havilland Vampire flies.
- Lyul'ka VDR-2 axial-flow engine tested, the first Soviet jet design.
- The General Electric J31, their version of the W.2B/23, is tested.
- November: The Metrovick F.2 is tested on a modified Gloster Meteor. Although more powerful, smaller and more fuel efficient than the Welland, the design is judged too complex and failure prone. In his quest for perfection, Griffith instead delivers an impractical design. Work continues on a larger version with an additional compressor stage that over doubles the power.
- The Armstrong Siddeley ASX is tested.
- Metrovick F2/3 delivers 2,700 lbf (12,000 N) but not developed further, moving on to 10 stage F2/4

== 1944 ==
- BMW tests the 003R, a 003 with an additional rocket engine mounted "in parallel" to the BMW 003A turbojet it is combined with; and produces an even more powerful "mixed-power" engine.
- April: With internal design efforts underway at most engine companies, Power Jets have little possibility of profitability, and are nationalized, becoming a pure research lab as the National Gas Turbine Establishment.
- June: Design work on a gas turbine engine for powering tanks begins under the direction of Müller, who left Heinkel in 1942. The first such system, the GT 101, is completed in November and fit to a Panther tank for testing.
- June: A Derwent II engine is modified with an additional turbine stage powering a gearbox and five-bladed propeller. The resulting RB.50, or Rolls-Royce Trent, is not further developed, but is test flown on a modified Gloster Meteor.
- The Junkers Ju 287 jet bomber is tested.
- The BMW 018 engine is tested. Work ends soon after when the entire tooling and parts supply are destroyed in a bombing raid.
- The Junkers Jumo 012 engine is tested, it stands as the most powerful engine in the world for some time, at 6,600 lbf (29,000 N).
- The J35, a development of an earlier turboprop effort, runs for the first time.
- Ford builds a copy of the V-1's engine, known as the PJ-31-1.
- The Ishikawajima Ne-20 first runs in Japan. Originally intending to build a direct copy of the BMW 003, the plans never arrived and the Japanese engineers instead built an entirely new design based on a single cutaway image and several photographs.
- The Doblhof WNF-4 flies, the first ramjet-powered helicopter.
- April 5: The nearly complete prototype of the Leduc 0.10 ramjet-powered aircraft, under construction at the Montaudran airfield near Toulouse, France, unbeknownst to German occupation authorities, is heavily damaged by a Royal Air Force bombing raid.
- April: The Messerschmitt Me 262 first enters combat service Germany.
- June: The Messerschmitt Me 262 enters squadron service in Germany.
- July: The Gloster Meteor enters squadron service in the United Kingdom.
- 27 July: First combat mission flown by a Gloster Meteor
- 4 August: Gloster Meteors shot down two pulsejet-powered V-1 flying bombs
- A design competition starts in Germany to build a simple jet fighter, the Volksjäger. The contract is eventually won by the Heinkel He 162 Spatz (sparrow), to be powered by the BMW 003.
- October 27 - After a short 6-month period Rolls-Royce designs and builds the Rolls-Royce Nene at 5,000 lbf (22 kN), but it sees only limited use in the United Kingdom, and is first run on this date.
- December: Northrop's T-37 turboprop is tested. The design never matures and work is later stopped in the late 1940s.

== 1945 ==
- The Nakajima Kikka flies for the first time on August 7, 1945, powered by two Ishikawajima Ne-20 turbojets, making it the first Japanese jet aircraft to fly.
- Stanley Hooker scales the Nene down to Gloster Meteor size, producing the RB.37, also referred to, confusingly, as the Derwent V. A Derwent V powered Meteor sets the world speed record at 606 mph at the end of the year. The importance of this incident relegates the development of more powerful engines unimportant.
- The Junkers 022 turboprop runs.
- An afterburner equipped Jumo 004 is tested.
- Lyul'ka VDR-3 axial-flow engine tested.
- Lyul'ka TR-1 axial-flow engine tested.
- The RB.39 Rolls-Royce Clyde turboprop runs, combining axial and centrifugal stages in the compressor. Rolls-Royce abandon development, preferring to focus on the turbojet. A carrier-based naval strike aircraft, the Westland Wyvern, having already changed from its original Rolls-Royce Eagle piston engine, uses the alternative turboprop, the Armstrong Siddeley Python.
- The Avia S-92, a version of the Me 262, is built in Czechoslovakia.

== 1946 ==
- January: A dispirited Frank Whittle resigns from what is left of Power Jets. Gradually the company is broken up, with only a small part remaining to administer its patents.
- Development of the Rolls-Royce Dart starts. The Dart would go on to become one of the most popular turboprop engines made, with over 7,000 being produced before the production lines finally shut down in 1990.
- Metrovick F2/4 Beryl delivers 4,000 lbf (17.8 kN). Metrovick jet turbines sold to Armstrong Siddeley.

== 1949 ==
- April 21: The Leduc 0.10, the world's first ramjet powered aircraft, finally completes its maiden flight in Toulouse, France. The aircraft's rate of climb exceeds that of the best contemporary turbojet powered fighters.
- 22 June: Vickers VC.1 Viking flew with Rolls-Royce Nene turbojets: the world's first pure jet transport aircraft.

== 1950 ==
- late 1950: Rolls-Royce Conway the world's first production turbofan enters service, significantly improving fuel efficiency and paving the way for further improvements.

== 1952 ==
- 2 January: the world's first flight of a geared turbofan, the Turbomeca Aspin, powering the Fouga Gemeaux test-bed aircraft.
- 2 May: the world's first commercial jet airliner to reach production, the de Havilland Comet, enters service with BOAC.

== 1953 ==
- The de Havilland Gyron, Halford's last jet design, runs for the first time. Before cancellation 2 years later it has evolved to 25,000 lbf (110,000 N) using reheat. Other comparable turbojet engines are developed at the same time including the Canadian Orenda Iroquois.

== 1956 ==
- 15 September: the Tu-104 medium range jet airliner enters service with Aeroflot, the world's first jet airliner to provide a sustained and successful service. The Tu-104 was the sole jetliner operating in the world between 1956 and 1958.

== 1958 ==
- October: the Boeing 707 enters service with Pan American. This aeroplane is largely credited with ushering in the Jet Age having huge commercial success with few operating problems unlike its competitors. This plane helped establish Boeing as one of the leading makers of passenger aircraft in the world.

== 1959 ==
- Sud Aviation Caravelle enters service: claimed as the first short/medium range jet airliner, first flight 27 May 1955.

== 1968 ==
- 30 June: TF39 high bypass turbofan of 43,300 lbf (193 kN) enters service on the C-5 Galaxy transport ushering in the age of wide-body transports.

== 1975 ==
- 26 December 1975: Tu-144S the first supersonic jet airliner went into mail and freight service between Moscow and Alma-Ata in preparation for passenger services, which commenced November 1977.

== 1976 ==
- 21 January: Concorde, the supersonic jet airliner, enters passenger service with British Airways and Air France.

== 1978 ==
- 1 June: Tu-144 withdrawn from scheduled passenger service after 55 passenger flights due to reliability and safety problems.

== 1983 ==
- 4 October 1983: Thrust2 turbojet-powered car gets the land speed record to 1149 km/h.

== 1997 ==
- 15 October 1997: ThrustSSC first supersonic car, powered by two turbofans takes the land speed record to 1,228 km/h.

== 2002 ==
- HyShot scramjet ignited and operated.

== 2003 ==
- 31 January - GE90-115B receives FAR 33 certification; currently holds the world record for thrust and engine (fan) size for a gas turbine powered engine at 127,900 lb_{f} of thrust and 128 inches, respectively
- 26 November: Concorde retires from service

== 2004 ==
- Hyper-X first scramjet to maintain altitude

== 2007 ==
- Hyper-X first airbreathing (scram)jet to attain Mach 10

== See also ==
- Timeline of rocket and missile technology
- Jet engine
