= Anselm Franz =

Austrian-American engineer (1900–1994)

- Born: Anselm Franz; January 21, 1900; Schladming, Austro-Hungarian Empire
- Died: November 18, 1994 (aged 94); Bridgeport, Connecticut, U.S.
- Education: Graz University of Technology (BS); University of Berlin (PhD)
- Occupation: Jet engine engineer

Anselm Franz (January 21, 1900—November 18, 1994) was a Austrian-American jet engine engineer known for the development of the Jumo 004, the world's first mass-produced turbojet engine by Nazi Germany during World War II, and his work on turboshaft designs in the United States after the war as part of Operation Paperclip, including the Lycoming T53, the Honeywell T55, the AGT-1500, and the PLF1A-2, the world's first high-bypass turbofan engine.

== Early life ==
Born in Schladming, Austria, in 1900, Franz studied mechanical engineering at the Graz University of Technology and earned a doctoral degree from the University of Berlin. Franz worked as a design engineer at a company in Berlin, where he developed hydraulic torque converters. In 1933 Franz joined the Sturmabteilung.

== Junkers Aircraft ==
In 1936, he joined Junkers, and during much of the 1930s he was in charge of supercharger and turbocharger development.

Meanwhile Hans von Ohain's first jet engines were being run at Heinkel, although there was little official interest. Helmut Schelp and Hans Mauch, at the Reichsluftfahrtministerium (RLM), tried to keep development moving through the "back door" by attempting to interest existing engine companies in jet development. On one such visit in early 1939 Otto Mader at Junkers said that even if the idea was worth looking at, he had no one to run such an effort. Schelp suggested that Franz would be perfect for the job, given his experience in turbocompressor work.

The program was set up later in 1939, initially consisting of a very small team drawn from the supercharger division. Unlike the Heinkel designs, the Jumo would use an axial compressor, as opposed to the centrifugal compressor, in order to have a smaller frontal area. With that exception the design was otherwise very conservative, a series of six flame cans were used for combustion instead of a single annular burner, and the compression ratio was kept low at 3.14:1. Franz decided to focus on development time-to-market instead of performance in order to avoid having the program killed off if it didn't produce a working engine quickly.

The first testbed run of the experimental 004A took place in the spring of 1940, and had full speed runs in January 1941. The engine flew on an Messerschmitt Bf 110 on March 15, 1942, and after a number of these A models were delivered, the Messerschmitt Me 262 first took to the air with the 004A on July 18. The RLM was finally interested in the design, and ordered 80 production quality versions. The new 004B version included a number of changes, but ran into difficulty with vibration and fatigue problems that greatly delayed its service entry. It was not until the spring of 1944 that the engine was routinely lasting 50 hours and could enter full production. It nevertheless went on to power the majority of the Luftwaffe's jet designs.

== Operation Paperclip ==
After the war Franz moved to the United States as part of Operation Paperclip, and worked for a time with the USAF on engine-related issues at Wright-Patterson Air Force Base. He was known to still wear his long leather, military coat from Nazi Germany in the United States, with the Nazi insignia removed.

In 1951 he was hired to set up a new turbine division at Lycoming's otherwise unused plant in Stratford, Connecticut. Here he decided to focus on engine areas not currently served by the larger companies (General Electric and Pratt & Whitney), eventually settling on helicopter engines. His first design, the T53, would go on to be one of the most popular turboshaft engines in history, powering the Bell Aircraft UH-1 Huey and AH-1 Cobra helicopters, and the OV-1 Mohawk ground attack aircraft. He followed this success with the larger T55, later converting it into a small turbofan engine as well. In the 1960s he led development of a new design for tank use, which developed into the AGT-1500, used on the M1 Abrams.

== Retirement ==
Franz retired from Lycoming in 1968, having risen to vice president and assistant general manager. He died in 1994, holder of the U.S. Army Outstanding Civilian Service Medal, the R. Tom Sawyer Award from the American Society of Mechanical Engineers, the Austrian Decoration of Honour for Science and Art, and the Grand Decoration of Honour in Gold with Star for Services to the Republic of Austria.
