= Heinkel HeS 8 =

Jet engine

HeS 8
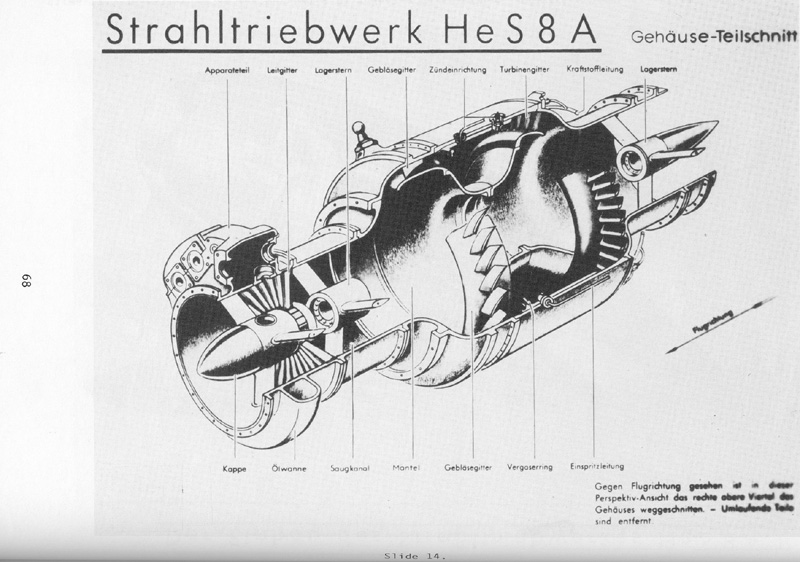
- Type: Turbojet
- National origin: Germany
- Manufacturer: Heinkel
- First run: September 1940

The Heinkel HeS 8 (an abbreviation of "Heinkel Strahltriebwerke 8" - Heinkel Jet Engine 8) was an early jet engine designed by Hans von Ohain while working at Heinkel. It was the first jet engine to be financially supported by the RLM, bearing the official name 109-001. Had development continued it would have been known as the Heinkel 001, but it does not appear this was used in practice.

The HeS 8 was intended to power the Heinkel He 280 twin-engine fighter, although both Heinkel and von Ohain preferred the axial HeS 30. A lengthy gestation period meant it was finally becoming ready for production at about the same time as the Junkers Jumo 004 and BMW 003. In 1942 work was ended on the HeS 8 and HeS 30, and Heinkel was ordered to move on to the larger Heinkel HeS 011 instead. The He 280 was left engineless, and was eventually abandoned.

== Design and development ==
By the time the HeS 3 program wound down in 1939, it appears that von Ohain no longer favoured the centrifugal compressor for jet engines. He had been "sold" on the axial compressor as early as 1938, after a meeting with D. Encke of AVA, but continued with the centrifugal design in the HeS 3 because it was much easier to work with. It is likely he would have developed an axial design as a follow-on to the HeS 3, but it appears the RLM was interested in keeping him working on centrifugal designs as a backup in case the various axial designs ran into problems.

The main problem with the centrifugal compressor was the large cross-sectional area. von Ohain had been looking at solutions to this problem as soon as the HeS 1 design was winding down in 1937. His first attempt at the HeS 3 was to separate the compressor and turbine —which were back-to-back in the HeS 1— and place the combustion chambers between them. Various problems in this original HeS 3 design forced them to abandon this layout for an updated HeS 3b, but it appears von Ohain felt it was still the best solution, and he returned to it for the HeS 8. The result was an engine that was only slightly wider than the compressor disk, whereas earlier models had piping lying outside the compressor disk and were therefore somewhat larger.

Another problem with the original engine series was that the compressor was fairly sensitive to disturbances in the intake airflow. To address this, the HeS 8 added a low-pressure impeller in the intake in front of the main compressor. The impeller did not add much to the compression, but by increasing pressure on the compressor face the airflow was greatly stabilized. The 14-blade impeller and 19-blade compressor were both made of milled aluminum. The 14-blade turbine was made of steel, and uncooled, which suggests turbine burnout would be common. The various components were connected together on a common tubular power shaft, supported by three ball races. The combustion chamber consisted of two diffusers that slowed the airflow from the compressor, and then injected fuel through 128 nozzles arranged in two sets at different "depths". Various accessories, including the starter, were grouped around the intake and did not add to the overall diameter.

Work progressed slowly, and by the time the first He 280 prototype was ready in September 1940 the engine was nowhere near ready for flight. The prototype then started glider testing while work on the engines and additional airframes continued. The engines were finally considered ready to go in early 1941, although at only 500 kg thrust instead of the planned 700 kg. The engines were later fitted and the He 280 first took to the air on 2 April 1941, although the cowlings had to be left off as the engine proved to leak fuel. Three days later the aircraft was demonstrated for a party of RLM officials, who were impressed, and full backing for Heinkel's program was forthcoming.

=== Cancellation ===
Development of the engine stalled at this point, and by early 1942 the thrust had crept up to only 550 kg. An attempt to improve the design by adding a single axial compressor stage behind the centrifugal compressor was used from V15 (the 15th prototype) on, and new airflow routing in the compressor started on V16. It appears about 30 engines were completed in total, the later models with the various improvements generating about 600 kg of thrust. But by this point the various all-axial designs, including Heinkel's own HeS 30, were progressing nicely. Helmut Schelp, in charge of jet development at the RLM, decided that the BMW 003 and Junkers Jumo 004 were "good enough", and cancelled all work on Heinkel's existing designs. Instead he asked them to move onto a "Class II" engine design of about 1,300 kg thrust, which would evolve as the Heinkel HeS 011.

== Variants ==
Several modifications of the basic HeS 8 design were also explored over the project's lifetime. The HeS 9 appears to be a modification adding a second axial compressor stage, and replacing the full centrifugal stage with a new "diagonal compressor" that Schelp favoured. Little is known about this design other than the fact that RLM ordered ten of them, but none was built. It appears it was this layout that was used to develop the 011. Another modification, the HeS 10, placed a complete HeS 8 engine inside a larger nacelle, and expanded the intake impellor to be larger than the engine. The HeS 10 appears to have been the first example of what would today be called a turbofan engine. In order to extract more power from the exhaust to drive the fan, an additional single axial-stage turbine was added behind the HeS 8's existing centrifugal one. The only real difference between the HeS 10 and a modern turbofan engine was that the fan was not powered independently of the core, although, given the separate axial turbine stage, this would not have been difficult to arrange.

== Specifications (V16 on) ==
Data from

==== General characteristics ====
- Type: turbojet
- Length: 2.400 m (7 ft 10-1/2 in)
- Diameter: 0.775 m (30-1/2 in)
- Dry weight: 380 kg (838 lb)

==== Components ====
- Compressor: centrifugal-axial
- Turbine: single-stage

==== Performance ====
- Maximum thrust: 6 kN (1,300 lbf) delivered; 7 kN (1,600 lbf) at 13,500 rpm planned.
- Overall pressure ratio: 2.7:1
- Thrust-to-weight ratio: 1.61 (delivered); 1.89 (planned).
