= Heinkel HeS 40 =

HeS 40
- Type: Constant volume gas turbine jet engine
- National origin: Germany
- Manufacturer: Heinkel-Hirth Motorenbau
- Designer: Adoph Müller

The Heinkel HeS 40 (HeS - Heinkel Strahltriebwerke) was an experimental constant-volume jet engine designed by Adoph Müller's team at Heinkel starting sometime in 1940 or 1941. It was based on the mechanical layout of the HeS 30, but replaced the conventional flame cans with oversized ones including large poppet valves that sealed off the chambers during firing. Constant-volume combustion, similar to the Otto cycle used in most piston engines, is considerably more fuel efficient than the constant-pressure combustion used in a typical jet engine.

== Design ==
The design was based on the HeS 30 not only to make parts more readily available as well as to make direct comparisons between the two easier. The main changes were to reduce the compression ratio of the compressor to about 2:1 (from 2.8:1), and add the new combustion chambers. The new chambers were considerably larger than the originals, forcing a reduction in the number from ten to six burners. The valve stems projected forward into streamlined fairings in the intake area behind the compressor.

The operational cycle of the engine is somewhat similar to a conventional six-cylinder engine, except the compressor did all the compressing instead of a piston stroke, and the chamber only served as a combustion chamber, rather than a compression, combustion and expansion chamber as in a piston engine. Compressed air, similar to an automobile equipped with a turbocharger, but at a higher pressure ratio, was channeled into the cylinders in turn, closed off with the poppet valves, and then burned. By the time the combustion was complete the pressure in the flame cans would be much higher, although the actual expansion ratio is not specified. The hot gas was then released, and flowed through a turbine to extract power, instead of forcing a piston to move (although most of the output in the expected turbojet engine format - as opposed to a turboshaft - would be extracted as thrust, and the turbine only acted to power the compressor to continue the cycle). Although there would be some loss of charge during the burning period, and thus the design would be less efficient than the true Otto cycle, it would nevertheless be somewhat more efficient than a traditional jet engine, at the cost of some complexity.

== History ==
It appears the HeS 40 was never built, and remained a paper design. Nevertheless, work on the design was ended by 1942, by which point the HeS 30 was making good progress.
