= Heinkel HeS 3 =

First operational aircraft jet engine

HeS 3
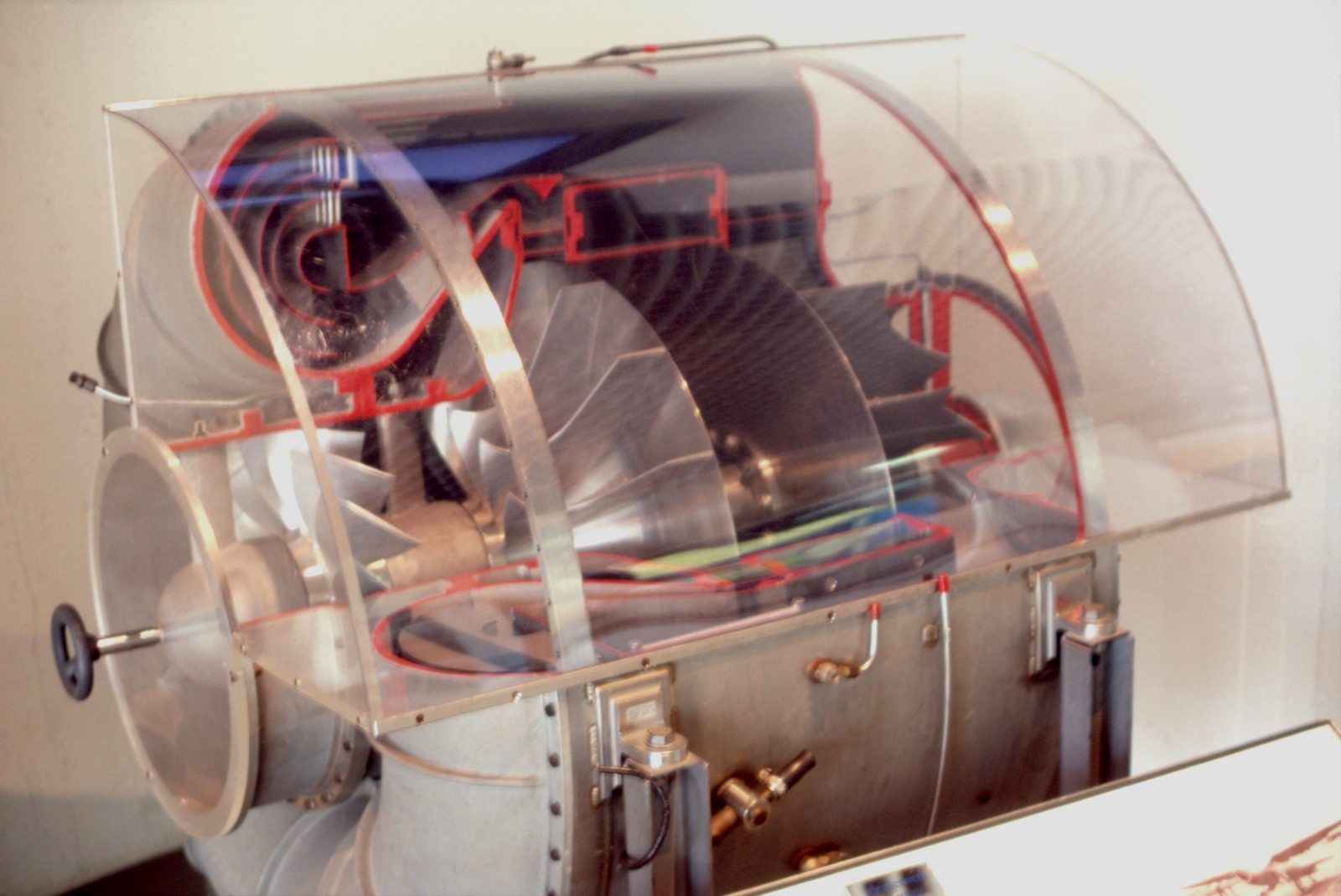
- A sectioned Heinkel HeS 3 Turbojet engine at the Deutsches Museum
- Type: Centrifugal flow turbojet engine
- National origin: Germany
- Manufacturer: Heinkel-Hirth Motorenwerke
- First run: 1939
- Major applications: Heinkel He 178
- Developed from: Heinkel HeS 1

The Heinkel HeS 3 (HeS - Heinkel Strahltriebwerke) was the world's first operational jet engine to power an aircraft. Designed by Hans von Ohain while working at Heinkel, the engine first flew as the primary power of the Heinkel He 178, piloted by Erich Warsitz on 27 August 1939. Although successful, the engine had too little thrust to be really useful, and work started on the more powerful Heinkel HeS 8 as their first production design.

== Development ==
The HeS 3 design was largely based on the HeS 1 but converted to burn liquid fuel instead of hydrogen gas used in the HeS 1. The first HeS 3 design was generally similar to the HeS 1, using an 8-blade inducer and 16-blade centrifugal compressor. The compressed air flowed into an annular combustion chamber between the compressor and turbine, which made the engine longer. The first example was bench tested around March 1938, but did not reach the design thrust because a small compressor and combustor had been used to reduce the frontal area. Max Hahn, from Heinkel, applied May 31, 1939, for a US patent, granted Sept 16, 1941: 'Aircraft Power Plant', US2256198, with the von Ohain design.

An improved engine, the HeS 3b, had a 14-blade inducer and 16 blade centrifugal compressor. In order to minimise the diameter the widest part of the annular combustor was placed in line with the smaller diameter axial entry to the impeller. At exit from the impeller the air flowed forwards, then turned through 180 degrees to flow rearward through the combustor. The flow was then turned radially inwards to enter the turbine. Although not as compact as the original design, the 3b was much simpler. The fuel was used to cool the rear roller bearing, which also preheated the fuel.

The engine was completed in early 1939, and was flight-tested under one of the remaining Heinkel He 118 dive bomber prototypes. The flight tests were carried out in extreme secrecy, taking off and landing under propeller power, and only flying in the early morning before other workers had arrived. Testing proceeded smoothly, but the engine eventually burned out its turbine.

A second engine was completed just after completion of the He 178 airframe, so it was decided to move directly to full flight tests. A short hop was made on 24 August during high-speed taxi tests, followed by full flight on 27 August, the first aircraft to fly solely under jet power. Testing continued and in November the aircraft was demonstrated to RLM officials in hopes of receiving funding for the development of a larger engine, but nothing seemed forthcoming.

Hans Mauch later told von Ohain the RLM was in fact extremely impressed, but he was concerned that Heinkel's airframe team did not have the knowledge to undertake engine development. Instead he and Helmut Schelp secretly visited a number of aircraft engine manufacturers to try to start programs there. Mauch left his position in 1939 leaving Schelp in command. Schelp was not as concerned about where development was taking place, and immediately started funding Heinkel to produce a more powerful engine.

=== HeS 6 ===
Work on a larger version, the HeS 6, started immediately, and was tested under a Heinkel He 111 late in 1939. While successful, raising thrust just above 590 kp (1,300 lbf), weight increased from 360 to 420 kg. The diameter of the engines remained too large to directly substitute the planned HeS 30 (109-006) engines on the He 280 fighter, therefore the design was abandoned in favour of the more compact Heinkel HeS 8 utilizing a straight-through flow combustion layout.

== Specifications (HeS 3b) ==
Data from

==== General characteristics ====
- Type: Centrifugal flow turbojet engine
- Length: 1,480 mm (58 in)
- Diameter: 930 mm (37 in)
- Dry weight: 360 kg (790 lb)

==== Components ====
- Compressor: 14-blade axial inducer + 16-blade centrifugal flow compressor
- Combustors: Reverse-flow annular
- Turbine: 12-blade radial inflow turbine
- Fuel type: Gasoline or Diesel fuel
- Oil system: pressure spray

==== Performance ====
- Maximum thrust: 4.9 kN; 1,100 lbf (500 kp) at 11,600 rpm (at SSL)
- Overall pressure ratio: 2.8:1
- Air mass flow: 12.6 kg/s (27.7 lb/s)

== Bibliography ==
- Gunston, Bill (2006). World Encyclopedia of Aero Engines: From the Pioneers to the Present Day (5th ed.). Stroud, UK: Sutton. ISBN 0-7509-4479-X.
- Kay, Anthony L. (2002). German Jet Engine and Gas Turbine Development 1930–1945. The Crowood Press. ISBN 1-84037-294-X.
- Kay, Anthony L. (2007). Turbojet History and Development 1930–1960. Vol. 1. Ramsbury: The Crowood Press. ISBN 978-1-86126-912-6.
- Lutz Warsitz: The First Jet Pilot - The Story of German Test Pilot Erich Warsitz, Pen and Sword Books, England, 2009, ISBN 978-1-84415-818-8
- Military Turbojet/Turbofan Specifications
- Pioneering Turbojet Developments of Dr. Hans von Ohain — From the HeS 1 to the HeS 011, Cyrus B. Meher-Homji and Erik Prisell, ,
