= Heinkel He 178 =

Experimental jet aircraft

He 178
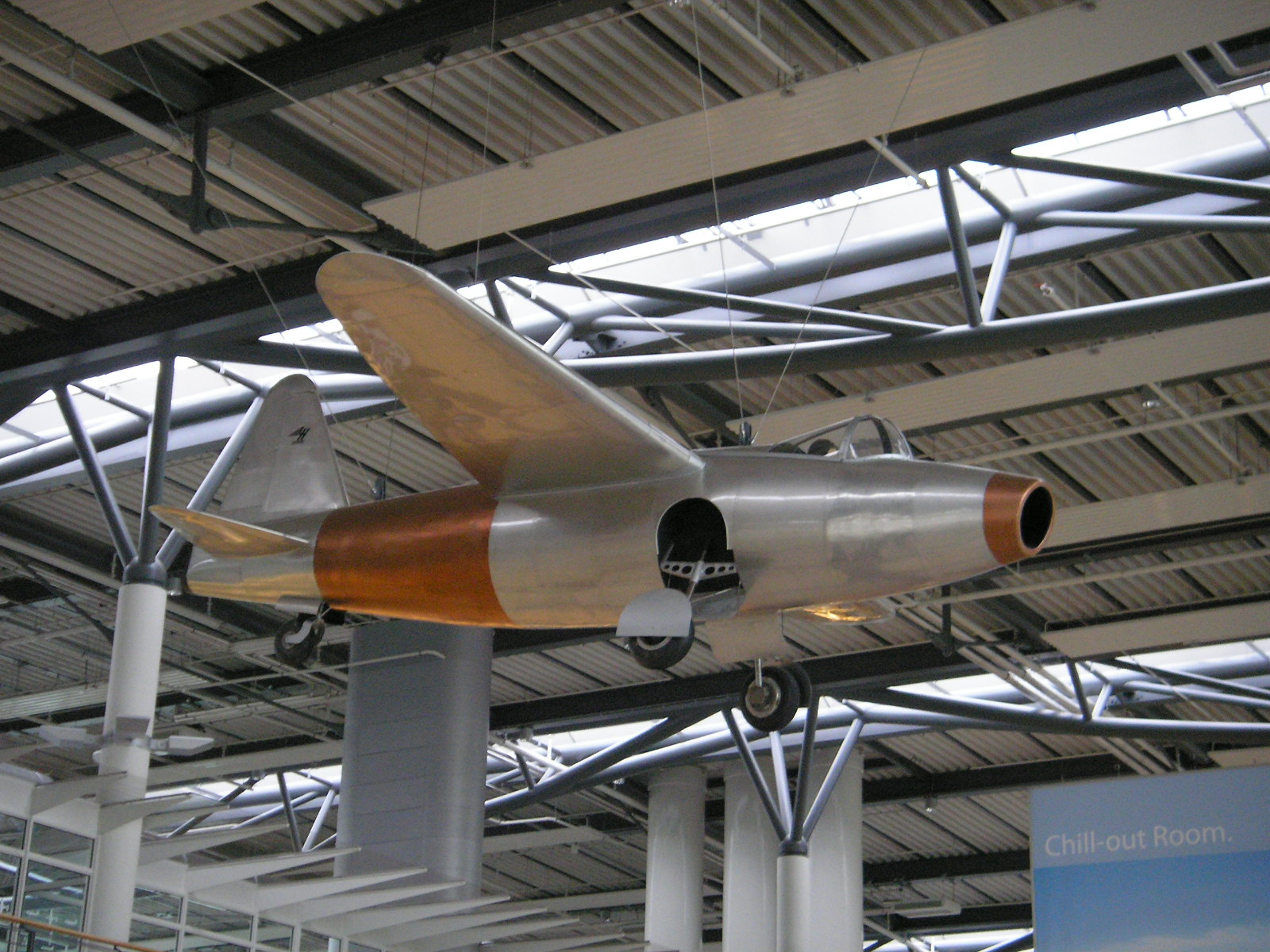
- He 178 replica at Rostock-Laage Airport

General information
- Type: Experimental prototype/Pioneer aircraft
- Manufacturer: Heinkel

History
- First flight: 27 August 1939

The Heinkel He 178 was an experimental aircraft designed and produced by the German aircraft manufacturer Heinkel. It was the world's first aircraft to fly using the thrust from a turbojet engine.

The He 178 was developed to test the jet propulsion concept devised by the German engineer Hans von Ohain during the mid-1930s. Having secured the industrial support of Ernst Heinkel, von Ohain was able to demonstrate a working turbojet engine, the Heinkel HeS 1, in September 1937. Heinkel pursued development of the He 178 as a private venture, independent of the German authorities and the Luftwaffe, keeping the aircraft relatively secret for much of its development. Heinkel was keen not only to demonstrate the capabilities of aviation gas turbines, but had a separate emphasis on developing high-speed flight technologies.

On 27 August 1939, the He 178 V1, the first prototype, performed its maiden flight, piloted by Erich Warsitz. This flight, which only lasted for six minutes, had been preceded by a short hop by the same aircraft three days prior. Due to its performance limitations, such as a maximum speed of 598 kilometres per hour (372 mph) and its relatively small endurance, the aircraft failed to impress high-ranking Nazi officials such as Ernst Udet and Erhard Milch, who attended a demonstration flight. Heinkel subsequently developed a twin-engined jet-powered fighter aircraft, building on the lessons of the He 178, the He 280. The He 178 provided valuable test data to guide the development of subsequent jet-powered aircraft. The He 178 V1 prototype itself went on static display in Berlin for a time before it was destroyed by an Allied air raid on the city in 1943.

== Development ==
=== Background ===
In 1935, Hans von Ohain, a young German engineer, successfully took out a patent on the use of the exhaust from a gas turbine as a means of propulsion. Von Ohain presented his idea to the aeronautical engineer Ernst Heinkel, who was sufficiently impressed that he agreed to help develop the concept. This industrial support would prove highly beneficial to von Ohain's work. According to New Scientist, Heinkel had already been interested in the potential of the gas turbine prior to encountering von Ohain and his work.

During September 1937, von Ohain successfully demonstrated his first engine, the Heinkel HeS 1. Accordingly, it was promptly decided to begin designing an aircraft for which a similar such engine could be installed and tested in the air. This aircraft, which would be designated He 178, was designed around von Ohain's third engine design, the HeS 3, which burned either diesel fuel or gasoline. To support the programme, the HeS 3 was test flown in a Heinkel He 118, but only as a supplemental engine to the conventional piston engine that it retained.

The He 178 was a relatively compact aircraft, featuring a primarily metal fuselage and using a largely conventional configuration and construction. The nose accommodated the air intake for the engine, which was housed within the central fuselage. The aircraft was fitted with tailwheel undercarriage. The main landing gear was intended to be retractable, but actually remained fixed in the "down" position throughout the flight trials. It was furnished with high-mounted wooden wings that had the characteristic Günter brothers elliptical trailing edge planform. Photos showing a "straight wing" (straight-line-taper in the wing planform, for the leading and trailing edges) were of the second prototype He 178 V2, which never flew under power.

=== Into flight ===
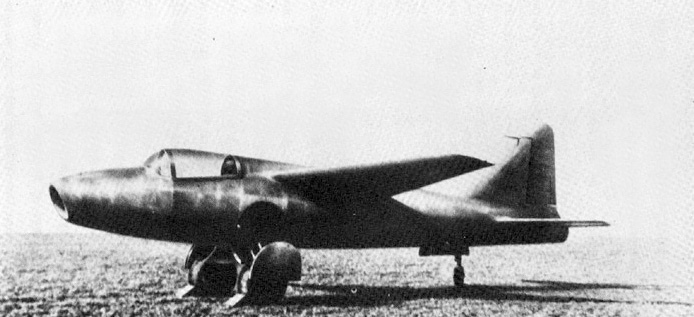
The He 178 V2 (note the squared-off wingtips). This particular aircraft flew only as an unpowered glider

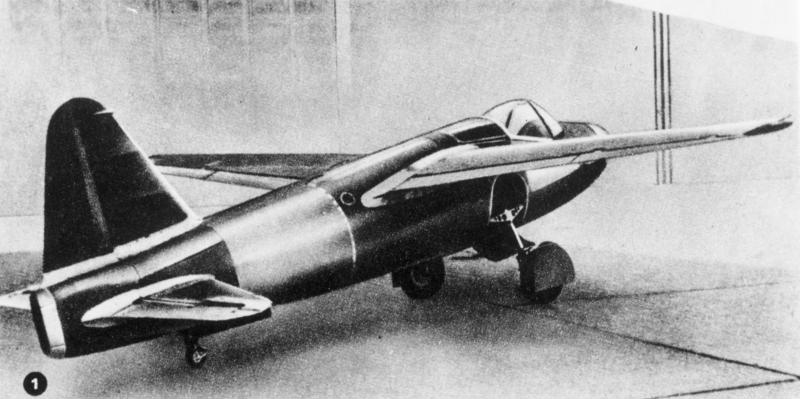
The He 178 drawing board design

On 27 August 1939, the aircraft performed its maiden flight, only days before Germany invaded Poland. This flight, piloted by Erich Warsitz, lasted only six minutes and almost ended in disaster due to a misjudgement during the unpowered landing approach, but was successfully recovered. Warsitz later described his groundbreaking flight: "I moved the throttle levers gently forward. As the aircraft began to roll I was initially rather disappointed at the thrust, for she did not shoot forward as the 176 had done, but moved off slowly. By the 300-metre mark she was moving very fast. Despite several attempts I could not retract the undercarriage. It was not important, all that mattered was that she flew. The rudder and all flaps worked almost normally, the turbine howled. Now I would have to take my chances with the landing, losing altitude by side-slipping. I restored her to the correct attitude just before touching down, made a wonderful landing and pulled up just short of the Warnow."

Heinkel had developed the turbojet engine and the testbed aircraft, the Heinkel He 178 V1, in great secrecy. Their existence was concealed even from the Luftwaffe. On 1 November 1939, after the German victory in Poland, Heinkel arranged a demonstration of the aircraft before a group of Nazi officials. While Hermann Göring, the commander in chief of the Luftwaffe, was not in attendance, the demonstration was watched by Ernst Udet and Erhard Milch, Minister of Aircraft Production and Supply; however, they were reportedly not impressed by its performance. While the He 178 had been a success on a technical basis, its speed was restricted to no greater than 598 kilometres per hour (372 mph), even when fitted with the more powerful HeS 6 engines, capable of generating up to 5.8 kN (1,300 lbf) of thrust, while its combat endurance was limited to only ten minutes.

=== Legacy ===
Heinkel was disappointed by the lack of official interest in his private-venture jet. In his autobiography, he attributes that to the failure of the leaders of the Reichsluftfahrtministerium to understand the advantages of jet propulsion and the breakthrough that He 178 represented. Undeterred by a lack of support from external officials, Heinkel decided to embark on the development of a twin-engine jet fighter as a private venture, harnessing what had been learned from flying the He 178 prototype. This would result in the He 280, the first prototype jet-powered fighter aircraft. It was not derived from the He 178, however, partially as some aspects of the design had been deemed to be unsuitable for further development, such as mounting the engine within the fuselage which proved to be impractical.

Unknown to Heinkel, the Reich Air Ministry had already been developing its own jet technology. In fact, in September 1939, the development of jet powered single-seat aircraft was ordered to continue despite a general order to cut back on non-core development work as to get certain aircraft types operational as soon as possible. However, the jet engines that would be developed by Junkers and BMW would differ considerably from those engines used by the He 178, instead favouring the axial flow approach in place of the earlier centrifugal design. Nevertheless, the He 178 programme was a valuable source of test data that aided subsequent development efforts considerably.

The He 178 V1 airframe was placed on display at the Deutsche Luftfahrtsammlung in Berlin, where it was destroyed in an air raid in 1943.

== Specifications ==
The Heinkel He 178 V2 – the airworthy V1's airframe possessed the elliptically shaped trailing-edged wing.

Data from

General characteristics

- Crew: 1
- Length: 7.48 m (24 ft 6 in)
- Wingspan: 7.2 m (23 ft 7 in)
- Height: 2.1 m (6 ft 11 in)
- Wing area: 9.1 m^{2} (98 sq ft)
- Airfoil: root: Günter symmetrical 11%; tip: Günter symmetrical 7%
- Empty weight: 1,620 kg (3,571 lb)
- Max takeoff weight: 1,998 kg (4,405 lb)
- Powerplant: 1 × Heinkel HeS 3 turbojet engine, 4.41 kN (992 lbf) thrust

Performance

- Maximum speed: 598 km/h (372 mph, 323 kn)
- Range: 200 km (120 mi, 110 nmi)

== See also ==
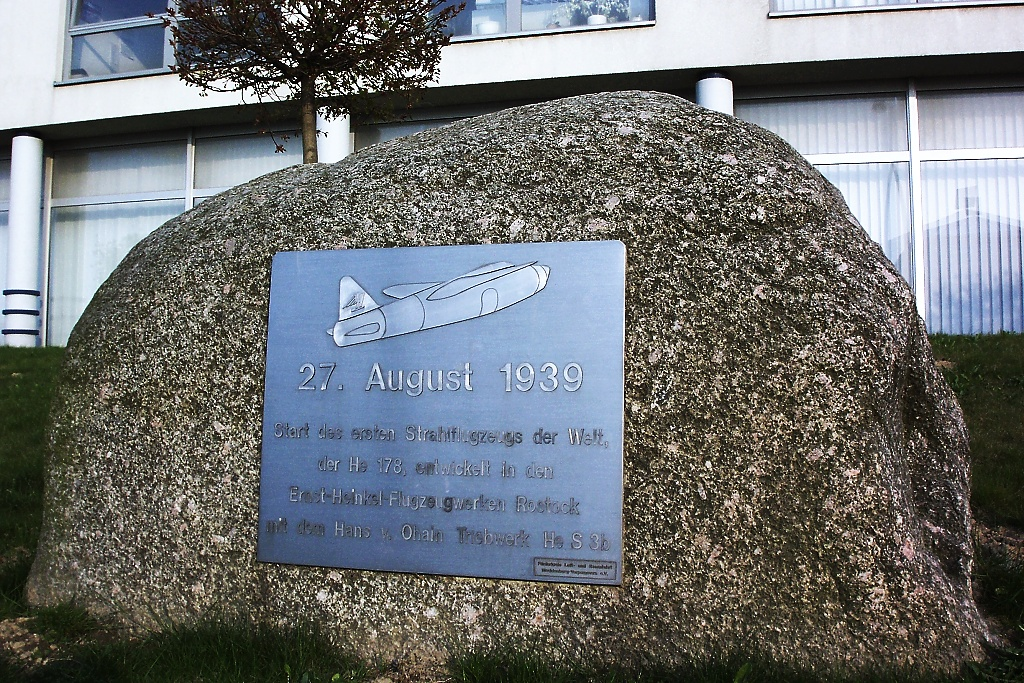
Memorial plaque honoring the world's first jet flight from Heinkel's "Marienehe" factory airfield, in today's Rostock-Schmarl district

Aircraft of comparable role, configuration, and era

- Bell P-59 Airacomet
- Gloster E.28/39
- Heinkel He 280

Related lists

- List of firsts in aviation
- List of German aircraft projects, 1939–45
- List of jet aircraft of World War II
- List of military aircraft of Germany
- List of World War II military aircraft of Germany
