= Heinkel HeS 30 =

Turbojet engine

HeS 30
- Type: Jet engine (gas turbine)
- National origin: Germany
- Manufacturer: Heinkel-Hirth Motorenbau
- Designer: Adolf Müller
- Variants: Heinkel HeS 40

The HeS 30 (HeS - Heinkel Strahltriebwerke) was an early jet engine, originally designed by Adolf Müller at Junkers, but eventually built and tested at Heinkel. It was possibly the best of the "Class I" engines, a class that included the more famous BMW 003 and Junkers Jumo 004. As it started somewhat later than these two designs, and was thus expected to enter service later, the Reichluftfahrtministerium (RLM) ordered Heinkel to stop work on the design and put their efforts into more advanced designs.

The HeS 30 was designed before the RLM introduced standardized naming for their engine projects. It was assigned the official name 109-006, and it was sometimes called the HeS 006 as a short form. Development ended just as these names were being introduced, so "HeS 30" naming is much more common.

== Design and development ==
=== The move ===
Herbert Wagner started engine developments at Junkers in 1936, placing Adolf Müller in overall charge of the project. In 1938 Junkers purchased Junkers Motoren (Jumo), formerly a separate company. In October 1939, under pressure from the RLM, Junkers moved all their engine work to Jumo's Dessau factories from their main plants at Magdeburg. Müller would have ended up in a subordinate role after the move, but decided to leave instead. He and about half of the original Junkers team were scooped up by Ernst Heinkel and moved to his primary Heinkel-Nord campus in Rostock-Schmarl, where Hans von Ohain was working on the Heinkel HeS 3 engine.

Of all of the designs Müller brought with him, the HeS 30 was simplest and easiest to build. Müller had already built a test engine while still at Junkers, however it was only able to run at about half its designed RPM, which limited compression and required a continuous supply of external compressed air. Junkers abandoned the design when Müller left, choosing to develop the Jumo team's simpler design instead. Müller promised Heinkel he could have the engine up and running on a testbed within one year of completing the move, a promise he was ultimately unable to keep.

Key to the engine's working cycle was an axial compressor of then-unique construction. Most German engines of the era had the stators do all of the actual compression, with the rotors speeding up the air for them to compress. In the HeS 30, the rotor and stators shared compression about 50-50, a design originally provided by Rudolph Friedrich of Junkers. Overall the engine had a five-stage compressor providing air at a compression ratio of 3:1 to ten flame cans, which powered a single-stage turbine. The turbine was also unique for the era, using a set of guide vanes that were adjustable for various operating speeds. Like most German axial engines, the engine also included a variable-geometry exhaust cone to lower back pressure when starting, but used an electric starter motor instead of the Riedel piston engine built into both the BMW 003 and Jumo 004.

=== Argument and resignation ===
Due to the move, it took considerable time for the team to restart work on the design, and even though three experimental engines were ordered as the 109-006 in 1939, it was not until May 1942 the first engine actually ran. In addition to problems with the move, the compressor turned out to provide more mass flow than initially suspected, forcing a redesign of the turbine. To add to the problems, Müller and Heinkel had an argument in May that eventually led to Müller resigning.

Work on the engine continued, and by October it was running at full speed. Of all of the early engines, the HeS 30 was by far the best design. It produced a thrust of 860 kg (1,900 lb), almost equidistant between the BMW 003's 800 kg (1,780 lb) and the Jumo 004's higher 900 kg (1,980 lb), but weighed only 390 kg (860 lb), providing a much better power-to-weight ratio than the dry weights of either the 003 at 562 kg (1,240 lb) or the 004 at 720 kg (1,585 lb). The HeS 30 concept also had better specific fuel consumption and was also smaller in cross-section. It has been said its overall performance was not matched until 1947.

=== Cancellation ===
Helmut Schelp, in charge of engine development at the RLM, refused to give Heinkel a production contract, an event Hans von Ohain claims brought Ernst Heinkel near tears. Schelp noted that while the design was excellent, BMW and Jumo were so far ahead they simply did not need another "Class I" engine – something that would prove ironic in another two years when both of those engines were still not operational. It also appears he had some misgivings about the compressor arrangement, but if this was the case it was never official. He also cancelled von Ohain's Heinkel HeS 8 at the same time.

Instead of yet another Class I engine, Schelp asked Heinkel to continue work on a Class II engine of about 1,300 kg thrust, which would be needed for reasonably sized single-engine fighters, and as a useful addition to twin-engine bombers. Thus work on the HeS 30 and HeS 8 ended, and Heinkel turned, grudgingly, to the Heinkel HeS 011, which would not enter production before the war ended. The remains of Müller's team were then moved to the Heinkel-Hirth plants to work on the new engine.

Starting some time in 1940 or '41, the basic mechanical layout of the HeS 30 was also used on an experimental constant-volume engine known as the Heinkel HeS 40.

== Specifications ==
Data from Kay, Turbojet History and Development 1930-1960

==== General characteristics ====
- Type: Turbojet
- Length: 2,718 mm (107.0 in)
- Diameter: 622 mm (24.5 in)
- Dry weight: 390 kg (860 lb)

==== Components ====
- Compressor: 5-stage axial
- Combustors: Can-annular, 10 chambers
- Turbine: 1-stage axial
- Fuel type: Petrol

==== Performance ====
- Maximum thrust: 8.4 kN (1,900 lbf) at 9100 rpm
- Overall pressure ratio: 3:1 Pressure ratio
- Thrust-to-weight ratio: 2.21

== Notes ==
=== Bibliography ===
- Christopher, John (2013). The Race for Hitler's X-Planes: Britain's 1945 Mission to Capture Secret Luftwaffe Technology. Stroud, UK: History Press. ISBN 978-0-7524-6457-2.
- Gunston, Bill (2006). World Encyclopedia of Aero Engines: From the Pioneers to the Present Day (5th ed.). Stroud, UK: Sutton. ISBN 0-7509-4479-X.
- Kay, Anthony L. (2002). German Jet Engine and Gas Turbine Development 1930–1945. The Crowood Press. ISBN 1-84037-294-X.
- Kay, Anthony L. (2007). Turbojet History and Development 1930–1960. Vol. 1. Ramsbury: The Crowood Press. ISBN 978-1-86126-912-6.
