= Daimler-Benz DB 007 =

1940s German turbofan aircraft engine project

DB 007
- Type: Axial flow turbofan
- National origin: Germany
- Manufacturer: Daimler-Benz
- Designer: Karl Leist
- First run: 27 May 1943
- Number built: at least 1

The Daimler-Benz DB 007 (RLM (Reichsluftfahrtministerium - Reich Air Ministry) designation ZTL 109-007, company designation ZTL6001) was an early German jet engine design stemming from design work carried out by Karl Leist from 1939. This was a complex design featuring contra-rotating stages and a bypass fan, making it one of the earliest turbofan designs to be produced. The end result of the design work was built as the DB 007 and began testing on a test-bed on 27 May 1943. Due to the expected low performance, complexity and the good results achieved by much simpler designs, work was halted on the DB 007 in May 1944 by order of the RLM.

== Design and development ==
After initial studies on gas turbines in the late 1920s, Daimler-Benz lost interest in them until 1939 with the arrival of Karl Leist. Work began immediately on the DB 670 (aka ZTL 5000), a ducted fan with compressor feeding an afterburner, driven by a DB 604 X-24 engine delivering 1,864 kW (2,500 hp). At a weight of 3,748 lb (1,700 kg), with an expected thrust of 6 kN (1,323 lbf) at a speed of 900 km/h (559 mph) and altitude of 19,685 ft (6,000 m) the DB 670 was abandoned due to the very low power/weight ratio. After a brief interlude studying pulse-jets Leist began work on what was to become the DB007.

Previous design efforts in Germany had investigated ducted fans (turbofans / by-pass turbojets) and contra-rotating compressor spools, but Leist incorporated both into the ZTL6000 (precursor to the ZTL 6001 / DB 007), resulting in a very complex design. Another novel feature was a turbine which passed alternately through the combustion chamber efflux and cooling air tapped from the bypass flow. By the Summer of 1942 design goals had been revised down and the new engine was given the designations ZTL6001 (company) and DB 007 / ZTL 109-007 (RLM), ZTL being an acronym for Zweikreiststurbinen-Luftstrahltriebwerk (two-circuit turbojet engine).

Air entered the engine through a conventional air intake, flow splitting after the initial guide vanes to the compressor inside and the ducted fan outside, with a by-pass ratio of approximately 2.45:1. The compressor consisted of seventeen stages of blading, eight carried on the inner drum, rotating at full engine speed, and nine on the outer drum which rotated in the opposite direction at 0.5:1 engine speed. Although extremely complicated mechanically, a compressor efficiency of 80% was expected with a very credible pressure ratio of 8:1. For comparison, typical engines of the era offered pressure ratios on the order of 3.5:1.

Further complication arose from the ducted fan which consisted of three stages of blading attached to the outside of the rotating compressor casing, with stators attached to the inside of the engine outer casing. Calculated efficiency of the fan section was 84%.

Air from the compressor passed to the four linked tubular combustion chambers, spaced evenly around the circumference with gaps to allow cool bypass air tapped from the by-pass duct to cool the turbine directly. Although this resulted in relatively poor turbine efficiency, at 74%, the cooling allowed a far higher Turbine Inlet Temperature (TIT) increasing the overall efficiency of combustion.

The turbine consisted of hollow nickel steel blading on a forged steel turbine wheel which drove the compressor via a hollow shaft and flexible coupling. the inner compressor drum was driven directly but a reduction gearbox drove the outer drum at half speed.

Structural materials were mainly cast aluminium alloys forward of the combustion chamber and welded sheet steel from the combustion chambers aft.

== Operational history ==
Only bench testing had been achieved before the program was cancelled in May 1944.

== Specifications (DB 007 / ZTL 6001) ==
Data from

==== General characteristics ====
- Type: Axial flow turbofan
- Length: 4,998.7 mm (196.8 in)
- Diameter: 899.2 mm (35.4 in)
- Dry weight: 1,300.0 kg (2,866 lb)

==== Components ====
- Compressor: 17-stage contra-rotating axial compressor + 3-stage ducted fan
- Combustors: 4 inter-connected tubular can combustion chambers, with cooling air gaps at the turbine
- Turbine: Single-stage axial flow turbine with cooling air flow over 30% of the circumference.
- Fuel type: J-2 diesel fuel (started with gasoline)
- Oil system: Pressure feed to main bearings, dry sump, oil grade 163 S.U. secs (35 cSt) (Intavia 7106) at 38 °C (100 °F)

==== Performance ====
- Maximum thrust: 12.50 kN (2,811 lbf) at 12,000 rpm at sea level
- Normal flight: 5.87 kN (1,320 lbf) at 12,000 rpm at altitude
- Overall pressure ratio: 8:1
- Bypass ratio: 71%
- Air mass flow: 7.98 kg (17.6 lb) per second at 12,000 rpm
- Specific fuel consumption: 137.6 kg/(kN h) (1.35 lb/(lbf h))
- Thrust-to-weight ratio: 0.98 at sea level

== See also ==
Related lists

- List of aircraft engines

== Notes ==
=== Bibliography ===
- Christopher, John (2013). The Race for Hitler's X-Planes: Britain's 1945 Mission to Capture Secret Luftwaffe Technology. Stroud, UK: History Press. ISBN 978-0-7524-6457-2.
- Gunston, Bill (2006). World Encyclopedia of Aero Engines: From the Pioneers to the Present Day (5th ed.). Stroud, UK: Sutton. ISBN 0-7509-4479-X.
- Kay, Anthony L. (2002). German Jet Engine and Gas Turbine Development 1930–1945. The Crowood Press. ISBN 1-84037-294-X.
- Kay, Antony (2004). Junkers Aircraft & Engines 1913–1945. London: Putnam Aeronautical Books. ISBN 0-85177-985-9.
- Kay, Anthony L. (2007). Turbojet History and Development 1930–1960. Vol. 1. Ramsbury: The Crowood Press. ISBN 978-1-86126-912-6.
- Wilkinson, Paul H. (1946). Aircraft Engines of the world 1946. London: Sir Isaac Pitman & Sons. pp. 294–297.
