= Hans Mauch =

German aerospace engineer (1906–1984)

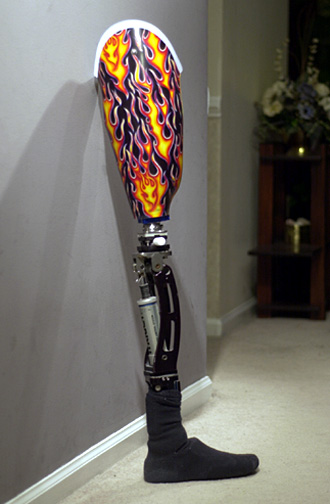
This customized artificial leg incorporates the Mauch S-N-S "Swing and Stance" hydraulic automatic movement. Designed in the late 1950s, the S-N-S design remains in widespread use.

Hans Adolph Mauch (6 March 1906 – 20 January 1984) was an engineer known for his work in early jet engine development in Germany, and aeromedical and prosthesis work in the USA in the post-war era. His S-N-S artificial leg design remains in widespread use in the 2010s.

== Early life and career ==
Hans Mauch was born in the Bad Cannstatt section of Stuttgart and studied mechanical, electrical and electronic engineering at universities in Stuttgart and Berlin. He received his Diplom at the Technische Hochschule in Charlottenburg (now Technische Universität Berlin) in 1929 near the top of his class. One of his professors was Georg Schlesinger, who had greatly advanced the art of prosthetics during World War I. Mauch began working on his PhD, but when another student published the same work at another university, he left school in 1930 and took a position at the E. Zwietusch company, where he worked on pneumatic tube designs. Here he worked on the development of an automated switching system that read labels on the capsules as they moved through the tubes.

== Ministry of Aviation ==
In 1935 he took a job at the Ministry of Aviation. In 1938 the Ministry re-organized its various internal departments, and in April Mauch took over the Special Development Division, which worked on JATO-type applications. When he heard rumours of a new engine being developed by Hans von Ohain, he visited the Heinkel plant and grilled the engineers for hours. In August he met Helmut Schelp, who was working on jet engines in the Ministry's technical division (the T-Amt). Mauch hired Schelp into the development division to take over management of the development program.

Mauch began organizing a major jet engine development program, but was concerned that such work might interfere with the traditional split between engine and airframe companies. In particular, he noted that both Heinkel and Junkers, who had started a similar program, lacked engineering talent in the engine field, and were working in primitive conditions. The two approached the traditional engine companies in order to convince them to buy these efforts, but found a mixed reception until considerable funding was offered. These companies were concerned about the lead the UK industry had built up in traditional aviation engine design, and were committed to improving existing designs before striking out on new efforts. Mauch initially suggested that Heinkel give up his team to Daimler-Benz, but instead settled for Heinkel's suggestion that they instead buy Hirth and move the work there. A similar solution was found for Junkers, who merged with the formerly spun-off Junkers Motoren. However, the Junkers move led to the team leader, Max Adolph Müller, being displaced in the company hierarchy, and a considerable number of the group left to join the new team at Hirth.

Mauch left the Ministry in 1939 to form a consulting company. During the war the company worked on a variety of projects, among them various testing and other devices for automobile and aviation engines. He was also contracted by the Ministry to take over final development of the V-1 flying bomb. During this time he also became involved with Ulrich Henschke, a radiologist who worked on prosthesis devices at the Aeromedical Institute in Munich. They worked on a mass-production artificial leg that could be quickly adapted to an individually fitted socket, as well as various ways to stabilize the knee for above-knee leg replacements.

During this period Mauch met Tatjana Schmitt of Vienna, and they married in 1948.

== In the US ==
When the war ended, the US Army Air Force brought many aviation engineers, including Mauch and Henschke, to Heidelberg. While there, the two wrote a major chapter on human factors and cybernetics entitled "How Man Controls" in a two-volume work on German Aviation Medicine - World War II. During a tour by an Army surgeon general in March 1946, the work was brought to the attention of the Americans, who soon arranged for Henschke and Mauch to be brought to Dayton, Ohio to work at the USAAF Aeromedical Laboratory. However, they had little time to work on prosthetics during this period, and had to form a group to continue their research at night and on weekends with a Veteran's Administration grant.

Mauch gained US citizenship in June 1955. He left the Aeromedical Lab in 1957 to form his own consulting firm, which was incorporated in 1959 as Mauch Laboratories. From then on, Mauch and Henschke were involved almost entirely in prosthesis research. Their most enduring product line started with the Model A stance-and-swing hydraulic leg, and after improvements it re-emerged as the widely used S-N-S model ("Swing-aNd-Stance"). A number of other companies also produced designs based on the Model A and B designs, under license. Mauch also developed a similar artificial ankle that was described as revolutionary and that it "levelled the world" by adapting to irregularities in the ground, but given small volumes available the system was never able to be built in a form that was reliable enough for release. The same basic ankle design using modern materials is an area of active research.

The company also introduced the Sterotoner, an early text-to-speech device for the blind, worked on human factors research, and developed an advanced spacesuit for NASA and the US Air Force. In all, Mauch had over 80 patents in his name.

== Death and awards ==
At the age of 78, Mauch suffered a massive stroke while working at his office. He died in hospital a week later. Among many awards, he received the Knights Cross to the Merit Cross, the highest civilian decoration in Germany, from the Ministry of Aviation in 1944. He was elected to the National Academy of Engineering in 1973 and served on its General Engineering Peer Group from 1976 to 1978.
