= Hans von Ohain =

German-American aerospace engineer (1911–1998)

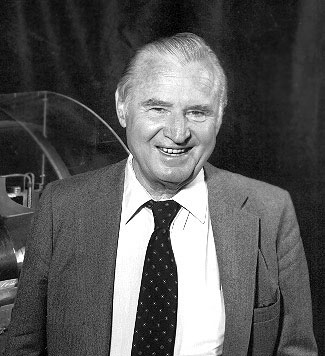
- Hans von Ohain in the 1970s
- Born: Hans Joachim Pabst von Ohain; 14 December 1911; Dessau, Duchy of Anhalt, German Empire
- Died: 13 March 1998 (aged 86); Melbourne, Florida, U.S.
- Education: University of Göttingen
- Occupation: Engineer (jet propulsion)
- Spouse: Hanny von Ohain
- Children: 4

Hans Joachim Pabst von Ohain (14 December 1911 – 13 March 1998) was a German-American physicist, engineer, and the designer of the first aircraft to use a turbojet engine. Together with Frank Whittle and Anselm Franz, he has been described as the co-inventor of the turbojet engine. Additionally, prior to building his engine and filing his own patent in 1935, von Ohain had read and critiqued Whittle's patents. Von Ohain stated in his biography that "My interest in jet propulsion began in the fall of 1933 when I was in my seventh semester at Göttingen University. I didn't know that many people before me had the same thought." Unlike Whittle, von Ohain had the significant advantage of being supported by an aircraft manufacturer, Heinkel, who funded his work.

When in 1935 von Ohain designed his overall engine layout, he based it for compactness on a centrifugal impeller (centrifugal or radial compressor) and a radial inflow turbine.

Ultimately, this configuration had too many shortcomings to be put into production; however, aided by the enormous resources of the Heinkel Aircraft Company, a developed version was sufficient to power the He 178, and on 27 August 1939 von Ohain entered history as the designer of the world's first gas turbine to power an aircraft.

Von Ohain stayed with centrifugal designs, contributing his research to Heinkel's other projects such as the combined centrifugal/axial HeS8 and 011, but ultimately none of his designs was put into production. Other competing German designers at Junkers and BMW, following the axial design layout, saw their engines brought into production, although they never solved some of the basic power and durability problems. Von Ohain nevertheless started the world's first jet engine industry in his homeland of Germany, with many prototypes and series productions built until 1945.

Von Ohain, having entered turbojet design some time later than Whittle, began working on his first turbojet engine designs during the same period that Whittle was building his WU engine in Britain. Their turbojet designs have been said by some to be an example of simultaneous invention. However, von Ohain explains in his biography that, in 1935, while his own patent was being prepared (and before he had begun construction of an engine), his lawyer gave him a copy of Whittle's patent, which he read and critiqued. As a result, he was forced to modify his own application so as not to infringe on Whittle's design.

The core of Ohain's first jet engine, the Heinkel HeS 1, which he described as his "hydrogen test engine," was run "in March or early April" according to Ohain (although Ernst Heinkel's diaries record it as September 1937).

Work on the hydrogen test engine continued, but the engine required modifications to fix overtemperature problems and to fit a fuel system to enable it to run self-contained on liquid fuel, which was achieved in September 1937. With the heavy backing of Heinkel, Ohain's jet engine was the first to power an aircraft, the Heinkel He 178 aircraft in 1939, which was followed by Whittle's engine within the Gloster E.28/39 in 1941. Turbojet powered fighter aircraft from both Germany and Britain entered operational use virtually simultaneously in July 1944: the Me 262 on July 26 and the Gloster Meteor on July 27 of 1944. The Me 262 was the first operational fighter jet and saw flight combat with hundreds of machines, while the few dozen Meteors saw limited action.

Although Von Ohain and Whittle both knew about axial flow compressors, they remained dedicated to improving centrifugal compressor engines to power respectively the Heinkel He 178 and the Gloster E.28/39 until the end of the Second World War. Axial flow compressor jet engines were instead developed in parallel by Anselm Franz (Junkers) and Hermann Oestrich (BMW) to design the similar Jumo 004 and BMW 003 engines, designs that were eventually adopted by most manufacturers by the 1950s.

After the war the two men met, became friends and received the Charles Stark Draper Prize for Engineering "for their independent development of the turbojet engine."

== Early life and jet development ==
Born in Dessau, Germany, Ohain finished high school in 1930 at the Arndt-Gymnasium in Dahlem and earned a PhD in physics in 1935 at the University of Göttingen, with his thesis entitled An Interference Light Relay for White Light on an optical microphone to record sound directly to film, which led to his first patent. The University of Göttingen was then one of the major centers for aeronautical research, with Ohain having attended lectures by Ludwig Prandtl. In 1933, while still a student, he conceived what he called "an engine that did not require a propeller".

After receiving his PhD in 1935, Ohain became the junior assistant of Robert Wichard Pohl, then director of the Physical Institute of the university. In 1936, while working for Pohl, Ohain registered a patent on his version of a jet engine, Process and Apparatus for Producing Airstreams for Propelling Airplanes. Unlike Frank Whittle's Power Jets WU design with its axial flow turbine, Ohain used a radial in-flow turbine to go with a centrifugal compressor, placing them back-to-back with an annular combustion space wrapped around the rotor.

While working at the university, Ohain used to take his sports car to be serviced at a local garage, Bartles and Becker. There he met an automotive mechanic, Max Hahn, and eventually arranged for him to build a demonstration model of his engine for 500 ℛ︁ℳ︁. The completed model was larger in diameter than Whittle's fully working engine of 1937, although much shorter. Ohain took the model to the university for testing but ran into problems with combustion of the petrol fuel, which took place mostly after the turbine, sending flames shooting out from the exhaust duct. The lack of combustion before the turbine contributed to the engine being unable to run without the assistance of the electric motor which subsequently overheated.

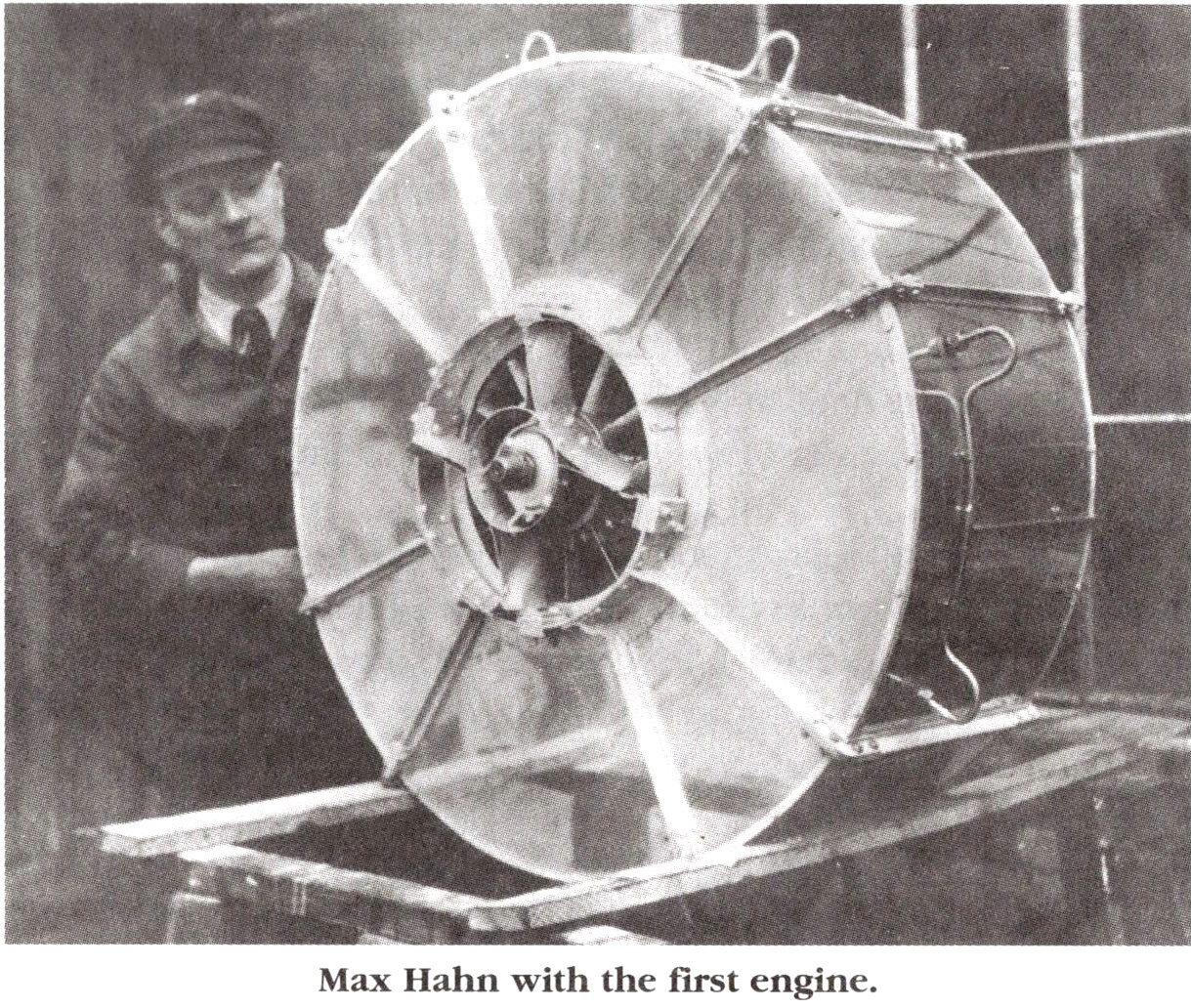
Mechanic Max Hahn and the major components of Hans von Ohain's test engine

According to von Ohain, "My interest in jet engines began in about 1933. I found that the elegance of flying was spoiled by the enormous vibrations and noise from the piston engine/propeller combination. I came to the conclusion that a constant work process, i.e. constant compression, combustion, expansion, would have great advantages. Thus I chose a quite simple engine, a radial compressor with a radial turbine."

However, the model he and Max Hahn built and tested in the courtyard of the Institute showed the combustion chamber needed further development. As a consequence, Pohl and von Ohain decided to approach Heinkel as someone who "doesn't back away from new ideas".

== Heinkel ==
In February 1936, Pohl wrote to Ernst Heinkel, telling him about Ohain's design and its possibilities. Heinkel arranged a meeting between his engineers and Ohain, during which he argued that the current "garage engine" would never work, but that the concept upon which it was based was sound. The engineers were convinced, and in April Ohain and Hahn began working for Heinkel at the Marienehe airfield outside Rostock, in Warnemuende.

Working with Engineer Gundermann and Hahn in Special Development, von Ohain states: "Under pressure of aiming to bring a combustion chamber of unknown endurance to flight readiness, I came upon the idea of separating the turbine problem from the combustion chamber problem by using hydrogen fuel. As a physicist, I knew of course that the diffusion and combustion speed of gaseous hydrogen was substantially greater than that of petrol."

A study of the model's airflow resulted in several improvements over a two-month period. Encouraged by these findings, Ohain produced a new prototype that would run on hydrogen gas supplied by an external pressurised source. The resulting Heinkel-Strahltriebwerk 1 (HeS 1), German for Heinkel Jet Engine 1, was built by hand-picking some of the best machinists in the company, much to the chagrin of the shop-floor supervisors. Hahn, meanwhile, worked on the combustion problem, an area in which he had some experience.

The engine was extremely simple, made largely of sheet metal. Construction, by the blacksmith in his village, started late in the summer of 1936 and was completed in March 1937. Two weeks later the engine was running on hydrogen, but the high temperature exhaust led to considerable "burning" of the metal. The tests were otherwise successful, and in September the combustor was replaced and the engine was run on gasoline for the first time. Running on gasoline caused the combustor to clog up. Although the engine was never intended to be a flight-quality design, it proved beyond a doubt that the basic concept was workable, and Ohain had at last caught up with Whittle. With vastly more funding and industry support, Ohain would soon overtake Whittle and forge ahead.

=== Unaware of Whittle? ===
It has often been claimed that Ohain was unaware of Whittle's work. While in a very strict sense this may be true (in that he was unaware of Whittle's experiments at Lutterworth where the RAF engineer ran the world's first jet engine on the 12th of April 1937), nevertheless Ohain had been given a copy of Whittle's patents by his lawyer, while his own patent application being prepared and before he had begun construction of his test engine.

In his biography, the following commentary appears in which Ohain frankly critiqued Whittle's design:

The patent attorney happened upon a Whittle patent during the years that the von Ohain patents were being formulated.

About Whittle’s patent von Ohain said, “We felt it looked like a patent of an idea. You find many idea patents. For an invention, it is not necessary that you build it. We thought it was not being seriously worked on. I had not the slightest idea that Whittle was at that time working very keenly along similar lines but with different technical approaches.”

Hans described the difference: "Our structure was very unconventional and completely different from Whittle’s in almost every respect. Our patent claims did have to be narrowed in comparison to Whittle’s, because Whittle’s showed certain things.

When I saw Whittle’s patent, I was almost convinced that it had something to do with boundary-layer suction combinations. It had a two-flow, dual entrance flow, radial flow compressor that looked monstrous from an engine point of view. Its flow reversal looked to us to be an undesirable thing, but it turned out that it wasn’t so bad after all, though it gave some minor instability problems."

=== Developing the engine ===
In February 1937, the turbine section was running on a test stand. According to von Ohain, "We were now working on a machine capable of powering an aircraft, the forerunner of the He-S3B. I had intended to put the combustion chamber between the compressor and the turbine, as we had done with the hydrogen unit, but Hahn suggested putting it ahead of them, which was an excellent idea." The He-S3 turbine was test flown by Erich Warsitz and Walter Künzel in a Heinkel He 118, providing additional throttled thrust to the conventional engine.

While work on the HeS 1 continued, the Pohl-Ohain team had already moved on to the design of a flight-quality engine, the HeS 3. The major differences were the use of machined compressor and turbine stages, replacing the bent and folded sheet metal, and a re-arrangement of the layout to reduce the cross-sectional area of the engine by placing the annular combustor in an extended gap between the compressor and turbine. The original turbine was too small to work efficiently.

In the beginning of 1939, the He-S3A was fitted into the He 178 airframe for a standing display at Roggentin on 3 July 1939. Yet this turbine was still not powerful enough for flight. According to von Ohain, "We experimented with various combinations to modify the compressor diffuser and turbine nozzle vanes to increase thrust sufficiently to qualify the aircraft for the first flight demonstration. We found that a small diffuser behind the engine with a collar and splitter to divert flows functioned better than a high speed flow through the entire tube. The final result of the changes was the He-S3B."

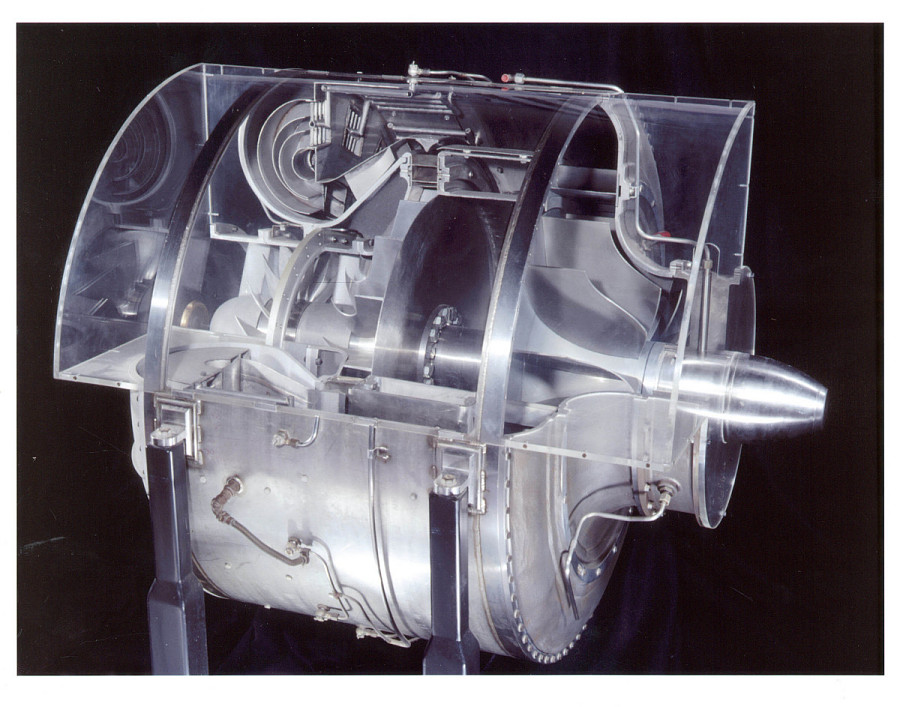
Hans von Ohain's Centrifugal compressor /Radial inflow turbine HeS3B

A new design, the HeS 3b was proposed, which lengthened the combustor by placing the forward part of it in front of the compressor outer rim. While not as small as the original HeS 3 design, the 3b was nevertheless fairly compact. The 3b first ran in July 1939 (some references say in May), and was air-tested under the Heinkel He 118 dive bomber prototype. The original 3b engine soon burned out, but a second one was nearing completion at about the same time as a new test airframe, the Heinkel He 178, which first flew on 27 August 1939, the first jet-powered aircraft to fly by test pilot Erich Warsitz. Heinkel had applied, May 31, 1939, for a patent: US2256198 Espacenet - Original document, an 'Aircraft power plant', inventor Max Hahn. First application for this patent in Germany was May, 1938.

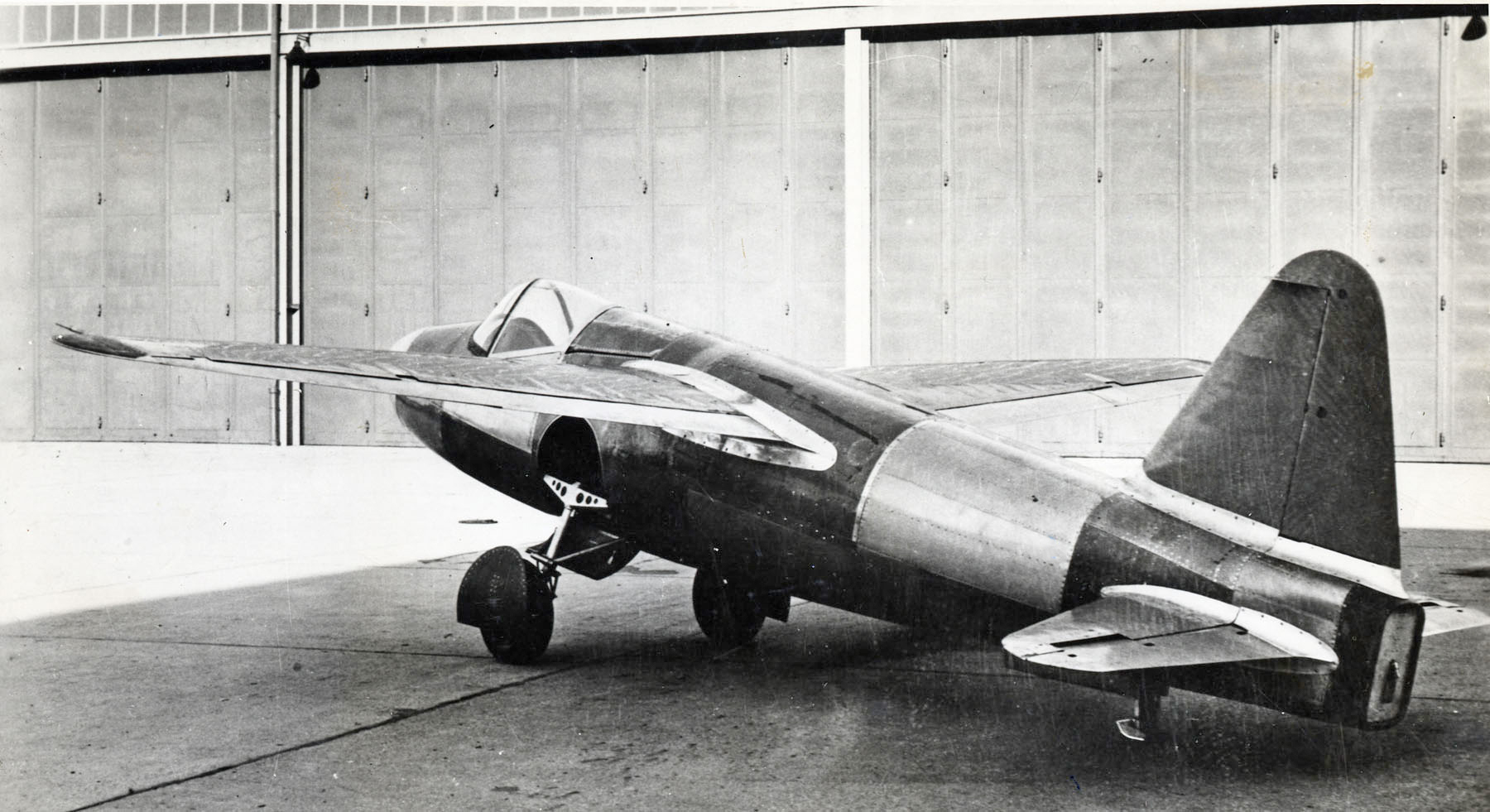
Heinkel He 178 050602-F-1234P-002

Hans von Ohain leads a toast after the successful flight of the Heinkel He 178. Ernst Heinkel raises his glass on the left side of the image.

Work started immediately on larger versions, first the HeS 6 which was simply a larger HeS 3b, and then on a new design known as the HeS 8 which once again re-arranged the overall layout. The compressor and turbine were connected with a large-diameter drum long-enough to fit an annular combustion chamber between them. It was intended to install the engine on the Heinkel He 280 fighter, but the airframe development progressed much more smoothly than the engine, and had to be used in gliding tests while work on the engine continued. A flight-quality HeS 8 was installed in late March 1941, followed by the first flight on 2 April. Three days later the aircraft was demonstrated for a party of Nazi and RLM officials, all of whom were impressed. Full development funds soon followed.

By this point there were a number of turbojet developments taking place in Germany. Heinkel was so impressed by the concept that he arranged the transfer to the project of Adolph Müller from Junkers, who was developing an axial compressor-powered design, renamed as the Heinkel HeS 30. Müller left Junkers after they purchased the Junkers Motoren company, who had their own project under way, which by this time was known as the Junkers Jumo 004. Meanwhile, BMW was making good progress with its own design, the BMW 003.

By early 1942 the HeS 8, officially the 109-001 (HeS 001), was still not progressing well. Meanwhile, Müller's HeS 30, officially the 109-006 (HeS 006), was developing much more quickly. Both engines were still some time from being ready for production, however, while the 003 and 004 appeared to be ready to go. In early 1942 the director of jet development at the RLM, Helmut Schelp, refused further funding for both designs, and ordered Heinkel to work on a new "pet project" of his own, eventually becoming the Heinkel HeS 011. Although this was the first of Schelp's "Class II" engines to start working well, production had still not started when the war ended. Work continued on the HeS 8 for some time, but it was eventually abandoned in the spring of 1943.

=== Ultimate outcome ===
Part of the challenge for von Ohain was his approach to designing a practical turbojet that could be developed. His primary design comprised a centrifugal compressor with a radial inflow turbine, a design that proved to be impractical and as a result, despite much effort, was never put into production.

By comparison, Whittle's centrifugal flow engines, in both straight-through and reverse flow configuration (developed further by Rolls Royce), powered all Allied World War II jets and the majority of immediate post-war fighters. They were built under licence in numerous countries including Australia, France and the US and were copied by the Soviets and Chinese to power the MiG-15 and MiG-17. Whittle's basic reverse flow design remains the most common small gas turbine/turboshaft/turboprop configuration in production today with over 80,000 built in the form of the Allison (RR) 250/300 and Pratt & Whitney PT6 series of engines.

== Post-World War II ==
In 1947, Ohain was brought to the United States by Operation Paperclip and went to work for the United States Air Force at Wright-Patterson Air Force Base. In 1956 he was made the Director of the Air Force Aeronautical Research Laboratory and by 1975 he was the Chief Scientist of the Aero Propulsion Laboratory there.

During his work at Wright-Patterson, Ohain continued his own personal work on various topics. In the early 1960s he did a fair amount of work on the design of gas core reactor rockets which would retain the nuclear fuel while allowing the working mass to be used as exhaust. The engineering needed for this role was also used for a variety of other "down to earth" purposes, including centrifuges and pumps. Ohain would later use the basic mass-flow techniques of these designs to create a fascinating jet engine with no moving parts, in which the airflow through the engine created a stable vortex that acted as the compressor and turbine.

This interest in mass-flow led Ohain to research magnetohydrodynamics (MHD) for power generation, noting that the hot gases from a coal-fired plant could be used to extract power from their speed when exiting the combustion chamber, remaining hot enough to then power a conventional steam turbine. Thus an MHD generator could extract further power from the coal, and lead to greater efficiencies. Unfortunately this design has proven difficult to build due to a lack of proper materials, namely high-temperature non-magnetic materials that are also able to withstand the chemically active exhaust. Ohain also investigated other power related concepts.

He also invented the idea of the "jet wing", in which air from the compressor of a jet engine is bled off to large "augmented" vents in the wings to provide lift for VTOL aircraft. A small amount of high-pressure air is blown into a venturi, which in turn sucks a much larger volume of air along with it, thus leading to "thrust augmentation". The concept was used in the Rockwell XFV-12 experimental aircraft, although the market interest in VTOL aircraft was short-lived. He participated in several other patents.

Ohain was the influence in shifting the mind of Paul Bevilaqua, one of his students at WP-AFB, from math to engineering, which later enabled Bevilaqua to invent the Rolls-Royce LiftSystem for the JSF F35B STOVL: "in school I learned how to move the pieces, and Hans taught me how to play chess". Ohain also showed Bevilaqua "what those TS-diagrams actually mean".

Ohain retired from Wright-Patterson in 1979 and took up an associate professor position teaching propulsion and thermodynamics at the nearby University of Dayton, spending winter sessions from 1981 to 1983 teaching the same subjects at the University of Florida. Ohain continued at the University of Dayton until 1992, when concerns about his health prompted a move with his wife, Hanny, to Melbourne, Florida.

== Awards ==
During his career, Ohain won many engineering and management awards, including (among others) the American Institute of Aeronautics and Astronautics (AIAA) Goddard Astronautics Award, the United States Air Force Exceptional Civilian Service Award, Systems Command Award for Exceptional Civilian Service, the Eugene M. Zuckert Management Award, the Air Force Special Achievement Award, and just before he retired, the Citation of Honor. In 1984–85, Ohain served as the Charles A. Lindbergh Chair in Aerospace History, a competitive senior fellowship at the National Air and Space Museum. In 1991 Ohain and Whittle were jointly awarded the Charles Stark Draper Prize for their work on turbojet engines. Ohain was elected a member of the U.S. National Academy of Engineering (NAE).

Ohain was awarded the Ludwig-Prandtl-Ring from the Deutsche Gesellschaft für Luft- und Raumfahrt (German Society for Aeronautics and Astronautics) for "outstanding contribution in the field of aerospace engineering" in 1992.

In 1982, Ohain was inducted into the International Air & Space Hall of Fame at the San Diego Air & Space Museum.

In 1990, Ohain was inducted into the National Aviation Hall of Fame.

== Death ==
Ohain died in Melbourne, Florida, in 1998, aged 86. He was survived by his wife and four children. One of his sons, Christopher von Ohain, joined the United States Marine Corps (USMC). Christopher's son, Hans Christopher von Ohain, also joined the USMC; he was killed in a car accident in 2022.

== See also ==
- List of German inventors and discoverers
- Nathan C. Price
- Frank Whittle
- Arkhip Lyulka

== Sources ==
- Dorr, Robert F. (2013). Fighting Hitler's Jets. Voyageur Press. ISBN 978-0-7603-4398-2.
- Listemann, Phil H. (2016). The Gloster Meteor F.I & F.III. Philedition. ISBN 978-2-918590-95-8.
- Neufeld, Jacob (1997). Technology and the Air Force: A Retrospective Assessment. DIANE Publishing. pp. 7–8. ISBN 1-4289-1358-0.
