= Helmut Schelp =

German engineer (1911–1998)

- Born: 11 June 1912; Görlitz, German Empire
- Died: 8 May 1994 (aged 81); Cupertino, United States
- Occupation: Engineer (jet propulsion)
- Known for: Leading the development of jet engines at the German Air Ministry's technical directorate
- Political party: Nazi Party (1931-1945)
- Spouse: Gertraud Ladwig

Helmut Schelp was the director of advanced engine development at the RLM's T-Amt technical division leading up to and during World War II. He used his office to fund a widespread program in jet engine development, which led to many of the engine concepts still used today. Unlike the United Kingdom, where the jet had no single champion within the Air Ministry and their efforts were long delayed as a result, Schelp can be directly credited with the advancement and refinement of the jet in Germany over a few years.

== Biography ==
Born in Görlitz, Germany, Schelp finished high school in 1927 and went on to study mechanical engineering in Chemnitz and Dresden, before traveling to the United States where he completed a Master of Science in engineering at Stevens University in Hoboken, NJ.

While studying in Chemnitz in 1931, Schelp joined the Nazi Party. He later became a squad leader in the Nazi paramilitary wing, the Sturmabteilung. From 1932 to 1933 he was trained and qualified as a pilot.

On his return to Germany in 1936, Schelp was invited to join a new advanced course in aeronautical engineering being offered by the DVL research institute in Berlin. Following in Frank Whittle's footsteps of a few years earlier, Schelp became interested in the problems of high-speed flight, and attempted to calculate the maximum speed an aircraft could obtain. He eventually came to the conclusion that flights over Mach 0.82 were impossible due to the decreasing efficiency of propellers, which one of his professors at DVL demonstrated would be only 71% at Mach 0.82, and falling rapidly. For higher speeds a much larger engine would be needed, one whose weight would offset the amount of thrust that could be generated by the propeller. He was aware of developments in jet engines, and became convinced they were the only way forward.

=== Career ===
In August 1937 Schelp joined the T-Amt's LC1 technical department, their short-lived pure-research arm. Neither LC1 nor DVL shared his enthusiasm for the jet engine, but when the RLM was re-organized in 1938, he found himself in the LC8 division which organized aircraft engine development. Here he found an ally in Hans Mauch, in charge of rocket and pulsejet development within LC8, who had seen a demonstration of Hans von Ohain's engine at the Heinkel works. Mauch was adamant that only engine companies should work on such projects and refused official funding for Heinkel's developments as they were taking place at an airframe company. Mauch and Schelp did meet with most of the larger engine companies, notably BMW, Bramo, Jumo and Daimler-Benz, none of whom proved to be terribly interested, mostly because they were in the midst of bringing new piston designs into production.

Eventually the jet engine concept started to become more widely known within the RLM, and Schelp and Mauch started to push for the immediate development of a flightworthy model. Mauch left to form a consulting firm in 1939, and Schelp took over the development program. This program was directly opposed by Wolfram Eisenlohr, director of LC8 (now known as GL/C3 after another departmental reorganisation), who felt that a longer term project was needed to develop such a new concept. Eventually matters came to a head when Ernst Udet, director of the T-Amt as a whole, overruled Eisenlohr, allowing development to continue. By 1941 the engines appeared to be maturing quickly and even Eisenlohr was convinced the project was worthwhile, becoming a strong supporter.

Schelp proposed a program consisting of three classes of engines, Class I were early designs with under 1,000 kg of thrust like the Junkers Jumo 004 and BMW 003 that were suitable only for light fighters or somewhat larger twin-engine designs, Class II were larger and more advanced engines of over 1,000 kg thrust suitable for reasonably-sized single-engine fighters and twin-engine light bombers, and Class III were very large engines suitable for larger bombers. In order to move such a program along, Schelp told Heinkel to stop working on the Class I Heinkel HeS 8 and Heinkel HeS 30 engine designs and concentrate only on the Class II Heinkel HeS 011. At the time, in 1942, this decision made sense considering that two other Class I engines appeared to be ready to enter production. The eventual three-year delay before the 003 or 004 entered service may have meant the HeS 30 would have beaten them to service, and in the end the HeS 011 would never leave the prototype phase.

Schelp also used his influence to force Heinkel to develop one of his pet projects, the "diagonal compressor", a sort of combination of the centrifugal and axial designs. At the time the pure axial compressors were having problems with surging and air intake turbulence, while the centrifugal designs proved fairly immune to these problems. Although it was mechanically possible to arrange a centrifugal stage in front of axial ones, this arrangement would require a large frontal area, and a small frontal area was the only real reason to use an axial arrangement. Schelp's diagonal stage appeared to offer the best of both worlds, only slightly larger than an axial stage of the same air flow, but with much wider-chord blades that should be more resistant to airflow problems. Schelp demanded that the HeS 011 use this design, which proved to be much more difficult to build than originally thought, and led to lengthy delays in that project.

After the war, Schelp was taken to London where he was on 24-hour call if anyone in the Air Ministry wanted to talk to him. This was rarely done, and Schelp found himself able to wander London at will. On one such trip he came across the Gloster E.28/39, bearing a plaque that stated it was the first turbojet powered aircraft to fly. It had actually been beaten into the air by over a year by the Heinkel He 178, and when Schelp pointed this out it was wryly suggested there may be some inaccuracy with the plaque.

In 1946, Schelp moved to the United States as part of Operation Paperclip to work on small gas turbines. In 1951, he joined the Garrett Corporation, where he remained until his retirement in 1977. After retiring, Schelp continued to do consultancy work for the Garrett Corporation until 1986.
