= Heinkel He 118 =

German dive bomber

He 118
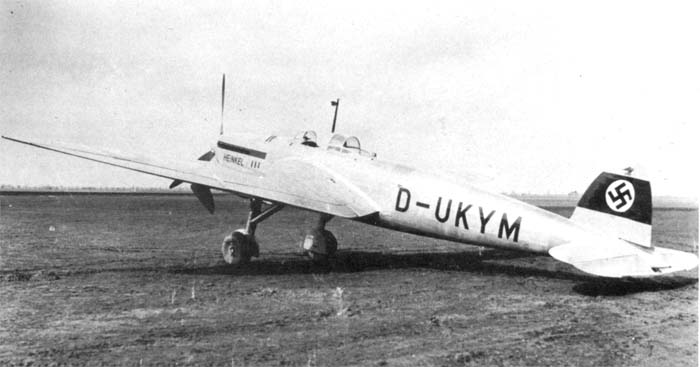

General information
- Type: Dive bomber
- National origin: Germany
- Manufacturer: Heinkel
- Designer: Siegfried and Walter Günter
- Number built: 15

History
- Developed from: Heinkel He 70

The Heinkel He 118 was a prototype German monoplane dive bomber design that lost out to the Junkers Ju 87 Stuka in the 1930s, and was never ordered by the Luftwaffe.

== Design ==
Designed by the Günter brothers, the He 118 followed many of the design notes of the Günter's designs of the era, notably the elliptical wing planform and rounded tail surfaces. It was in many ways an aluminum version of the mixed-construction Heinkel He 70 Blitz (Lightning), strengthened for dive bombing.

It was a conventional cantilever monoplane with an inverted gull wing of elliptical planform mounted midway up the fuselage. It was considerably more streamlined than the Junkers competitor, with retractable landing gear and an internal bomb bay.

As designed it was limited to filling a role similar to an attack bomber like the Henschel Hs 123 rather than a true dive bomber like the Junkers Ju 87. It was limited to bombing from a shallow angle, more properly known as "glide bombing", with the second crew member acting as the bomb aimer.

== Production and testing ==
In trials, it was discovered that the maximum dive angle was only 50°. In June 1936, Ernst Udet took the He 118 on a test flight but after commencing his first dive from about 13,000 feet the propeller suddenly feathered, shearing the reduction gears, and the He 118 disintegrated, leaving Udet to parachute to safety. The Ju 87 repeatedly demonstrated dives at 90 degrees with no trouble, and so won the contract.

Heinkel complained in his biography that Udet ignored instructions and flew the aircraft beyond its limits. He suggests that the failure doomed his design, in spite of being unable to dive vertically like the Stuka.

Of the 15 He 118s built, two went to Japan where they were designated DXHe. However, the aircraft disintegrated during Japanese flight tests. The 13-Shi (1939) design specification that led to the Yokosuka D4Y naval dive bomber may have been inspired by the He 118, but otherwise the two aircraft had little in common.

Heinkel used another example as a flying testbed for the Heinkel HeS 3 turbojet, with the jet engine slung under its fuselage. Although its pilot took off and landed using the He 118's piston engine, he started the turbojet engine in flight and flew under its power in July 1939, the first time an aircraft flew under jet power. The following month the similarly powered, fixed conventional landing gear-fitted Heinkel He 178 V1 would make the first flight powered entirely by a turbojet engine.

== Variants ==
- He 118 : Dive bomber prototypes.
- He 118A-1 : Eight production aircraft, powered by a 634 kW (850 hp) DB 600C engine.
- DXHe1: Two He 118s supplied to the Imperial Japanese Navy Air Service for evaluation in 1938.

== Operators ==
Japan

- Imperial Japanese Navy

== Specifications (He 118 V3) ==
Data from Die Deutsche Luftrüstung 1933–1945 Vol.2 – Flugzeugtypen Erla-Heinkel, and The warplanes of the Third Reich

General characteristics

- Crew: 2
- Length: 11.8 m (38 ft 9 in)
- Wingspan: 15 m (49 ft 3 in)
- Height: 3.1 m (10 ft 2 in)
- Wing area: 37.7 m^{2} (406 sq ft)
- Empty weight: 2,450 kg (5,401 lb)
- Gross weight: 3,775 kg (8,322 lb)
- Powerplant: 1 × Daimler-Benz DB 600C V-12 inverted liquid-cooled piston engine 880 PS (870 hp; 650 kW)

910 PS (900 hp; 670 kW) for take-off

- Propellers: 3-bladed constant-speed propeller

Performance

- Maximum speed: 394 km/h (245 mph, 213 kn) at 6,000 m (20,000 ft)
- Cruise speed: 335 km/h (208 mph, 181 kn) at 4,000 m (13,000 ft)
- Landing speed: 105 km/h (65 mph; 57 kn)
- Range: 1,250 km (780 mi, 670 nmi)
- Service ceiling: 8,500 m (27,900 ft)
- Time to altitude: 4,000 m (13,000 ft) in 13 minutes 12 seconds

Armament

- Guns: ** 2 × fixed forward-firing 7.92 mm MG 17 machine guns
  - 1 × flexible rearward-firing 7.92 mm (.323 in) MG 15 machine gun
- Bombs: 1x SC 500 or SC 250 bomb on underfuselge swinging crutch in an internal bomb bay.

== See also ==
Related development

- Junkers Ju 87
- Yokosuka D4Y

Related lists

- List of military aircraft of Germany
- List of military aircraft of Japan
