= Heinkel HeS 1 =

Experimental hydrogen jet engine

HeS 1
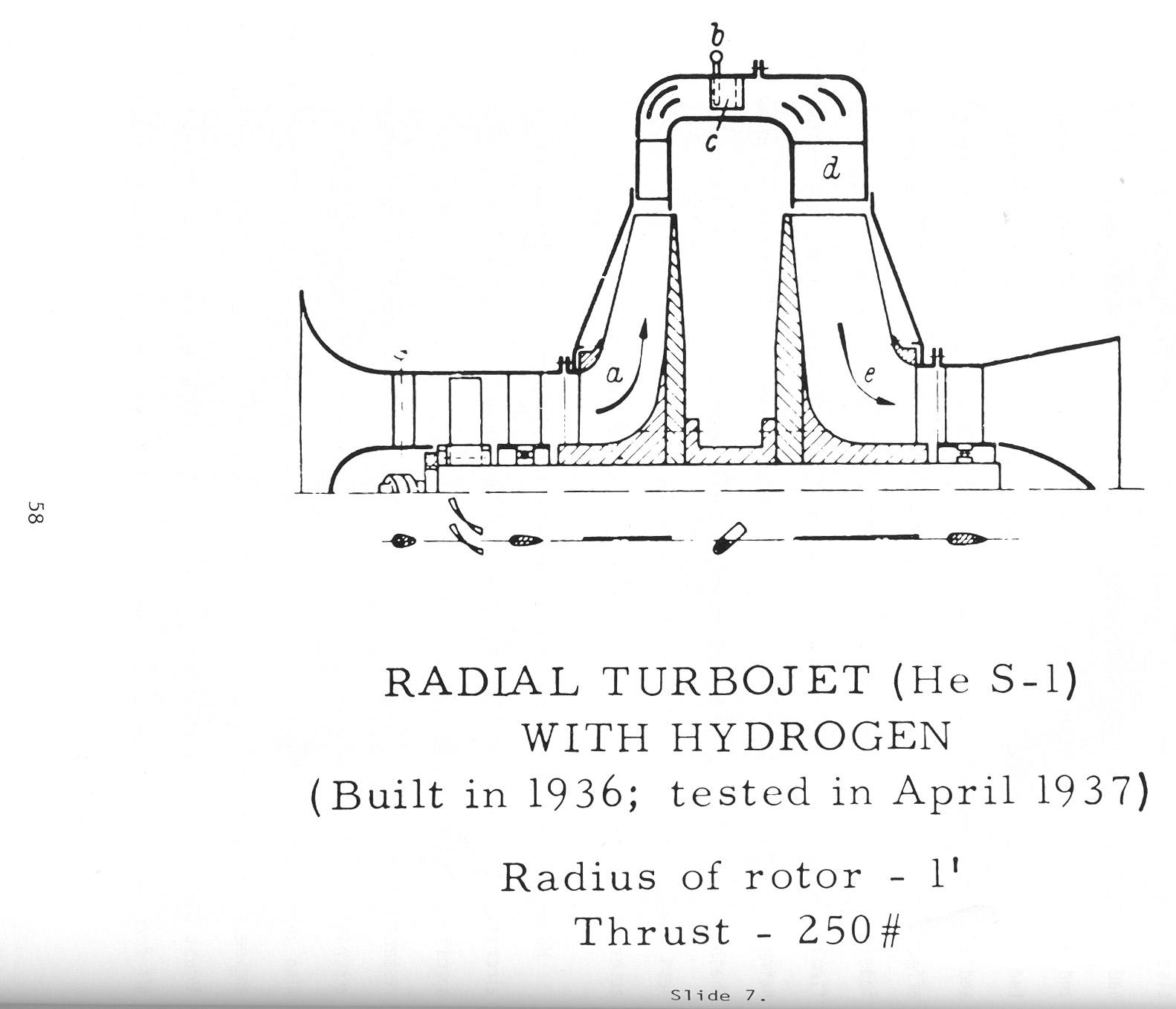
- Type: Engine
- National origin: Germany
- Manufacturer: Heinkel-Hirth Motorenbau
- Designer: Hans von Ohain
- First run: September 1937
- Manufactured: 1

The Heinkel HeS 1 (HeS - Heinkel Strahltriebwerke) was Germany's first jet engine, which was a stationary test item that ran on hydrogen.

== History ==
In 1933, Hans von Ohain wrote his PhD thesis at the University of Göttingen on the topic of an optical microphone that could be used to record sound directly to film. Siemens bought the patent for RM 3,500, a large sum.

Ohain used the money to invest in his real interest, the gas turbine. In 1934 von Ohain contracted his mechanic, Max Hahn, to build a prototype of his concept. Later referred to as the "garage engine", it quickly burned out due to the use of low-temperature metals. Nevertheless, it was successful and piqued the interest of his professor, Robert Pohl.

In February 1936, Pohl wrote to Ernst Heinkel on behalf of von Ohain, telling him of the design and its possibilities. Heinkel arranged a meeting where his engineers were able to grill von Ohain for hours, during which he flatly stated that the current "garage engine" would never work but there was nothing wrong with the concept as a whole. The engineers were convinced, and in April, von Ohain and Hahn were set up at Heinkel's works at the Marienehe airfield outside Rostock, Germany in Warnemünde.

Once moved, a study was made of the airflow in the engine, and several improvements made over a two-month period. Much happier with the results, they decided to produce a completely new engine incorporating all of these changes, running on hydrogen gas. The resulting Heinkel-Strahltriebwerk 1 (HeS 1), German for Heinkel Jet Engine 1, was built by hand-picking some of the best machinists in the company, much to the chagrin of the shop-floor supervisors. Hahn, meanwhile, worked on the combustion problem, an area he had some experience in.

The engine was extremely simple, made largely of sheet metal. Construction started late in the summer of 1936, and completed in March 1937. First run occurred in September 1937. Although the engine was never intended to be a flight-quality design, it proved beyond a doubt that the basic concept was workable.

While work on the HeS 1 continued, the team had already moved on to the design of a flight-quality design, the HeS 3.

== Bibliography ==
- Kay, Anthony L. (2002). German Jet Engine and Gas Turbine Development 1930–1945. The Crowood Press. ISBN 1-84037-294-X.
- Kay, Anthony L. (2007). Turbojet History and Development 1930–1960. Vol. 1. Ramsbury: The Crowood Press. ISBN 978-1-86126-912-6.
- Sterling Michael Pavelec, "The Jet Race and the Second World War", Greenwood, 2007, pg. 18–22
