= 1939 in aviation =

This is a list of aviation-related events from 1939:

== Events ==
- Kawasaki Heavy Industries transfers its aircraft engine production business to its subsidiary, the Kawasaki Aircraft Engineering Company.
- The Showa Aeroplane Company Ltd. begins to produce aircraft for the Imperial Japanese Navy at Showa, Japan.

=== January ===
- President Franklin D. Roosevelt asks the United States Congress to strengthen the air power of the United States, which he describes as "utterly inadequate."
- During flight testing, the prototype of the Imperial Japanese Army Air Force′s (IJAAF) Nakajima Ki-43 (Allied reporting name "Oscar") fighter displays poor takeoff and landing characteristics and proves to be far less maneuverable and only slightly faster than the fighter it is intended to replace, the Nakajima Ki-27 (Allied reporting name "Nate"). The IJAAF considers ending further development of the Ki-43, but its co-designer, Hideo Itokawa, convinces the IJAAF to allow him to redesign the aircraft.
- January 5 – Pioneering U.S. aviator Amelia Earhart is officially declared dead, eighteen months after her disappearance over the Pacific.
- January 7 – A Swissair Douglas DC-2-115B (registration HB-ITA) with 17 people on board strikes a hill near Senlis, France, while on approach to Paris-Le Bourget Airport and crashes, killing five of its occupants and seriously injuring four others.
- January 12 – The Royal Air Force's Auxiliary Air Force is formed.
- January 13
  - Northwest Airlines Flight 1, a Lockheed 14H Super Electra, crashes into a ravine shortly after takeoff from Miles City Municipal Airport in Miles City, Montana, killing all four people on board.
  - The Syndicato Condor Junkers Ju 52/3mge Marimba (registration PP-CAY) crashes into a mountain in the Serra do Sambé northeast of Rio de Janeiro, Brazil, and catches fire, killing all 10 people on board.
- January 21 – The Imperial Airways Short Empire flying boat Cavalier, tail number G-ADUU, flying from Port Washington, New York, to Bermuda with 13 people on board, ditches and sinks in the Atlantic Ocean southeast of New York City after icing causes its engines to fail. Three people on board die, but the commercial tanker Esso Baytown rescues the 10 survivors after they spend 10 hours in the water.
- January 26 – In the Spanish Civil War, Barcelona surrenders to Nationalist forces. In the days leading up to the surrender, Nationalist aircraft have raided the city continually, especially targeting ships in port to prevent them from saving Republican refugees from capture.
- January 29 – Karl Bode breaks the world altitude record for helicopters, flying a Focke-Wulf Fw 61 helicopter to an altitude of 3,427 meters (11,243 feet). It is the last official record set by a German helicopter produced prior to 1945.

=== February ===
- February 4 – The Boeing XB-15 prototype, assigned to the United States Army Air Corps 2nd Bombardment Group at Langley Field, Virginia, takes off under the command of Major Caleb V. Haynes to carry 3,250 pounds (1,470 kg) of American Red Cross emergency supplies to Santiago, Chile, in the wake of the 1939 Chillán earthquake. It arrives at Santiago only 30 hours later, making only two stops along the way, at France Field in the Panama Canal Zone, and at Lima, Peru. Haynes will receive the Distinguished Flying Cross and the Order of the Merit of Chile for the flight, and the XB-15's entire crew will receive the 1939 MacKay Trophy for it.
- February 9 – Alex Henshaw sets a new speed record of 4 days 10 minutes for the round trip between England and Cape Town in a Percival Mew Gull.
- February 11 – The Lockheed XP-38 falls 17 minutes short of the record for a flight across the United States, flying from March Field, California, to Mitchel Field, New York, in 7 hours 43 minutes. It loses power and crashes during its final approach at Mitchell Field, but its pilot is unhurt and the flight is considered an impressive demonstration of range and speed for a fighter.
- February 12 – Spanish Nationalist forces have 600 aircraft, compared to only 40 available on the Republican side.
- February 16 – The Spanish Republican Air Force reports that it has only 25 Polikarpov I-15 and I-16 fighters, two squadrons of Tupolev SB-2 bombers, and three squadrons of Polikarpov R-5 bombers.
- February 24 – A German Ministry of Aviation Junkers Ju 52/3mge (registration D-ALUS) taking German Condor Legion pilots who had fought in the Spanish Civil War home to Germany crashes into a mountain in Roubion, France, during a snowstorm, killing all 10 people on board. Its wreckage is not found until March 4.

=== March ===
- To improve coordination of aviation affairs within the United States Army, the United States Department of War places both General Headquarters Air Force (responsible for U.S. Army air combat operations) and the United States Army Air Corps (responsible for aviation logistics and training) under the command of the Chief of the Air Corps, Major General Henry H. Arnold.
- General der Flieger Albert Kesselring, commander of the Luftwaffe's Luftflotte 1, states that he doubts that even highly technically competent bomber crews can hit targets with any accuracy at night or in bad weather.
- March 7 – All American Aviation (the future All American Airways, Allegheny Airlines, USAir, and US Airways) begins operations, providing passenger and mail service.
- March 18 – During a test flight of a Boeing 307 Stratoliner (registration NX19901) at an altitude of 10,000 feet (3,000 meters), a KLM test pilot attempts a pre-approved test of the aircraft's flying characteristics at low speed with both engines on one side shut down. The Stratoliner stalls, goes into a spin, loses its wings and tail section, and crashes near Alder, Washington, killing all 10 people on board.
- March 25 – Ongoing ceasefire negotiations between Nationalist and Republican officials which include a Nationalist demand that all Spanish Republican Air Force aircraft fly to Nationalist airfields to surrender on this day are broken off when Republican aircraft do not surrender. A major motivation for the Nationalist demand is to prevent Republican leaders from fleeing Spain by air; six Republican aircraft carry officials and refugees from central Spain to France on this day.
- March 26 – Republican leader Segismundo Casado López telegraphs Nationalist leader Francisco Franco, announcing that the Spanish Republican Air Force will surrender to Nationalist forces the following day. Franco replies that Nationalist armies would advance on Republican territory anyway.
- March 30 – Hans Dieterle sets a new world air speed record in a Heinkel He 100 of 747.05 km/h (464.20 mph).

=== April ===
- The Seversky Aircraft Corporation changes its name to Republic Aviation.
- April 1
  - Nationalist leader Francisco Franco announces that the Spanish Civil War has ended in a complete Nationalist victory. During the 32½-month war, the Nationalists have used about 1,300 aircraft and the Republicans about 1,500; about 10,000 people have died in air attacks. Early Republican numerical air superiority had been challenged almost immediately by the technical superiority of Italian Fiat CR.32 fighters and Savoia-Marchetti SM.81, and German Junkers Ju 52 bomber-transports; Soviet Polikarpov I-15 and I-16 fighters had given the Republicans air superiority in the winter of 1936–1937, but the Nationalists had achieved lasting air superiority after German Messerschmitt Bf 109 fighters and Heinkel He 111 bombers and Italian Savoia-Marchetti SM.79 bombers had arrived in 1937. Germany has sent about 600 aircraft to Spain, Italy about 660, the Soviet Union 1,000, and other countries (principally France) about 350. The German, Italian, and Soviet air forces have learned a great deal about the employment of modern aircraft in warfare through their involvement, and the Luftwaffe's Condor Legion in particular has used the conflict to test new aircraft and revolutionary new air warfare concepts.
  - The Spanish Republican government airline LAPE ceases operations. The Franco government expropriates LAPE's aircraft and transfers them to the airline Iberia.
  - On the ninth anniversary of its founding, the Fieseler aircraft manufacturing company changes its name from Fieseler Flugzeugbau Kassel to the Gerhard Fieseler Werke GmbH.
- April 3 – The leading ace of the Spanish Civil War, the Nationalist pilot Joaquín García Morato y Castaño, dies when his Fiat CR.32 fighter crashes while he is performing low-level aerobatics for newsreel cameras. He had scored 40 victories during the war.
- April 26 – German Luftwaffe Flugkapitän Fritz Wendel sets a new world air speed record, reaching 755.59 km/h (469.50 mph) in the Messerschmitt Me 209 V1 racing aircraft. The German government will report that the record was set by an "Me 109R", a false designation used as part of a 1939 propaganda campaign to confuse other countries into thinking that the Me 209 is an advanced variant of the Messerschmitt Bf 109 fighter.
- April 28 – Vladimir Kokkinaki and Mikhail Godienko attempt a non-stop flight from the Soviet Union to New York but are forced down on Miscou Island in bad weather the next day.

=== May ===
- The Imperial Japanese Navy's air arm conducts the first Japanese bombing raid on Chongqing, China, an incendiary raid which causes huge fires and inflicts enormous casualties. Raids will increase in size and intensity over the next two years.
- The Hitachi Aircraft Company Ltd. is formed, with plants at Ōmori, Tachikawa, and Haneda, Japan.
- May 2 – An Air France Dewoitine D.338 (registration F-ARIC) encounters sudden icing conditions during a flight from Dakar, Senegal, to Casablanca, French Morocco, and crashes near Argana, French Morocco, killing all nine people on board.
- May 9 – Irish aviator Mary, Lady Heath, dies of injuries suffered in a fall aboard a double-decker tram in London.
- May 20 – Pan Am Boeing 314 flying boat Yankee Clipper inaugurates the world's first regular transatlantic air mail service, flying from Port Washington, New York, via Horta, Azores, and Lisbon to Marseille, France.
- May 22 – The German Condor Legion holds a farewell parade in León, Spain.
- May 24 – The Royal Navy takes practical control of British naval aircraft for the first time since the dissolution of the Royal Naval Air Service in 1918. British naval aircraft, since 1918 under Royal Air Force control and since 1924 known collectively as the "Fleet Air Arm of the Royal Air Force", officially become the Royal Navy's Air Branch, although the term "Fleet Air Arm" remains in widespread informal use and finally will be adopted officially in 1953.
- May 26 – German personnel of the Condor Legion depart Spain.
- May 31 – Italian forces, including the "legionary air force", depart Spain.

=== June ===
- June 1 – Oslo Airport, Fornebu, opens, replacing the former land and sea airports at Kjeller and Gressholmen respectively.
- June 4–21 – Led by the American zoologist and philanthropist Richard Archbold and carrying Australian Patrick Gordon Taylor as navigator, the PBY-2 Catalina flying boat Guba II makes the first flight across the Indian Ocean in history, flying from Port Hedland, Australia, to Mombasa, Kenya, via Batavia, Java; the Cocos (Keeling) Islands; Diego Garcia; and the Seychelles. Taylor leaves the crew in Mombasa, after which Archbold and the Guba II fly on to New York City, arriving there in July.
- June 6 – Adolf Hitler reviews 14,000 veterans of the Luftwaffe's Condor Legion in Berlin.
- June 13 – The United States Army conducts an exercise in the Territory of Hawaii in which 110 machine-gunners of Company D of the 19th Infantry Regiment move by truck on Oahu from Schofield Barracks to Hickam Field, board United States Army Air Corps B-18 Bolo bombers (manned by 33 men of the 31st Bombardment Squadron) along with their packs, guns, food and supplies and fly to Kauai, where they carry out maneuvers to simulate putting down an uprising. It is the first time in the United States and its territories that aircraft successfully transport fully equipped troops.
- June 16 – Air France commences hourly flights from Paris to London
- June 20 – First flight by Boeing 307 Stratoliner with cabin pressurization system active.
- June 22 – During the Khalkhin Gol Incident, a dogfight rages for 2½ hours between 120 Imperial Japanese Army aircraft and 95 Soviet Air Force fighters. The Soviets shoot down 31 Japanese aircraft in exchange for 11 of their own.
- June 24 – Pan Am Boeing 314 flying boat Yankee Clipper inaugurates the first regular transatlantic air mail service via the northern route from the United States to England, via Shediac (New Brunswick), Botwood (Newfoundland) and Foynes (Republic of Ireland).
- June 28
  - The United Kingdom's Women's Auxiliary Air Force is formed.
  - The Pan Am Boeing 314 flying boat Dixie Clipper inaugurates regular transatlantic flights with a departure from New York City bound for Marseille, France, via Horta, Azores, and Lisbon.
- June 29 – During another Khalkhin Gol Incident dogfight between Soviet and Japanese aircraft, the Soviets claim to have shot down 25 Japanese planes in exchange for the loss of two Soviet aircraft.

=== July ===
- Serving as a testbed for the Heinkel HeS 3 turbojet with the jet engine slung under its fuselage, a Heinkel He 118 dive bomber takes off and lands using its piston engine but flies under jet power after the turbojet is started in flight. It is the first time any aircraft makes any part of a flight under jet power, and the successful test leads to the first flight made completely under turbojet power by the Heinkel He 178 the following month.
- July 6
  - Soviet pilot Olga Klepikowa sets a world record by flying a glider 746 kilometers (464 miles) from Moscow to Otradnoye.
  - Eastern Air Lines inaugurates the world's first scheduled air mail service by a rotary-wing aircraft, an experimental service using a Kellett KD-1 autogiro to carry mail from the roof of the Philadelphia Post Office in Philadelphia, Pennsylvania, to the airport at Camden, New Jersey. The service will last about a year.
- July 8 – Pan Am Boeing 314 flying boat Yankee Clipper inaugurates the world's first heavier-than-air North Atlantic air passenger service between the United States (Port Washington, New York) and Britain (Southampton, England), carrying 17 passengers and the mail.
- July 13 – First Boeing 307 Stratoliner delivered, to Howard Hughes, which he intended to use for a round the world flight that would be cancelled with the outbreak of war in Europe.
- July 20 – In the Heinkel He 176, German pilot Erich Warsitz makes the first flight powered by a liquid-fuelled rocket.
- July 30 – Commanded by Major Caleb V. Haynes, the United States Army Air Corps Boeing XB-15 sets two payload-to-altitude world records in a single flight over Fairfield, Ohio, by carrying 14,135 kilograms (31,162 pounds) to an altitude of 2,000 meters (6,600 feet) and 10,000 kilograms (22,000 pounds) to an altitude of 8,228 feet (2,508 meters). Haynes will receive certificates from the National Aeronautics Association for an international record for "the greatest payload carried to an altitude of 2,000 meters."

=== August ===
- August 1 – During a flight in the Boeing Y1B-17A Flying Fortress from Dayton, Ohio, to St. Jacob, Illinois, United States Army Air Corps Captains Clarence Irvine and Pearl H. Robey set two official world records for an airplane with a 5,000 kg (11,023 lb) payload — for altitude, climbing to 10,371 meters (34,026 feet), and for speed over a distance of 1,000 km (621 mi), averaging 417.46 km/h (259.40 mph).
- August 2 – Under the command of Major Caleb V. Haynes, the U.S. Army Air Corps Boeing XB-15 sets a world record for speed over a closed circuit of 5,000 kilometers (3,107 miles) with a 2,000-kilogram (4,409-pound) payload, averaging 267.67 km/h (166.32 mph). During the same flight, it sets a U.S. national distance record for flight over a closed circuit of 3,129.241 miles (5,036.025 km).
- August 4 – The Deutsche Luft Hansa Junkers Ju 52/3mte Hans Wende (registration D-AUJG) crashes in the Serra de Llaberia near Tivissa, Spain, killing all seven people on board.
- August 11 – Pan American Airways (the future Pan American World Airways) begins scheduled flights from New York to Southampton, England.
- August 13 – A Pan American Sikorsky S-43B flying boat (registration NC16933) loses power in its left engine while circling Rio de Janeiro, Brazil, for a normal approach to Santos Dumont Airport. It enters a descending turn which becomes steeper until it strikes a caisson on Ilha das Cobras in Guanabara Bay and crashes, killing 14 of the 16 people on board.
- August 20 – Since the beginning of the Khalkhin Gol Incident on May 11, the Soviet Union has claimed 320 Japanese aircraft shot down and another 35 destroyed on the ground.
- August 22–30 – The Pan American Airways Boeing 314 flying boat California Clipper makes the airline's first flight to New Zealand since the crash of the Samoan Clipper in January 1938. The flight from San Francisco, California, to Auckland surveys a new route via Honolulu, Canton Island, and Nouméa, New Caledonia, replacing the previous route that had stops at Honolulu, Kingman Reef, and Pago Pago, American Samoa.
- August 26 – The Messerschmitt Me 209 V1 (registration D-INJR) sets a new world speed record of 755 km/h (469 mph), not officially broken by another piston-engined aircraft until 1969.
- August 24 – The Royal Air Force forms the Advanced Air Striking Force. Initially consisting of 10 squadrons of Fairey Battle bombers, its mission is to deploy to France in the event of war with Germany and strike targets in Germany from French bases.
- August 27
  - Flying the Heinkel He 178 V1, Erich Warsitz makes the first flight ever made entirely on turbojet power. The engine was designed by Hans von Ohain.
  - France and Germany close their airspace.
- August 28 – Two months after its creation, the United Kingdom's Women's Auxiliary Air Force mobilises in case war with Germany breaks out.
- August 29 – Swissair suspends flight operations due to foreign airspace closures and the mobilization of most of its employees for Swiss military service. It will gradually reintroduce some flights during the course of World War II until suspending them all again in August 1944.
- August 30 – The Deutsche Luft Hansa Junkers Ju 52/3mte Karl Hochmuth (registration D-AFOP) crashes just after takeoff from Hannover, Germany, killing all seven people on board.

=== September ===
- The Government of Egypt takes control of all routes operated by Misr Airlines, the future EgyptAir.
- September 1
  - World War II breaks out as Germany invades Poland. The Luftwaffe plays a key tactical bombing role in neutralising Polish defences, employing almost 1,600 aircraft against the Polish Air Force's 397. During the predawn hours of the day, a Luftwaffe Junkers Ju 87 "Stuka" dive bomber flown by Leutnant Frank Neubert of I Group, Sturzkampfgeshwader 2, scores the first aerial victory of World War II, shooting down a PZL P.11c fighter flown by Polish Captain Mieczysław Medwecki. Twenty minutes later, Medwecki's wingman, Second Lieutenant Wladyslaw Gnys, flying a PZL P.11c, scores probably the first Allied aerial victories of the war, shooting down two German Dornier Do 17E bombers of Kampfgeschwader 77 over Zurada, near Olkusz, Poland, although some authors have claimed that Polish antiaircraft artillery shot down the bombers.
  - The German Luftwaffe has 3,650 combat aircraft (1,170 bombers, 335 dive bombers, 1,125 single-engine fighters, 195 twin-engine fighters, 620 reconnaissance aircraft, and 205 coastal aircraft); a reserve force of between 10 and 25 percent of each of these types; and a training organization with 500 operational types used for operational training and 2,500 other training aircraft.
- September 2
  - In anticipation of war breaking out with Germany, the Royal Air Force's Advanced Air Striking Force deploys to bases around Rheims, France.
  - By the end of the day, the Luftwaffe has achieved virtually complete air superiority over Poland. It switches over to support of German Army ground forces for the rest of the Polish campaign, knocking out roads, railroads, and bridges – sometimes so effectively that the movement of Polish Army forces becomes impossible – and attacking Polish troop concentrations and destroying artillery and antiaircraft artillery units.
- September 3
  - The United Kingdom and France declare war on Germany.
  - Paratroops are used for the first time, with German units dropped into Silesia, behind Polish lines.
  - Royal Air Force Armstrong Whitworth Whitley bombers drop propaganda leaflets into German cities.
- September 4 – Bombing of Wilhelmshaven in World War II: The first British bombs of the war are dropped on German targets when a Bristol Blenheim of 110 Squadron attacks the German fleet. During the day, 30 Blenheims and Vickers Wellingtons attack the German ships, with seven of the bombers shot down. One of the Wellingtons mistakenly bombs Esbjerg in neutral Denmark, killing two people. They are the first civilians killed by Royal Air Force bombs in World War II.
- September 5 – President Franklin D. Roosevelt orders the United States Navy to organize a Neutrality Patrol to report and track any belligerent air, surface, or underwater naval forces approaching the United States East Coast or the West Indies.
- September 8 – Five French Air Force Curtiss H75 fighters engage a squadron of German Messerschmitt Bf 109s and shoot down two. They are the first French air-to-air victories of World War II, as well as the first by any of the Western Allies.
- September 15 – The Khalkhin Gol Incident concludes in a Soviet victory over the Imperial Japanese Army. In the final August 20 – September 15 Soviet offensive, the Soviet Air Force claims the destruction of another 290 Japanese aircraft, bringing the total Soviet claim since the beginning of the Incident on May 11 to 645 Japanese planes destroyed. The Soviets claim to have lost only 34 aircraft in the last two months of the conflict.
- September 17
  - The Soviet Union invades Poland.
  - The German submarine U-29 torpedoes and sinks the British aircraft carrier HMS Courageous with the loss of 518 lives while Courageous is conducting an antisubmarine patrol in the North Atlantic Ocean. The Fleet Air Arm's No. 811 and No. 822 Swordfish squadrons are completely destroyed in the sinking. The loss of Courageous results in the Royal Navy withdrawing aircraft carriers from antisubmarine operations.
- September 18 – Its bases in eastern Poland threatened by advancing Soviet forces, the Polish Air Force evacuates to Romania.
- September 19 – Germany halts construction of its second Graf Zeppelin-class aircraft carrier, Flugzeugträger B, while she still is on the building ways. Work on the ship never will be resumed.
- September 25
  - Nicola di Mauro of Italy sets a world seaplane altitude record of 13,542 meters (44,429 feet) in a Caproni Ca.161Idro. This record still stands for piston-engined seaplanes.
  - As Adolf Hitler looks on from a camouflaged bunker outside of the city, about 400 Luftwaffe bombers – some flying more than one sortie during the day – attack Warsaw, Poland, in conjunction with a German Army artillery bombardment, leaving the entire city ablaze. Its defenders surrender the next day.
- September 26 – Flying a No. 803 Squadron Blackburn Skua from HMS Ark Royal, Lieutenant B. S. McEwen of the Fleet Air Arm's No. 803 Squadron scores the first British victory over a German aircraft of World War II, shooting down a Dornier Do 18. German Heinkel He 111s attack Ark Royal in the North Sea later in the day, but score no hits.
- September 30 – A series of successful British trial flights to test the concept of using Short C-class flying boats refueled in mid-air by Handley Page Harrow tankers to carry airline passengers across the North Atlantic Ocean is terminated because of the onset of World War II.

=== October ===
- October 6 – The Polish campaign ends as Germany and the Soviet Union gain effective control over all of Poland. During the campaign, the Luftwaffe has lost 285 aircraft – 79 fighters, 78 bombers, 31 dive bombers, and 97 other aircraft – destroyed; 279 aircraft damaged; and 413 aircrew killed and 126 wounded. Poland has lost 333 aircraft.
- October 8 – The Royal Air Force scores its first aerial victory of World War II when a Lockheed Hudson shoots down a German Dornier Do 18 over Jutland.
- October 16 – The Luftwaffe attacks its first British targets, Royal Navy warships in the Firth of Forth.

=== November ===
- The Luftwaffe begins dropping sea mines around the British coastline.
- November 24 – The British Overseas Airways Corporation (BOAC) is formed by the merger of Imperial Airways and the original British Airways Ltd effective 1 April 1940.
- November 27 – British West Indian Airlines, the future BWIA West Indies Airways, is founded. It will begin flight operations one year later.
- November 30 – Soviet aircraft bomb Helsinki, Viipuri, and other cities in Finland from bases in Estonia, marking the outbreak of the Winter War between the Soviet Union and Finland. Soviet radio denies that Soviet aircraft bombed Finland, however, claiming that the Soviet Air Force had merely dropped bread to starving people in Helsinki, leading the Finns to refer to Soviet bombs as "Molotov's bread-baskets". The Soviets have about 800 aircraft committed to the war as it begins, while the entire Finnish Air Force includes only 96 planes, most of them obsolete; one month's worth of aviation gasoline; and a few batteries of antiaircraft artillery.

=== December ===
- The air arms of the Imperial Japanese Army and Imperial Japanese Navy conduct Operation 100, an effort to destroy a Chinese airbase crucial to the Soviet Union's supply of aircraft to the Nationalist Chinese. It fails to shut down the base or halt Soviet aircraft shipments.
- December 4 – Flying in bad weather, an Ala Littoria Junkers Ju 52/3mlu (registration I-BAUS) strikes a hillside near Bayerisch Eisenstein, Germany, at an altitude of about 1,000 meters (3,300 feet) during the final leg of a flight from Munich to Berlin and crashes, killing four of the 17 people on board.
- December 13 – A Fairey Seafox floatplane catapulted from the British light cruiser HMS Ajax spots fire for her guns while she fires on the German "pocket battleship" Admiral Graf Spee during the Battle of the River Plate. It is the first time in World War II that a ship-based seaplane spots gunfire for a Royal Navy ship and is considered a classic example of the use of a floatplane in such a role; the pilot, Lieutenant E. D. G. Lewin, receives the Distinguished Service Cross for the action. The Seafox goes on to conduct reconnaissance flights over the Admiral Graf Spee daily until her crew scuttles her on December 17.
- December 17 – The United Kingdom, Australia, Canada, and New Zealand institute the British Commonwealth Air Training Plan – known in some countries as the Empire Air Training Scheme – a massive joint military aircrew training program. South Africa participates via a parallel Joint Air Training Scheme agreement.
- December 18
  - Twelve out of 24 Royal Air Force Vickers Wellington bombers are shot down during a raid on German shipping off Wilhelmshaven, leading RAF Bomber Command to abandon daylight raids on Germany.
  - British anti-aircraft gunners on Gibraltar mistake a Spanish Iberia Junkers Ju 52/3gme airliner for an enemy aircraft and shoot it down. It crashes into the sea in the Strait of Gibraltar south of Europa Point, killing all 10 people on board.
- December 26 – The first Royal Australian Air Force squadrons to join the war arrive in Great Britain.

== First flights ==
- Savoia-Marchetti SM.87
- Stinson Voyager
- Yokosuka E14Y (Allied reporting name "Glen")

=== January ===
- Kawasaki Ki-45, prototype of Kawasaki Ki-45 Kai Toryu (Dragon Slayer; Allied reporting name "Nick")
- Early January – Nakajima Ki-43 Hayabusa ("peregrine falcon", Allied reporting name "Oscar")
- January 21 – Amiot 351.01, prototype of the Amiot 351
- January 27 – Lockheed XP-38, prototype of the P-38 Lightning

=== February ===
- February 18 – Martin XPBM-1, prototype of the Martin PBM Mariner

=== March ===
- Curtiss XP-42
- Seversky XP-41
- March 8 – Latécoère 611
- March 14 – Martin Model 167, prototype of the Martin Maryland
- March 26 – Cessna T-50, prototype of the Cessna AT-17 Bobcat
- March 31 – Miles M.9 Master production aircraft N7408

=== April ===
- Latécoère 570
- April 1 – Mitsubishi A6M Zero (Allied reporting name "Zeke")
- April 5 – Armstrong Whitworth Whitley IV
- April 7 – Potez 220
- April 11 – Henschel Hs 130
- April 22 – Aeronautica Umbra Trojani AUT.18 M.M.363

=== May ===
- May 7 – Petlyakov VI-100
- May 14 – Short Stirling prototype L7600
- May 15 – Fairchild M-62, prototype of the Fairchild PT-19
- May 21 – Ilyushin DB-3F, later redesignated as the Ilyushin Il-4 (NATO reporting name "Bob")
- May 25 – Henschel Hs 129

=== June ===
- Kokusai Ki-59 (Allied reporting name "Theresa")
- Mitsubishi Ki-51 (Allied reporting name "Sonia")
- June 1 – Focke-Wulf Fw 190
- June 27 – Dewoitine D.770

=== July ===
- Kawasaki Ki-48 (Allied reporting name "Lily")
- July 10
  - Dewoitine D.720
  - SNCAC NC.4-10
- July 11 – Marinens Flyvebaatfabrikk M.F.12
- July 17 – Bristol Beaufighter prototype R2052
- July 20 – Heinkel He 176, first aircraft powered by liquid-fuelled rocket
- July 21 – Short S.26 G-class flying boat G-AFCI Golden Hind
- July 25 – Avro Manchester prototype L7246

=== August ===
- Latécoère 570
- Nakajima Ki-49 Donryu ("Storm Dragon"), Allied reporting name "Helen"
- August 13 – Vickers Warwick
- August 27 – Heinkel He 178, first aircraft powered by turbojet

=== September ===
- Tachikawa Ki-55 (Allied reporting name "Ida")
- September 2 – Messerschmitt Me 210
- September 9 – Vultee 48, prototype of the P-66 Vanguard
- September 14
  - Bristol Bolingbroke
  - Sikorsky VS-300, the first helicopter to enter mass production
- September 26 – Levasseur PL.108
- September 28 – Bell YFM-1 Airacuda

=== October ===
- Saro A.37 Shrimp
- October 2 – Ilyushin TsKB-55
- October 23 – Mitsubishi G4M (Allied reporting name "Betty")
- October 25 – Handley Page Halifax H.P.57 prototype L7244, from RAF Bicester

=== November ===
- November 9 – Heinkel He 177
- Late November – Mitsubishi Ki-46 (Allied reporting name "Dinah")

=== December ===
- December 22 – Petlyakov Pe-2
- December 29 – Consolidated XB-24, prototype of the B-24 Liberator
- December 30 – Polikarpov I-190

== Entered service ==
- Hall PH-3 with the United States Coast Guard
- Polikarpov I-153 with the Soviet Air Forces
- Yokosuka H5Y (Allied reporting name "Cherry") with the Imperial Japanese Navy
- Mid-1939 – Saunders-Roe A.36 Lerwick with the Royal Air Force′s No. 240 Squadron

=== February ===
- Lockheed Hudson with No. 224 Squadron RAF

=== March ===
- Curtiss H75 with the 4th and 5th Escadre de Chasse, French Air Force
- March 29 – Curtiss YP-37 with the United States Army Air Corps

=== April ===
- Potez 661 with Air Afrique

=== August ===
- Miles Master

=== October ===
- Bristol Beaufort with No. 22 Squadron RAF (Coastal Command)

=== November ===
- November 15 – Bristol Bolingbroke with the Royal Canadian Air Force

=== December ===
- Boulton Paul Defiant with No. 264 Squadron RAF
- Sukhoi BB-1 (redesignated the Sukhoi Su-2 in 1942) with the Soviet Air Forces
- December 8 – Brewster F2A Buffalo with United States Navy

== Retirements ==
- Martin BM by the United States Navy
- July – Saro Cloud by the Royal Air Force
