= Latécoère 570 =

Military bomber aircraft

Latècoécre 570

General information
- Other name: Laté 570, Latecoere 570
- Type: Medium bomber
- National origin: France
- Manufacturer: Latécoère (La societe industrielle d'aviation Latécoère)
- Designer: Marcel Moine
- Flights: 1

History
- First flight: April 1939
- Retired: August 1939

The Latécoère 570 was a twin-engined medium bomber designed to a 1934 specification. It did not fly until 1939, by which time competitor aircraft had gone into service.

== Design and development ==
The Latécoère 570 was the French company's response to the specification of a four-seat bomber (B4) in the programme A-21 of November 1934. This called for an aircraft that could deliver, for example, a 1000 kg (2,200 lb) bomb load over a range of 1,500 km (940 mi), have a maximum speed of 400 km/h (250 mph) at about 4,000 m (1,200 ft) and to be able to reach this altitude in 15 minutes. The latest devices were specified, such as variable-pitch propellers, retractable undercarriage and retractable dorsal and ventral gun turrets. Nine manufacturers responded but only Latécoère and three others produced prototypes. These were the Amiot 341, the Lioré et Olivier LeO 45 and the Romano 120.

The Latécoère 570 was an aerodynamically clean, all-metal low cantilever wing monoplane with two radial engines and a twin tail. The wings were broad at the root and had straight edges, but narrowed continuously outwards to small-chord elliptical tips, mostly through the strong forward sweep of the trailing edge. This latter carried ailerons with flaps inboard. The two 1,125 hp (840 kW) Hispano-Suiza 14Aa engines were conventionally mounted on the forward wing spar with long-chord cowlings, driving variable-pitch propellers of opposite handedness. The engine fairings extended further rearwards below the wing than above to house the retracted undercarriage legs with their single wheels. The tailplane and elevator narrowed only slightly, ending with vertical surfaces that extended only upwards, unlike the typical endplate fins of the period which also reached below the tailplane. Both rudders and elevators had trim tabs.

The fuselage was a monocoque structure of roughly elliptical cross section with a flattened bottom. There was extensive glazing in the nose for the navigator/bomb aimer with the radio operator behind. The pilot's enclosed cockpit was slightly behind the leading edge of the wing and a long way behind the nose, restricting his view at take-off. Immediately behind him on the port side of the fuselage at mid-chord was a vertical bomb stack, filling the whole height of the fuselage. There was an access corridor down the starboard side, but another bomb could be mounted below its floor. There were also internal bomb mountings in the wing roots at this position. Behind this bomb bay and near the wing trailing edge was the upper (dorsal) SAM AB5 retractable turret with an Hispano 20 mm cannon; slightly further aft and at the trailing edge was a matching but inverted AB6 retractable ventral turret, similarly armed. The upper turret was manned by the fourth crew member and the lower one by the radio operator. A single jack extended and retracted these turrets together; the upper one was glazed to enable its gunner to keep watch even when it was retracted.

== Details ==
By July of 1939, Only one Latécoère 570 prototype was completed. It was never ordered into production because competing bombers, such as the Lioré et Olivier LeO 45 and the Amiot 351, had already entered service by the time the 570 was ready for testing.

The Latécoère 570 prototype took a long time to get into the air compared with its competitors. Construction began at Latécoère's Toulouse works from about April 1937, but during that year the Toulouse-Montaudran region was seriously disrupted by industrial action and it was decided to complete the aircraft at the Bayonne factory. It finally flew in until August 1939, piloted by Yves Lascombe. The 570 went for trials at CEMA d'Orleans-Bricy early in 1940, though by then the Amiot 351 and Lioré et Olivier LeO 45 were already in service. It was found to have good flying characteristics, though its performance vis-à-vis the other B4 machines was somewhat disappointing. The 14Aa engines were by this time performing reliably, despite an unhappy beginning in the other B4 prototypes. By June 1940 the sole 570 was in German hands at Bricy, but not judged worth flying.

== Specifications ==
Data from Cuny 1992, pp. 257

General characteristics

- Crew: 4
- Length: 18.80 m (61 ft 8 in)
- Wingspan: 23.40 m (76 ft 9 in)
- Height: 6.51 m (21 ft 4 in)
- Wing area: 78 m^{2} (840 sq ft)
- Empty weight: 5,841 kg (12,877 lb)
- Gross weight: 10,080 kg (22,223 lb)
- Powerplant: 2 × Hispano-Suiza 14Aa-04/05 14-cylinder two row radial , 840 kW (1,125 hp) each at around 3,000 m (9,800 ft)

Performance

- Maximum speed: 469 km/h (291 mph, 253 kn) at 5,000 m (16,000 ft)
- Range: 2,000 km (1,243 mi, 1,080 nmi)
- Service ceiling: 8,800 m (28,871 ft)
- Rate of climb: 6.50 m/s (1,280 ft/min) to 5,000 m (16,000 ft)

Armament

- 1× 20 mm (0.79 in) Hispano HS9 cannon in dorsal retractable turret
- 1× 20 mm (0.79 in) Hispano HS9 cannon in ventral retractable turret
- up to 2,100 kg (4,630 lb) of bombs (individual maximum 500 kg (1,100 lb)) according to mission range
