= Amiot 354 =

1940 bomber aircraft family by Amiot

354
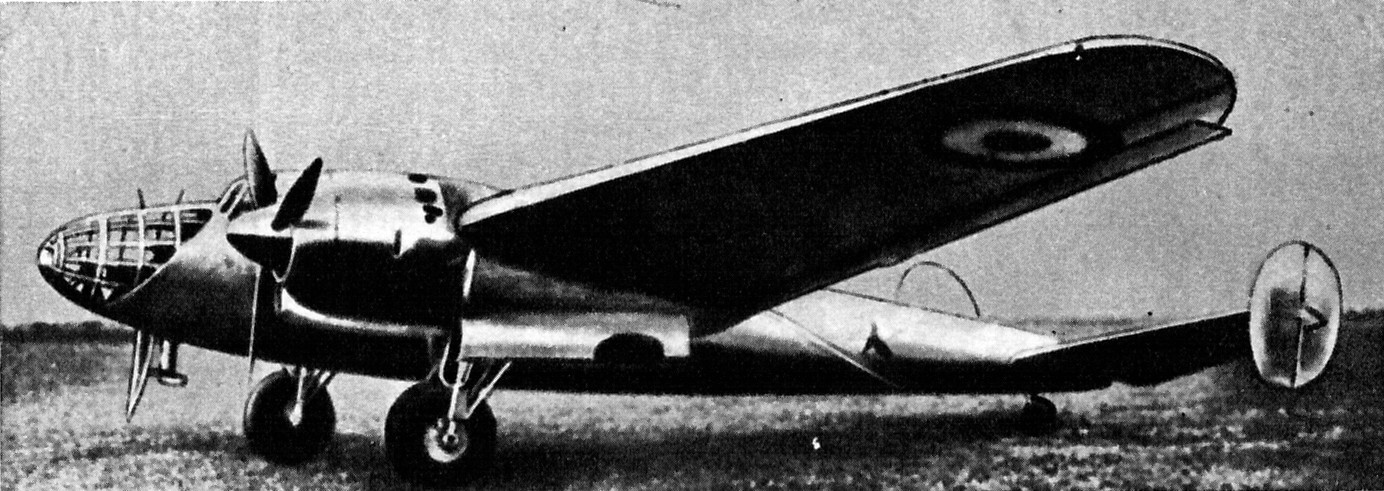
- Amiot 351

General information
- Type: Bomber
- Manufacturer: Avions Amiot
- Primary users: French Air Force Luftwaffe
- Number built: ca. 86

History
- Introduction date: 1940
- First flight: November 1939

The Amiot 354 was the last in a series of fast, twin-engine bombers which fought with the French Air Force in limited numbers during the Battle of France.

== Development ==
Amiot 351

In August 1933, the Armée de l'Air (French Air Force) issued a requirement for a reconnaissance bomber (Bombardement Combat Renseignement - BCR). Amiot initially planned to submit the Amiot 144, a derivative of its Amiot 143 bomber with a retractable undercarriage, but soon realised that to deliver the required performance, an entirely new design was needed, and this was developed into the Amiot 340 BR3, a twin-engined aircraft with a crew of three which promised a speed of 470 km/h (290 mph; 250 kn) when using Hispano-Suiza 12Y or Gnome-Rhône 14N engines. A mock-up of the Amiot 340 was inspected in March 1936, which resulted in an order for a single prototype being placed, while a four-seat version, the Amiot 341 B4 was planned to better meet the Armée de l'Air's needs. Simultaneous with the development of the Amiot 340, Amiot was also instructed to design and build a civil version to compete in a planned trans-Atlantic air race to commemorate the 10th anniversary of Charles Lindbergh's first solo trans-Atlantic flight. The mock-up of the Amiot 340 was modified to represent this civil version and was exhibited at the 1936 Paris Air Show as a long range fast postal aircraft, under the designation Amiot 341, but the civil version was completed as the Amiot 370.

The Amiot 370 was first to fly, at Istres on 25 July 1937. It was powered by two liquid-cooled 860 hp (640 kW) Hispano-Suiza 12Yjrs/Ykrs engines, which gave a maximum speed of 475 km/h (295 mph; 256 kn), with an estimated range of 7,000 km (4,300 mi; 3,800 nmi) cruising at 400 km/h (250 mph; 220 kn). The Amiot 340 prototype, designated Amiot 340.01, was completed in early 1937. While the French Air Ministry had specified use of Hispano-Suiza 14AA radial engines for the 340, as also required for the competing Lioré et Olivier LeO 45, Romano R.120 and Latécoère 570, poor reliability of these engines resulted in them being replaced by 960 hp (720 kW) Gnome-Rhône 14P engines. In this form, the Amiot 340.01 first flew on 6 December 1937. It was re-engined with 920 hp (690 kW) Gnome-Rhône 14N0/N1 engines in February 1938. The prototype was delivered to the French test centre at Villacoublay airfield in March 1938, and after an initial period of testing, was returned to Amiot for modification, being fitted with 1,025 hp (764 kW) Gnome-Rhône 14N20/N21 engines. In August 1938, it was used by the French Chief of Air Staff General Joseph Vuillemin to carry out an official visit to Germany, with two seats being fitted in the aircraft's bomb bay to allow it to carry out this mission. On 16 August, it flew from Villacoublay to Berlin at an average cruise speed of 440 km/h (270 mph; 240 kn) and altitude of 4,200 m (13,800 ft).

After returning from Germany, the prototype underwent another series of modifications, converting the aircraft to the preferred four-seat configuration, with a twin tail to improve the field of fire for its dorsal cannon. It first flew in its new form on 21 January 1939, with the new designation Amiot 351.01. Testing of the prototype revealed problems with the aircraft's undercarriage and lateral stability. The prototype was damaged in a landing accident, blamed on faulty brakes, on 4 July 1939. By the time the prototype was repaired, in September 1939, the first two production aircraft were about to be delivered, and it was decided to convert the prototype to a four-seat reconnaissance aircraft, refitting the original single tail and becoming the Amiot 351.01 A4.

Production orders for the Amiot began to be placed in May 1938, as part of the French Air Ministry's newly issued Plan V, with 20 aircraft ordered on 27 May 1938, followed by an order for a further 100 aircraft three weeks later. Deliveries were expected to start by April 1939, and were to reach a rate of 20 aircraft per month. Amiot proposed a number of versions of its new bomber, varying mainly on the engines used, and whether a single or twin tail was fitted, and the numbers of each version to be built frequently changed. The production aircraft had a shorter wingspan compared with the prototype, and a longer fuselage. Its crew of four consisted of a bomb-aimer/navigator in the aircraft's nose, a pilot and dorsal gunner under a long canopy on the aircraft's centreline and a radio operator in the rear fuselage. A 20 mm (0.79 in) Hispano-Suiza HS.404 cannon was fitted in the dorsal position, with 7.5 mm (0.295 in) MAC 1934 machine gun in the nose and ventral positions. Up to 1,200 kg (2,600 lb) of bombs could be carried in a bomb bay.

Production delays and modifications ensured that by September 1939 none had been delivered. 830 of this very modern aircraft were eventually ordered but only 80 machines were received by the Air Ministry. The main variant was the twin-tailed 351; due to delays, the single-tailed Amiot 354 was accepted into service as an interim type. Due to technical problems with the armament installation, many aircraft went to operational units with only a rifle-calibre machine-gun in the dorsal position.

== Operational history ==
In May 1940, the Amiot 351/354 was in the process of equipping just two bomber groupes: GB 1/21 and GB II/21 based at Avignon. Though 200 were in the final stages of construction, only 35 were ready for flight. This situation was exacerbated by the Amiot 351/354 being built in three factories, two of which were later bombed by the Germans. On 16 May 1940, the Amiot 351/354s carried out armed reconnaissance sorties over Maastricht in the Netherlands - the first operation conducted by planes of this type. By June, the Amiot 351/354 was also delivered for GB I/34 and GB II/34, neither flying them in combat. At that time, all Amiot 351/354s were based on the northern front. Three had been lost in combat and ten in training accidents. All aircraft were ordered to evacuate to Africa on 17 June, 37 surviving the trip. As their numbers were too few to engage the Italians, the aircraft were sent back to Metropolitan France and their groupes disbanded in August 1940. Five Amiot 351/354s continued to be used as mail planes after the Battle of France. Four Amiot 351/354s were commandeered by the Luftwaffe as transports, two found service in the 1./Kampfgeschwader 200 a special service unit. Engines taken from these aircraft were later used on Messerschmitt Me 323 cargo transports.

== Variants ==
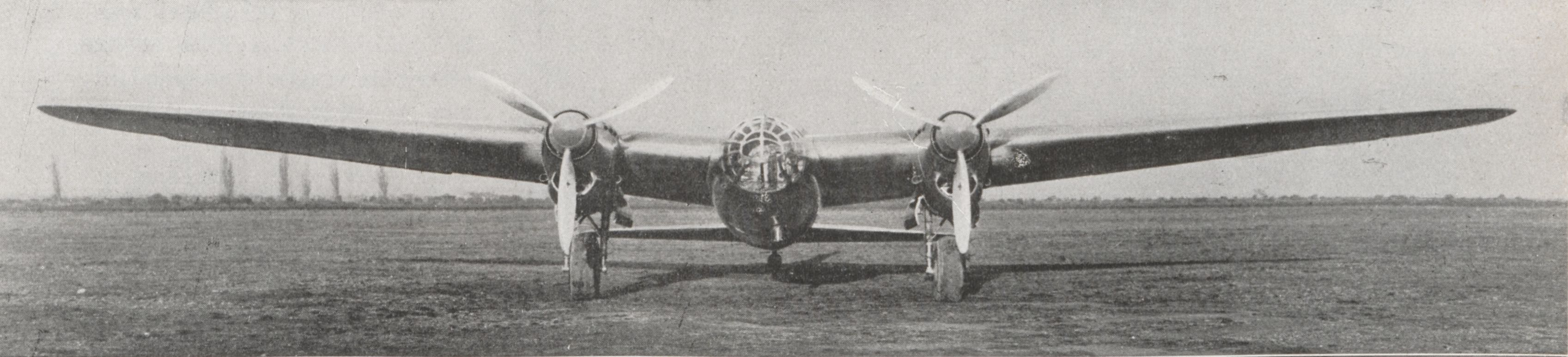
Amiot 350 with Hispano-Suiza 12Y 28/29 engines.

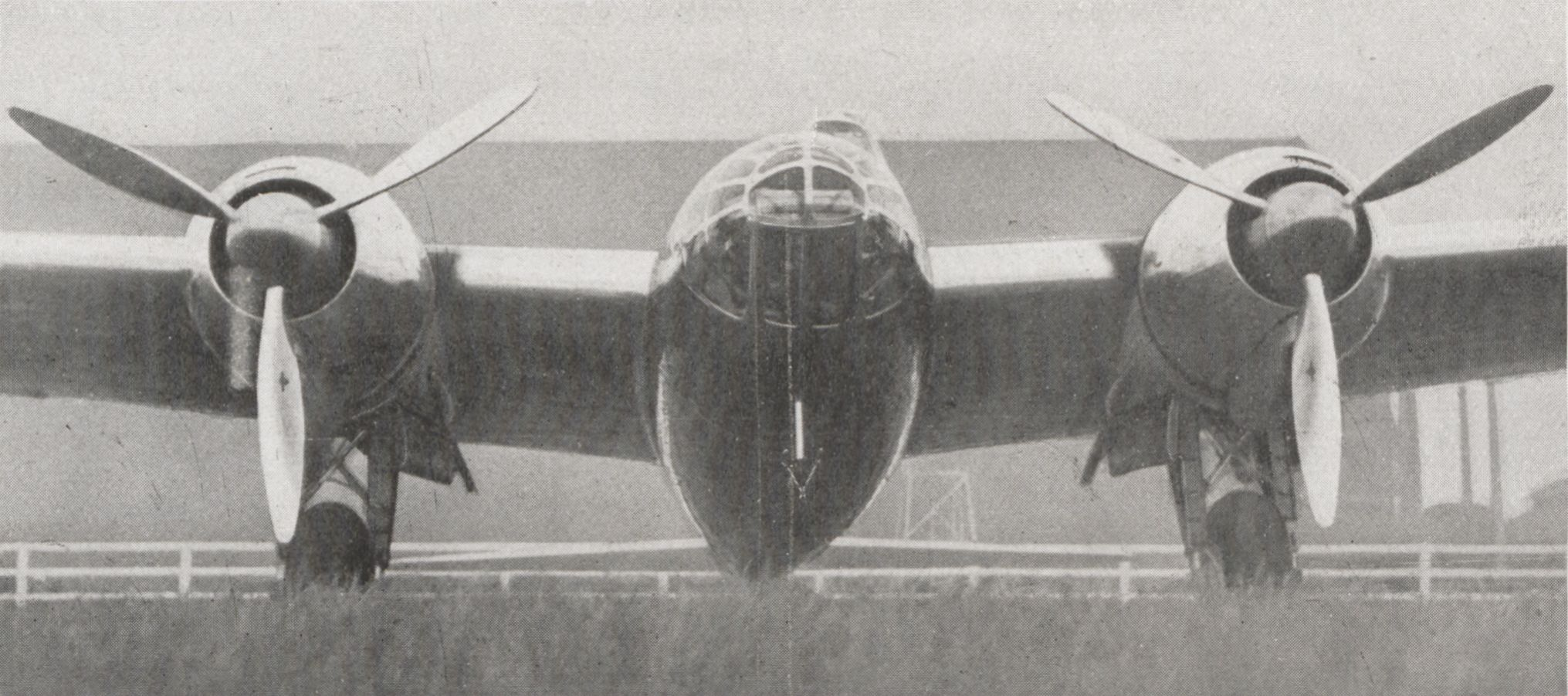
Amiot 351 with Gnome-Rhône 14N engines.

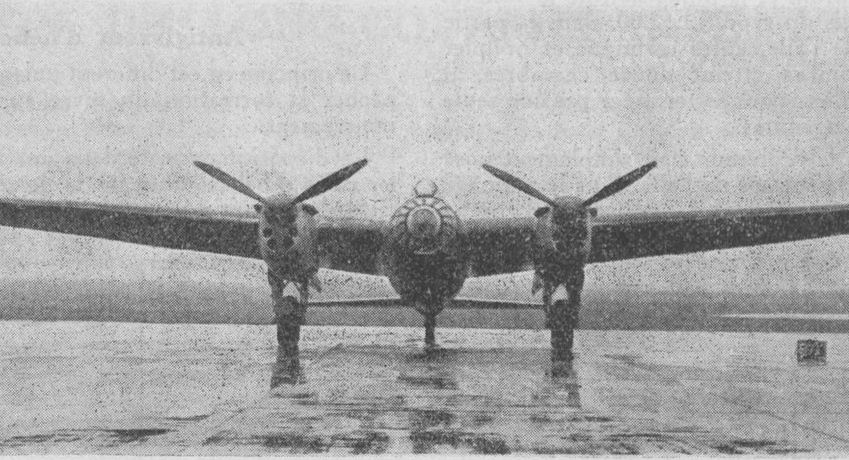
Amiot 356 with Rolls-Royce Merlin X engines.

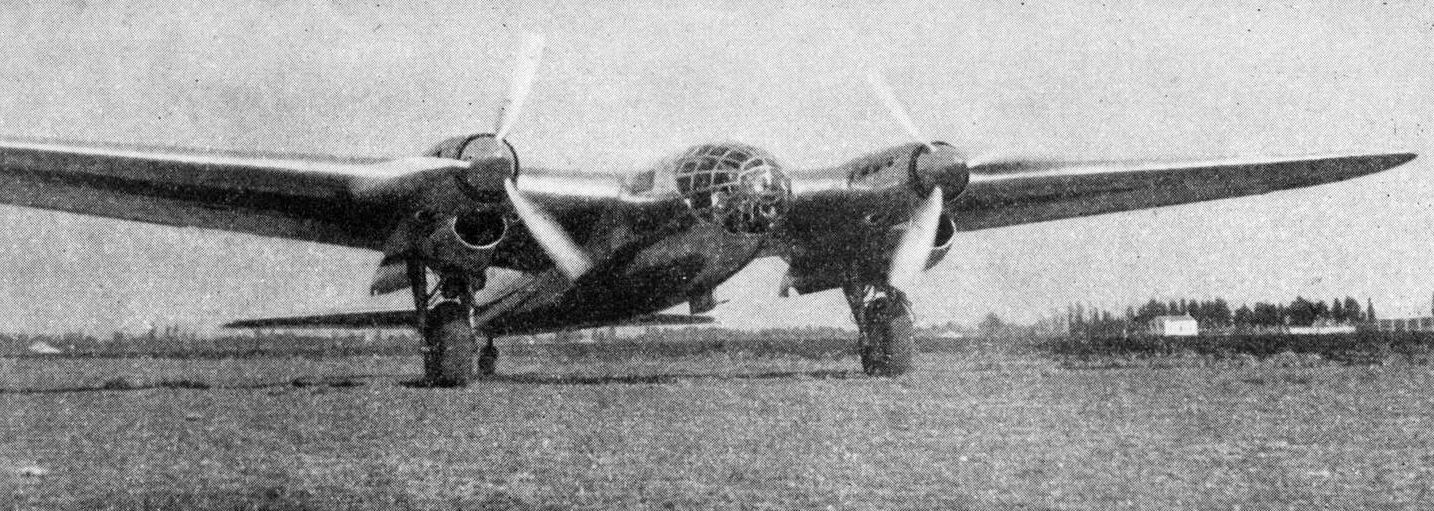
Amiot 370 with Hispano-Suiza 12 Yirs/Yjrs engines.

Amiot 340.01
First prototype. Three seat bomber powered by two 960 hp (720 kW) Gnome-Rhône 14P redial engines and fitted with single tail. One built.

Amiot 350
351 re-engined with two 686 kW (920 hp) Hispano-Suiza 12Y-28 / Hispano-Suiza 12Y-29 engines (one built)

Amiot 351.01
Amiot 351 prototype.

Amiot 351
Two 707 kW (950 hp) Gnome-Rhône 14N-38 / Gnome-Rhône 14N-39, twin-tail (17) (This number may be low)

Amiot 352
351 re-engined with two 820 kW (1,100 hp) Hispano-Suiza 12Y-50 / Hispano-Suiza 12Y-51 engines (one built)

Amiot 353
351 re-engined with two 768 kW (1,030 hp) Rolls-Royce Merlin III engines (one built)

Amiot 354
351 re-engined with two 798 kW (1,070 hp) Gnome-Rhône 14N-48 / Gnome-Rhône 14N-49, most with single-tail. (45) (This number is probably low)

Amiot 355.01
351 re-engined with two 895 kW (1,200 hp) Gnome-Rhône 14R-2 / Gnome-et-Rhone 14R-3 engines (one built)

Amiot 356.01
354 re-engined with two 842 kW (1,130 hp) Rolls-Royce Merlin X engines (one built)

Amiot 357
high-altitude prototype with pressurized cabin, two 895 kW (1,200 hp) Hispano-Suiza 12Z-89 turbocharged engines (one built)

Amiot 358
351 re-engined post-war with two 895 kW (1,200 hp) Pratt & Whitney R-1830 engines (one built)

Amiot 370
single-tail racer with two 642 kW (860 hp) Hispano-Suiza 12Yirs / Hispano-Suiza 12Yjrs engines, developed specifically for (later cancelled) Paris-New York race (one built)

== Operators ==
France

- Armee de l'Air

Vichy France

- Vichy French Air Force

Nazi Germany

- Luftwaffe

== Specifications (Amiot 354 B4) ==
Data from War Planes of the Second World War: Volume Seven Bombers and Reconnaissance Aircraft

General characteristics

- Crew: 4 (pilot, co-pilot, navigator, bombardier)
- Length: 14.5 m (47 ft 7 in)
- Wingspan: 22.83 m (74 ft 11 in)
- Height: 4.08 m (13 ft 5 in)
- Wing area: 67 m^{2} (720 sq ft)
- Airfoil: E7
- Empty weight: 4,735 kg (10,439 lb)
- Gross weight: 11,324 kg (24,965 lb)
- Powerplant: 1 × Gnome-Rhône 14N-48 14-cylinder two-row air-cooled radial piston engine, 791 kW (1,060 hp) for take-off (RH rotation fitted to port)
- Powerplant: 1 × Gnome-Rhône 14N-49 14-cylinder two-row air-cooled radial piston engine, 791 kW (1,060 hp) for take-off (LH rotation fitted to starboard)
- Propellers: 3-bladed variable-pitch propellers

Performance

- Maximum speed: 480 km/h (300 mph, 260 kn) at 4,000 m (13,000 ft)
- Cruise speed: 349 km/h (217 mph, 188 kn)
- Range: 3,500 km (2,200 mi, 1,900 nmi)
- Service ceiling: 10,000 m (33,000 ft)
- Time to altitude: 4,000 m (13,000 ft) 8 minutes 42 seconds

Armament

- Guns: 3 × 7.5 mm (0.295 in) MAC 1934 machine guns or 2 × 7.5 mm (0.295 in) MAC 1934 machine guns and 1 × 20 mm (0.787 in) cannon
- Bombs: 1,200 kg (2,646 lb)

== See also ==
Aircraft of comparable role, configuration, and era

- Douglas DB-7
- Martin Maryland
- Lioré et Olivier LeO 45
- SNCAC NC.150

Related lists

- List of aircraft of World War II
- List of aircraft of the French Air Force during World War II
- List of bomber aircraft

== Bibliography ==
- Cuny, Jean & Danel, Raymond. LeO 45, Amiot 354 et autres B4. Docavia 23, éditions Larivière, 1986. (Mainly chapter IV p 241-336, in French).
- Breffort, Dominique & Jouineau, André. French Aircraft from 1939 to 1942
- Curnel, J. (October 1972). "Les Amiot 340, 350, 370 (1)". L'Album du Fanatique de l'Aviation (in French). No. 37. pp. 2–6. ISSN 0757-4169.
- Curnel, J. (November 1972). "Les Amiot 340, 350, 370 (2)". L'Album du Fanatique de l'Aviation (in French). No. 38. pp. 2–6. ISSN 0757-4169.
- Curnel, J. (December 1972). "Les Amiot 340, 350, 370 (3)". L'Album du Fanatique de l'Aviation (in French). No. 39. pp. 2–5. ISSN 0757-4169.
- Curnel, J. (January 1973). "Les Amiot 340, 350, 370 (4)". L'Album du Fanatique de l'Aviation (in French). No. 40. pp. 2–6. ISSN 0757-4169.
- Curnel, J. (February 1973). "Les Amiot 340, 350, 370 (5)". L'Album du Fanatique de l'Aviation (in French). No. 41. pp. 2–6. ISSN 0757-4169.
- Curnel, J. (March 1973). "Les Amiot 340, 350, 370 (6)". L'Album du Fanatique de l'Aviation (in French). No. 42. pp. 2–5. ISSN 0757-4169.
- Green, William (1967). War Planes of the Second World War: Volume Seven Bombers and Reconnaissance Aircraft. London: Macdonald.
- Green, William; Swanborough (September–December 1987). "The Ambitious Amiot". Air Enthusiast. No. 34. pp. 65–78. ISSN 0143-5450.
- Weal, Elke C., Weal, John A., Barker, Richard F. Combat Aircraft of World War Two
- Various issues of Avions magazine
