= Hispano-Suiza 14AA =

1930s French radial aircraft engine

14AA
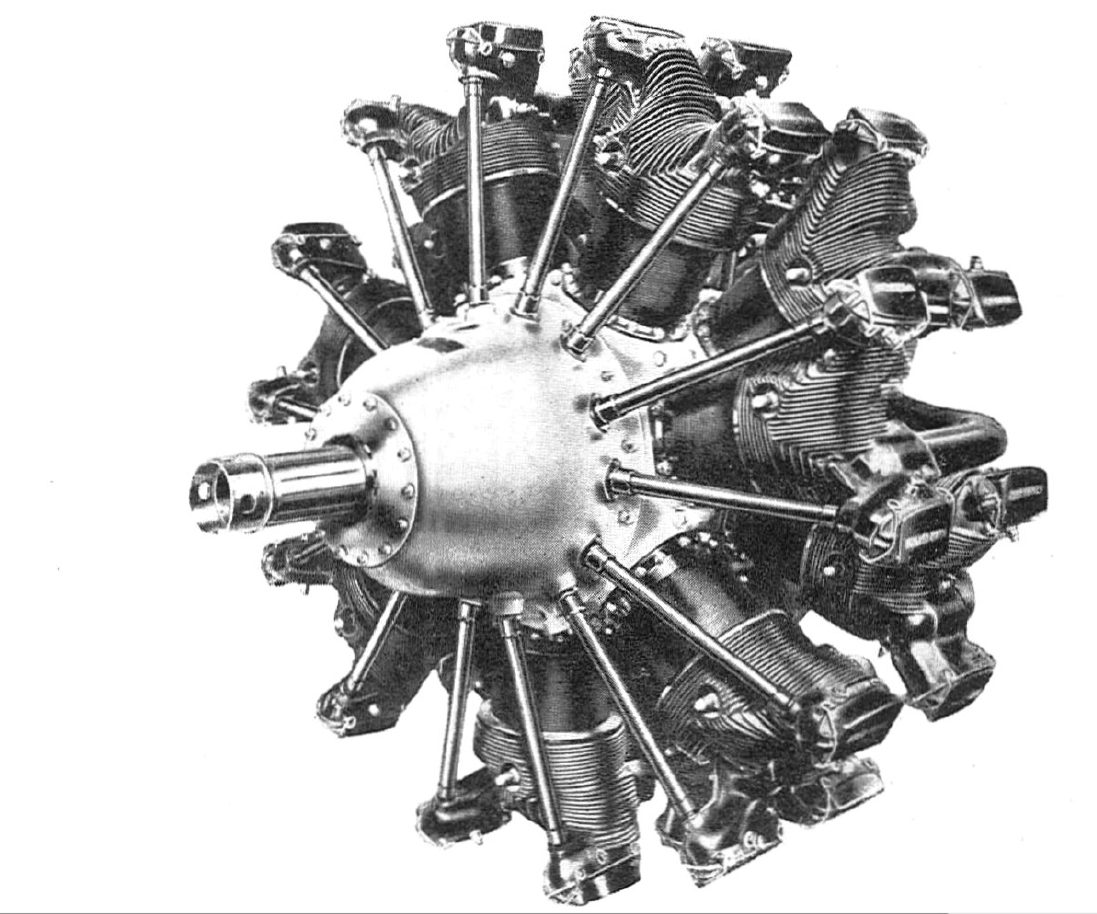
- Type: Radial engine
- Manufacturer: Hispano-Suiza
- First run: 1930s
- Developed from: Wright R-2600

The Hispano-Suiza 14AA, also known as Type 79, was a fourteen-cylinder aircraft radial engine used in France during the late 1930s. As Hispano-Suiza lacked recent experience in developing radial engines, it was derived from the licensed Wright R-2600 engine. Due to reliability problems, the engine was largely supplanted by the similar Gnome-Rhône 14N.

It is not to be confused with the smaller Hispano-Suiza 14AB, which was derived from the smaller Wright Whirlwind series.

== Variants ==
14AA-00
Direct drive LH rotation
14AA-01
Direct drive RH rotation as -00
14AA-02
0.625:1 reduction gear LH rotation
14AA-03
0.625:1 reduction gear RH rotation as -02
14AA-04
0.625:1 reduction gear LH rotation
14AA-05
0.625:1 reduction gear RH rotation as -04
14AA-06
Direct drive LH rotation
14AA-07
Direct drive RH rotation as -06

== Applications ==
- Amiot 341
- LeO 45
- Farman F.223
- Latécoère 530
- Latécoère 570
- Koolhoven F.K.58
- Potez 501
- Romano R.120

== Specifications (14AA-04) ==
Data from Tsygulev.

=== General characteristics ===
- Type: Fourteen-cylinder two-row supercharged air-cooled radial engine
- Bore: 155,6 mm (6.126 in)
- Stroke: 170 mm (6.693 in)
- Displacement: 45.257 L (2,761 in^{3})
- Length: 1,650 mm (64.96 in)
- Diameter: 1,260 mm (49.61 in)
- Dry weight: 640 kg (1,411 lb)

=== Components ===
- Valvetrain: Overhead valves
- Supercharger: Single-speed centrifugal type supercharger, 10.0:1 reduction
- Fuel system: Carburetor
- Fuel type: 85-87 octane rating gasoline
- Cooling system: Air-cooled
- Reduction gear: 1.58:1

=== Performance ===
- Power output: 793 kW (1,063 hp) at 2,125 rpm for takeoff
- Specific power: 17.52 kW/L (0.39 hp/in^{3})
- Compression ratio: 6.2:1
- Specific fuel consumption: 369 g/(kW•h) (0.61 lb/(hp•h))
- Oil consumption: 12 g/(kW•h) (0.32 oz/(hp•h))
- Power-to-weight ratio: 1.24 kW/kg (0.75 hp/lb)

== See also ==
Related lists

- List of aircraft engines
