= Lioré et Olivier LeO 45 =

French medium bomber (1938–1957)

Lioré et Olivier LeO 451
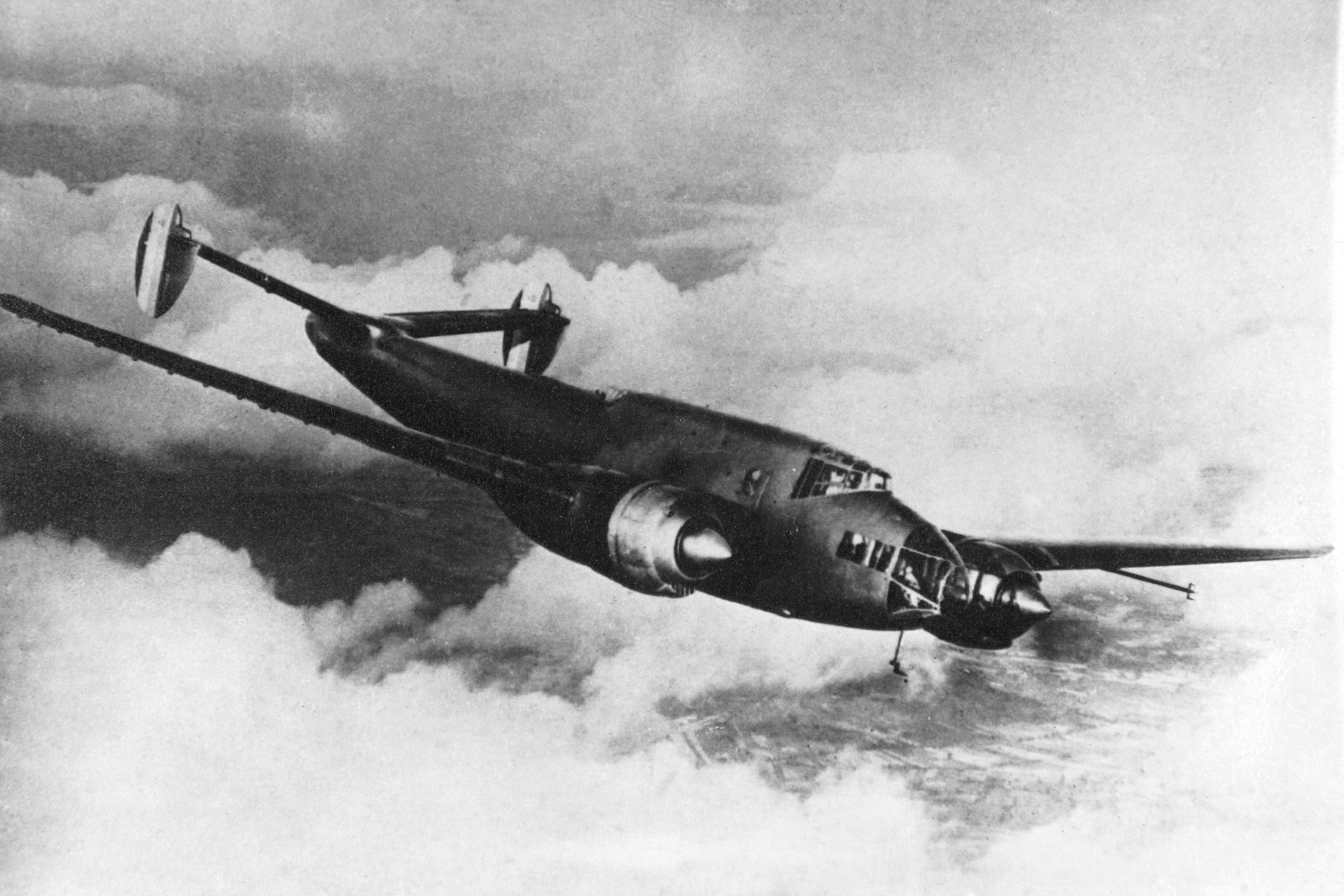
- Lioré et Olivier LeO 451

General information
- Type: Medium bomber
- Manufacturer: SNCASE, SNCAO
- Status: Retired
- Primary user: French Air Force
- Number built: 561

History
- Manufactured: 1938–1942
- Introduction date: 1938
- First flight: 16 January 1937
- Retired: 1957

Lioré-et-Olivier LeO 45 was a French medium bomber that was used during and after the Second World War. It had been designed for the new Armée de l'air as a modern medium bomber capable of performing independent strategic operations, unlike the majority of previous French bombers.

The LeO 45 was a low-wing monoplane, all-metal in construction, equipped with a retractable undercarriage and powered by two 1,060 hp Gnome-Rhône 14N engines. The prototype, which made its maiden flight on 16 January 1937, had been fitted two 1,100 hp Hispano-Suiza engines. The LeO 45 had been developed as a modern and advanced bomber for the new Armée de l'air, which had gained its independence on 1 April 1933. Introduced to operational service in 1938, it was a very effective and capable bomber.

As only a handful of aircraft had been introduced into the French Air Force by the outbreak of the Second World War, the LeO 45 was too late to provide a substantial contribution during the Battle of France in the face of an invasion by Nazi Germany. As a result of the Armistice of 22 June 1940, the type continued to be manufactured and operated by occupied Vichy France as Free France forces operated the aircraft. The LeO 45 participated in combat missions throughout the remainder of the war and continued to be used for some time after its end by the post-war French Air Force. The last examples in active service were retired in September 1957.

== Development ==
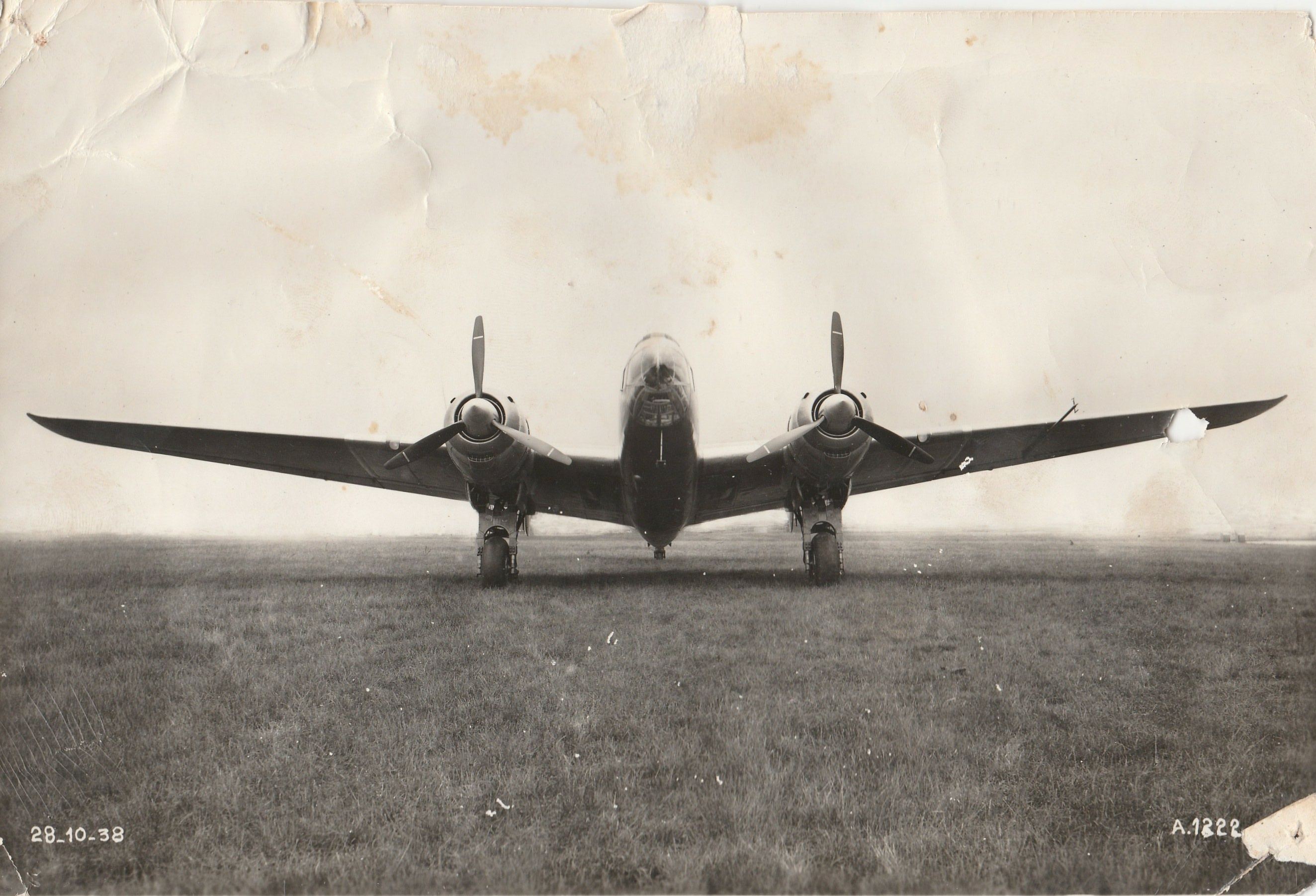
Front view of the LeO 45.

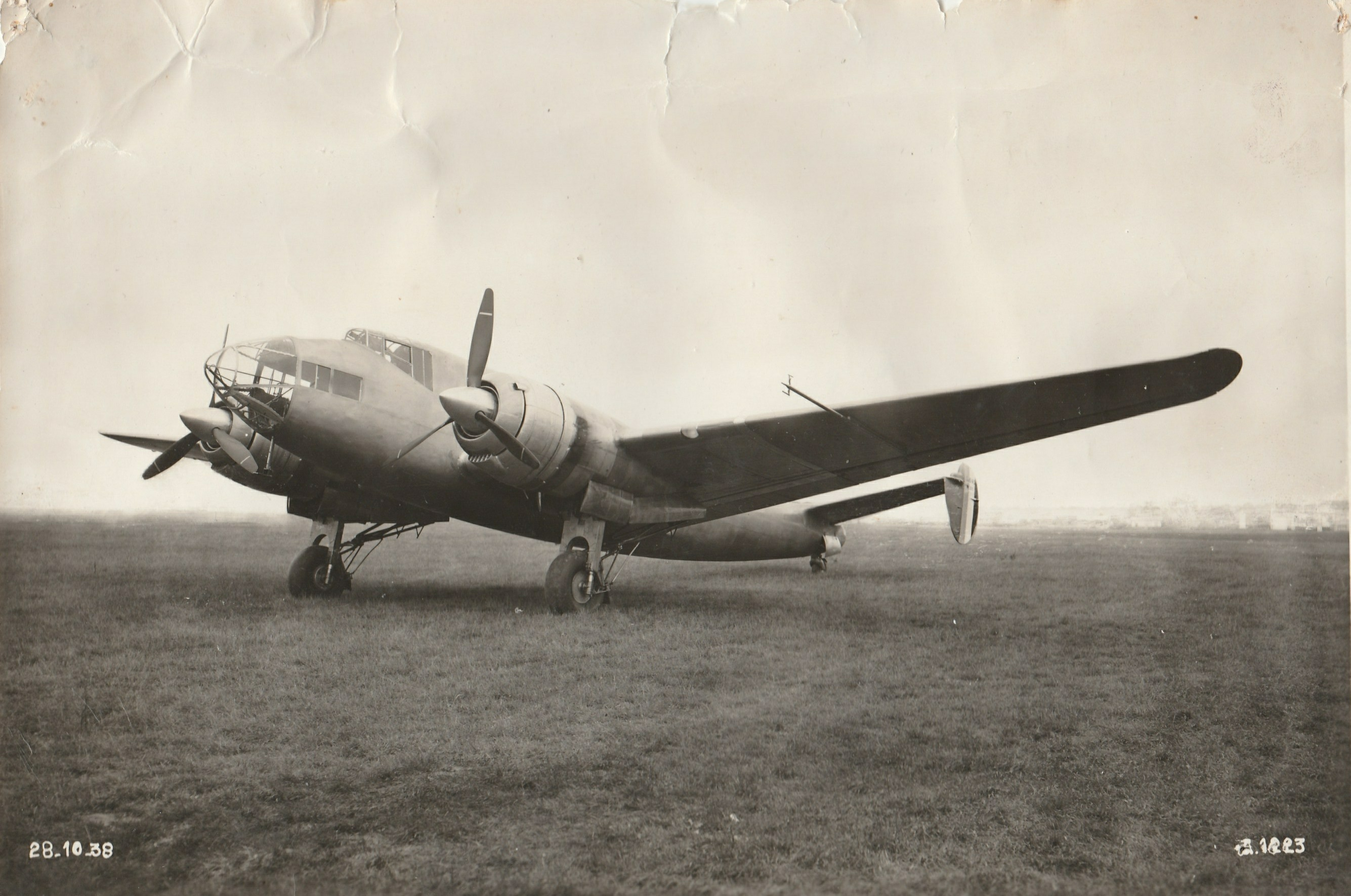
Profile view of the LeO 45.

=== Background ===
On 1 April 1933, the French Air Force was officially recognised as an independent military service. In accordance with this new position, in addition to cooperating with land and naval operations, there was a newfound emphasis on the ability to execute independent strategic-level operations. It was quickly determined that existing aircraft would be incapable of performing the latter role to a sufficient degree, thus a modernisation programme, known as Plan I, was promptly initiated. This plan called for 1,010 modern combat aircraft suitable for first-line service to be provisioned by late 1936; out of these, 350 were to be bombers, further divided into 210 medium bombers, 120 twin-engined heavy bombers, and 20 four-engined heavy bombers.

While numerous multi-seat aircraft, such as the Bloch MB.200, Bloch MB.210, Amiot 143, Lioré et Olivier LeO 257, Potez 540 and Farman F.221, were procured between 1933 and 1935, many of these originated from technical programmes which had predated the recognition of the service's independence and thus had not been developed to meet its new strategic ambitions. In addition, several shortcomings was quickly identified with many of these aircraft, including inadequate defensive armaments, being too slow and relatively unmanoeuvrable, and thus too vulnerable for viable sorties over hostile territory. Accordingly, the need for their replacement was apparent. It was out of the Plan I modernisation programme that the requirements for an advanced medium bomber were formulated for the new service.

On 17 November 1934, the Service Technique Aéronautique released the B5 heavy bomber programme and made approaches to all of the main French aircraft manufacturers. Various requirements were specifying a five-seat bomber with a top speed of 400 km/h (215 knots, 250 mph) at 4,000 m (13,125 ft) and a combat radius of 700 km (435 mi) carrying an internally carried payload of 1,200 kg (2,650 lb). The new bombers would have to be capable of operating at day and night, while carrying defensive turrets, the forward unit being fixed to the fuselage while the ventral position was to be flexible. In late 1935, Amiot, Latecoere, Romano, Lioré et Olivier and Bloch presented the mock-ups of their submissions.

During the latter half of 1935, the Service Technique Aéronautique decided to enact several changes to some of the specified requirements; these included the revision of the rearward and lower turret arrangements and the crew reduced from five to four, as it was thought that the co-pilot could also serve as a navigator and bomb-aimer. To reflect the crew change, the programme was re-designated from B5 to B4. In September 1936, the envisioned bomber's requirements were revised to account for development of 1,000 hp (746 kW)-class engines; accordingly, the cruise speed raised to 470 km/h (255 knots, 290 mph). It was at this point that Plan I was cancelled in favour of Plan II, which called for an even larger and more capable bomber force to be provisioned for the French Air Force; under this plan, it was envisioned that a total of 41 units each equipped with 12 B4-type aircraft would be established.

Amongst the numerous manufacturers to submit proposals for the B4 programme was Lioré et Olivier, which was to be soon nationalized as part of the SNCASE. Lioré et Olivier was a long-time supplier to the Armée de l'air, providing aircraft such as its LeO 20 and other lesser-known biplane bombers. This had earned the company a reputation for reliability, but were had been relatively traditional and conservative in terms of their design. The 1934 programme was put under Pierre Mercier, a younger engineer who had expertise in cantilever airframes. It was out of Mercier's work that a new design emerged, which was soon christened as the LeO 45.

=== Flight testing ===
On 16 January 1937, the LeO 45-01 prototype, powered by a pair of Hispano-Suiza 14AA-6 / Hispano-Suiza 14AA-7 radial engines producing 1,120 hp (835 kW) each, flew for the first time. Despite problems experienced with longitudinal instability, engine reliability and overheating, the aircraft demonstrated excellent overall performance. During flight testing, the prototype was capable of reaching 480 km/h (260 knots, 300 mph) at 4000 m and of attaining 624 km/h (337 knots, 388 mph) in a shallow dive.

In September 1937, the prototype was delivered to the Centre d'Essais de Matériels Aériens at Villacoublay for the type's official evaluation. On 6 December 1937, it was involved in a forced landing incident as a result of both engines having failed simultaneously in mid-flight; the pilot, Jean Doumerc, was able to land without sustaining any damage. The prototype was promptly returned to the manufacturer for adjustments prior to the resumption of evaluation flights. In July 1938, the prototype, fitted with the new Mercier-designed cowlings, attained 500 km/h (270 knots, 311 mph). The earlier instability issues were partially addressed via the adoption of redesigned twin fins and rudders on the tail unit.

Various issues with the troublesome Hispano-Suiza engines had been experienced and this resulted in several changes being made to the prototype, such as the adoption of broader, more efficient air intakes for the oil coolers, which in turn reduced instances of engine overheating. On 29 August 1938, it was decided to replace the existing Hispano-Suiza engines by Gnome-Rhône 14N 20/21 engines, which were capable of producing 1,030 hp (768 kW) each; as a result of these changes, the aircraft was re-designated as LeO 451-01. Following the completion of the re-engining, the flight test programme was resumed, running from 21 October 1938 to February 1939. In spite of the new engines being slightly less powerful, the speed and general performance of the prototype remained relatively unchanged.

=== Production ===
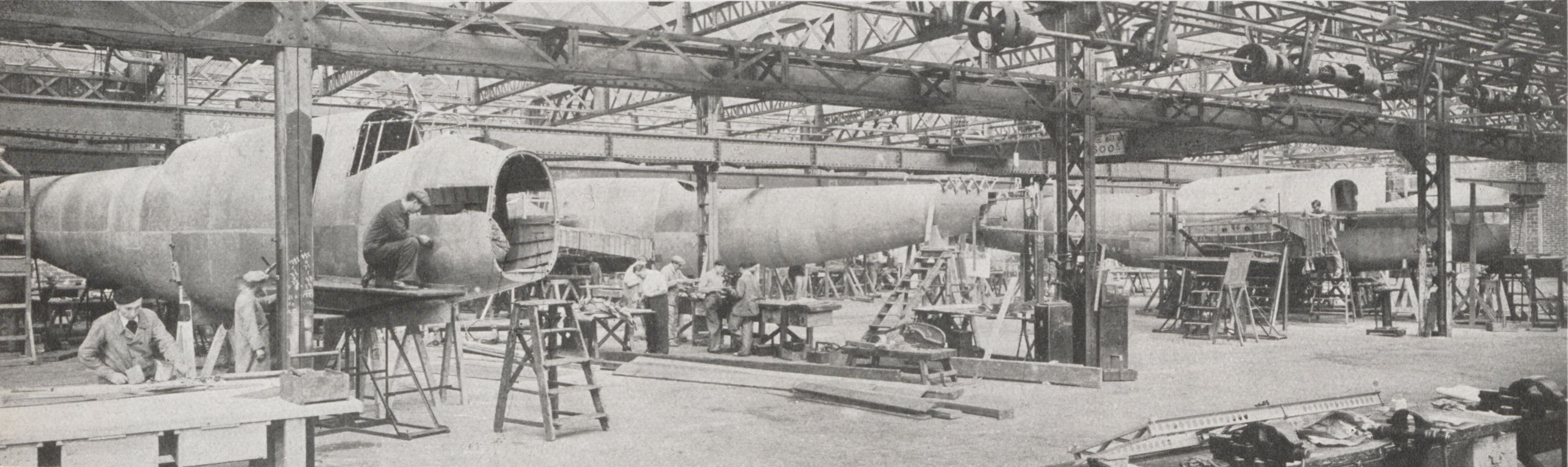
Production of LeO 45s in the SNCASE plant, 1938.

In May 1937, the Armée de l'Air placed an initial pre-production order for a pair of LeO 450 aircraft, one being fitted with Hispano-Suiza AA 06/07 engines and the other with Hispano-Suiza 14 AA 12/13 engines. On 29 November 1937, an order for 20 production machines was received, the first being specified for delivery in May 1938. On 26 March 1938, a further 20 LeO 450 was ordered in line with the French Air Ministry's newly adopted Plan V, which called for the reequipping of 22 bomber units. In order to meet French ambitions, which was viewed as requiring 449 frontline aircraft and 185 reserve aircraft, by April 1940, official contracts were also issued for Bloch 131 and Amiot 350 aircraft as stop gap measures, along with another 100 LeO 45 aircraft being ordered on 15 June 1938.

On 21 October 1938, it was specified that all production LeO 45 aircraft were to be equipped with Gnome-Rhône engines in place of the originally envisioned Hispano-Suiza powerplants. However, as a result of this demand, there was considerable delays in the delivery of the first production aircraft. During late November 1938, the first LeO 45 was on static display at the Paris Air Show; it performed its maiden flight on 24 March 1939. On 28 April 1939, the second production aircraft conducted its first flight. Further production issues were encountered as a result of supply issues with Gnome-Rhone engines and associated propellers; as a result, it was decided to fit the type with Ratier-built propellers instead, which reduced the maximum speed from 500 km/h to 470 km/h.

During early 1939, as it was becoming apparent that the international situation was worsening and that the European powers were increasingly likely to be involved in a major war, the Armée de l'Air explicitly requested of SNCASE that the company would not delay production by enacting any further improvements; the mandate was issued in spite of known teething troubles with the type that were far from cleared. At the same time, the requirements of Plan V were elevated to 1188 B4 bombers, 396 of these being first line aircraft. Accordingly, on 20 February 1939, a tentative order for 100 aircraft was confirmed; on 18 April 1939, a large order for a further 480 LeO 45 bombers was received.

By September 1939, the eve of the outbreak of the Second World War, there were a total of 749 LeO 45 aircraft on order; this included several different variants of the type, such as an envisioned high altitude model, aircraft outfitted with American-built Wright GR-2600-A5B engines, and 12 aircraft which had been ordered for the Greek Air Force. At the same point, there were only 10 LeO 451 bombers in French Air Force service, while another 22 were in the process of being delivered. It was at this point that a flurry of additional wartime production orders were issued, calling for hundreds more aircraft to be manufactured, amounting to around 1,549 LeO 45 aircraft of various models. While additional productions lines were established in order to produce more aircraft, much of this extra capacity did not arrive until mere months prior to the catastrophic Battle of France, thus making their contribution to the course of the war minimal.

== Design ==
The Lioré et Olivier LeO 45 was a twin-engined medium bomber, which had been conceived with the aim of producing a suitably advanced bomber to equip the French Air Force. In contrast to its predecessors, which had relied on machine guns for self-protection, the emphasis was placed on high-speed high-altitude cruise. The expectation was that high speed would force enemy fighters into tail-chase attacks and to that effect the aircraft was designed with a rear-firing cannon which possessed an unobstructed rear arc of fire thanks to the design of the twin tailfins.

The LeO 45 featured an all-metal construction and a monocoque fuselage; the structure included 60 individual fixed frames attached to longitudinal stringers and was covered by flush-rivetted light alloy panels. As a consequence of the specified speed requirements of the programme, a lot of effort was spent in reducing parasitic drag. The fuselage cross-section was reduced via the adoption of a main fuselage bomb bay paired to smaller bomb bays that were located within the wing roots. The low cantilever wing, which employed a structure designed and patented by Mercier, was constructed in four separate sections. Specifically, the inner section was built around two spars equipped with steel booms which had enough room between them to accommodate a 200 kg-class bomb and large self-sealing fuel tanks; the spars did not continue to the wing-tip but made way for a box-type structure. The wings were furnished with large split-type slotted flaps, which were electronically controlled and high aspect-ratio slotted ailerons, the latter of which being depressed during takeoff.

The fuselage housed the aircraft's four-man crew; the bombardier, who was also the commander as per French tradition, was positioned within an almost-fully glazed nose at the front of the aircraft, ahead of the pilot, and performed observation and bombing aiming functions from this location. Behind the pilot, the radio operator could man a defensive 7.5 mm M.1934 (500 rounds) machine gun from an underbelly retractable "gondola". A corridor alongside the main bomb bay led to the dorsal gunner's position, which featured a powered mounting for the 20 mm cannon Hispano-Suiza HS.404, with 120 rounds; the turret could be retracted. Another 7.5 mm machine-gun M.1934 was installed in the nose (with 300 rounds). The LeO 45 had a central bomb bay, within which the majority of the aircraft's armaments were enclosed. In total, the aircraft's armaments comprised: 120 20 mm rounds, 800 7.5 mm rounds, up to seven 200 kg bombs or other combinations (1–2 500 kg bombs in the belly, plus the two 200 kg in the wings). When flown with the maximum payload, this reduced the corresponding fuel load to only 1,000 liters. The fuel tanks were also housed within the wings, these comprising a pair of 880 lts tanks within the inner wings), along with a further two pairs of 330 and 410 liters contained in the external wings.

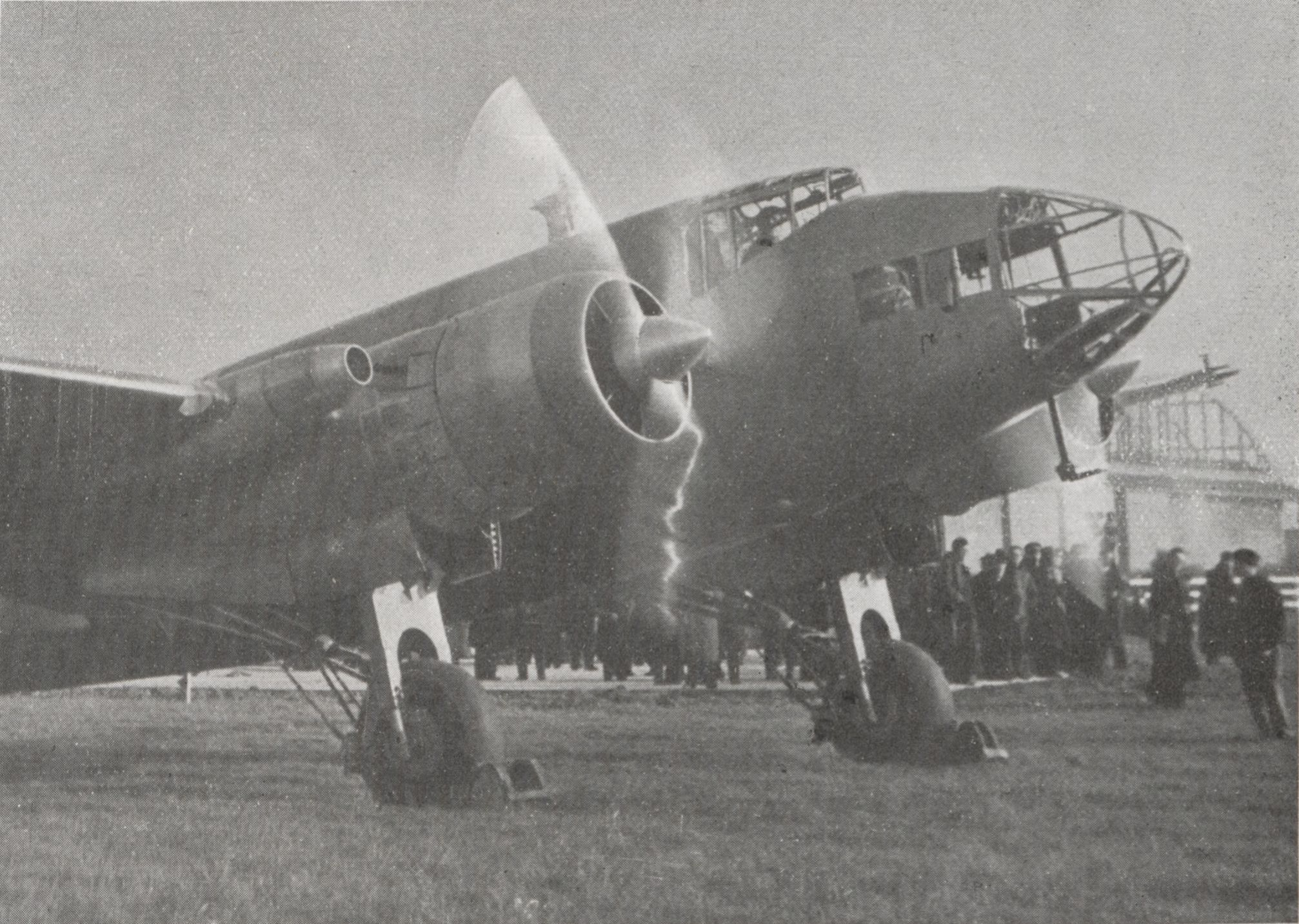
A LeO 45 with NACA cowlings in 1938.

Mercier also used his patented type of fairing for the LeO 45's radial engines. Unlike typical NACA cowlings, flow adjustment was not provided by flaps but by a frontal ring that moved back and forth to respectively reduce or increase flow, without change in drag. Like many other French twin-engine aeroplanes of the era, the propellers rotated in opposite directions to eliminate the undesirable effects of propeller torque. The undercarriage was fully retractable; it featured an unusually complicated mechanism for the main wheels in order to reduce the size of the engine nacelles. The two horizontal surfaces of the tail unit were constructed in two separate halves and bolted onto a short center section fixed to the upper fuselage; the twin fins and rudders, which were furnished with trim tabs, were attached at the extreme edges of the tailplane.

== Operational history ==
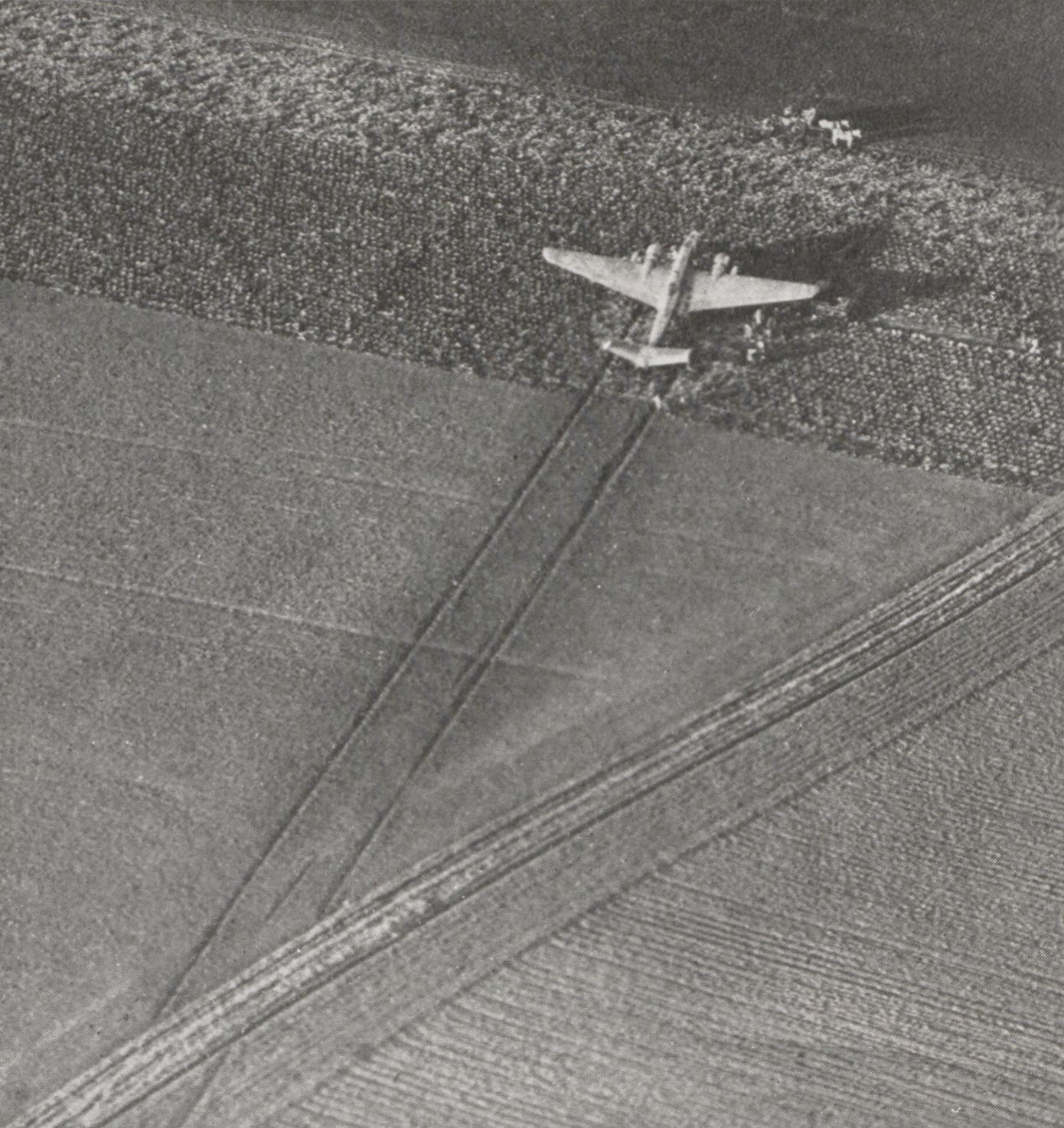
A LeO 45 having landed in the French countryside in December 1937.

At the outbreak of World War II, only ten LeO 45s had been formally accepted by the French Air Force. These aircraft were issued to a front line unit to experiment with the new type in the field and flew a few reconnaissance flights over Germany, which resulted in the type's first combat loss.

At the start of the Battle of France on 10 May 1940, only 54 of the 222 LeO 451s that had been delivered were considered ready for combat, the remainder being used for training, spares, undergoing modifications and repairs or having been lost. The first combat sortie of the campaign was flown by ten aircraft from Groupes de bombardement (bomber squadrons, abbreviated GB) I/12 and II/12 on 11 May. Flying at low altitude, the bombers suffered from heavy ground fire with one aircraft shot down and eight heavily damaged. Within the next eight days many of them were shot down, such as the one piloted by sergent-chef Hervé Bougault near Floyon, during a bombing mission over German troops. By the Armistice of 25 June 1940, LeO 451 of the Groupement de bombardement 6 (bomber wing) had flown approximately 400 combat missions, dropping 320 tons of bombs at the expense of 31 aircraft shot down by enemy fire, 40 written off due to damage and five lost in accidents. Other statistics state that about 47 bombers were lost: 26 to fighters, 21 to anti-aircraft fire.

Although the LeOs were typically faster than many fighters and also faster than almost all other types of bomber, the Luftwaffe was equipped with fighters that were even faster (such as the Bf 109 and Bf 110). The cruise speed, up to 420 km/h (7 km/min), was one of the strengths of the LeOs performance and made them difficult to intercept. The diving and climbing speeds were very good as well (the Italian SM.79 took 17 minutes to reach 5,000 m, compared to 14 for the LeO), even if not that useful for a bomber. LeOs were optimized for medium-altitude operations (5,000 m) but were forced to go far lower to search for and destroy tactical targets, rarely with even a basic fighter escort (H-75, D.520). LeOs were not unarmed and German fighters had to keep a look out for their dorsal turret: on 6 June 1940, gunner sergeant Grandchamp, GB II/11 shot down two Bf 110Cs with the Hispano cannon. German fighters came to avoid this danger by attacking from below, forcing the LeOs to deploy their retractable turret, which slowed them.

Another problem had been caused by the Germans' initial strike. Groupement 6 had 50 LeOs but these aircraft had not been dispersed and even lacked capable AA defence on their airfields. When the Luftwaffe attacked, a total of 40 bombers were lost. In spite of this, Groupement 6 continued the fight, since the LeOs were produced at a fast pace (around 4–5/day, over 200 built within 45 days) allowing them to re-equip. Losses remained high and, on missions, 13 LeOs were intercepted and four shot down by Luftwaffe fighters. Groupement 6 totalled around 70 losses both in air and ground but still continued to fight until the end.

Upon Italy's entry into the war on the Axis side, LeOs attacked Livorno, Novi Ligure, Vado and Palermo in a four-aircraft morning mission. Against Italian forces, the LeOs were able to operate without much difficulty. Turin (Fiat plants) was near the border and easy to reach, while Italy did not possess a radar system and radios were not commonly used on the Italian fighters. On the other front, however, ground-based flak fire and Luftwaffe fighters alike took a heavy toll upon the type.

A total of 452 aircraft had then been built, 373 accepted into service (including 13 for the Aéronautique navale), and around 130 lost in action in Europe.

Following the Armistice, LeO 451s continued to fly, under the Vichy government. Modifications in Vichy service included fitting the aircraft with larger rudders and two more 7.5 mm machine guns in the rear turret. The extra weapons were added because of the limited capacity of the cannon magazines and the fact that changing them in flight was extremely difficult. Aircraft production had stopped with the German occupation but a 1941 agreement authorized Vichy authorities to have a limited number of military aircraft built and orders were placed for 225 newly built Leo 451s. In order to speed production, considerable use was made of components that had been built in 1940 and stored in the German-occupied zone. The first of the newly produced aircraft flew on 30 April 1942, and by the time the German occupation of Southern France following Operation Torch brought production to an end, 102 LeOs had been built for Vichy. In 1942, LeO 451-359 was fitted with an experimental degaussing coil for remotely detonating naval mines (some British Vickers Wellingtons and German Junkers Ju 52s also carried a similar device).

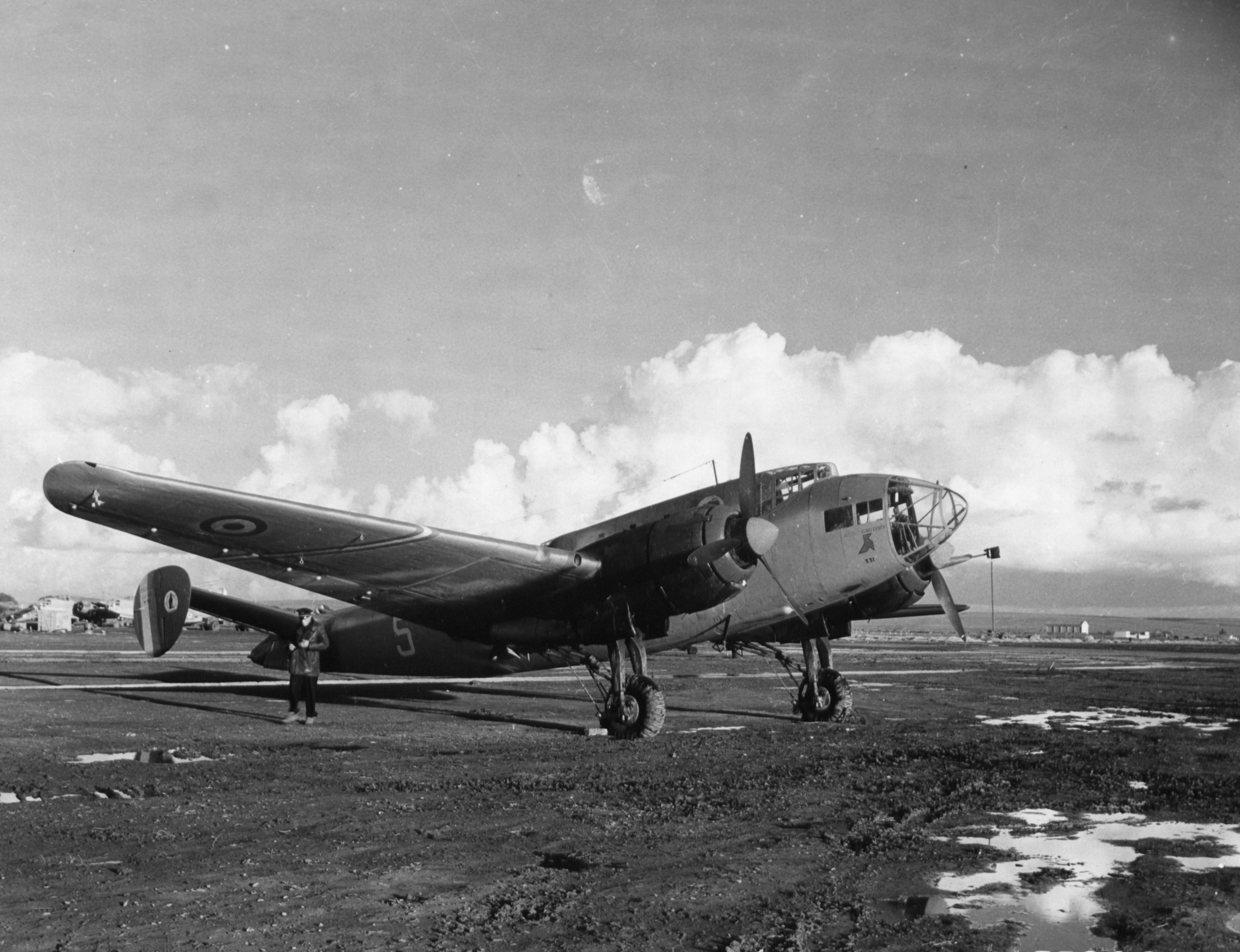
LeO 451 in North Africa, January, 1943

On 24 October 1940, Vichy French LeO 451s carried out an air raid against Gibraltar in retaliation for the Free-French attack on Dakar, losing one of their number to British anti-aircraft fire. Two bomber units equipped with LeO 451s, GB I/12 and GB I/31 were based in Syria when Allied forces invaded on 8 June 1941, at the start of the Syria-Lebanon Campaign. These were supplemented by GB I/25, which was dispatched from Tunisia. During this campaign, the LeO 451s flew a total of 855 sorties, losing 29 LeO 451s in the process. After Operation Torch which began on 8 November 1942, surviving French LeO 451 in North Africa were used primarily for freight duties, although they flew a few bombing missions against Axis forces during the Tunisia Campaign. They were replaced by Handley-Page Halifax and Martin B-26 Marauder bombers.

The Germans were not especially interested in the type but on 21 May 1943, the Luftwaffe requested the Regia Aeronautica to hand over 39 LeO 451s captured by Italians troops in the SNCASE factory in Ambérieu-en-Bugey (Lyon). The Luftwaffe, claiming to have previously bought the LeOs, gave in exchange a stock of 30 Dewoitine D.520s. The 451s were converted into transport aircraft for fuel and troops. Other LeOs were delivered to the Regia Aeronautica and 12 were put in service with a ground attack unit, although they saw almost no active service.

Following the war, the 67 surviving aircraft were mostly used as trainers and transports. The LeO 451 was retired in September 1957, making it the last pre-war French design to leave active duty.

== Variants ==
LeO 45.01
First prototype, powered by two Hispano-Suiza 14AA-6 / Hispano-Suiza 14AA-7 radial piston engines.
LeO 451.01
The first LeO 45.01 prototype was redesignated, fitted with two Gnome-Rhône 14N engines.
LeO 451 B4
Medium bomber, main production version variously fitted with Gnome-Rhône 14N-48 / Gnome-Rhône 14N-49 or Gnome-Rhône 14N-38 / Gnome-Rhône 14N-39 or Gnome & Rhône 14N-46 / Gnome-Rhône 14N-47 engines
LeO 451GS
LeO 451C
Twelve LeO 451T aircraft were redesignated, used as mail transport aircraft for Air France.
LeO 451E
Post-war flying laboratory, 11 modified.
LeO 451LC
Long-range courier conversion.
LeO 451M
LeO 451 intended for the Aéronavale (with minimal differences), 68 ordered. Originally known as the LeO 456.
LeO 451T
German-captured bombers modified for freight duty, seating for up to 17 troops. Around about 50 aircraft were modified.
LeO 452
Version powered by two 1,150 hp (860 kW) Hispano-Suiza 14AA-12 / Hispano-Suiza 14AA-13, later powered by two 950 hp (710 kW) Gnome-Rhône 14N-38 / Gnome-Rhône 14N-39. Prototype trials was inconclusive so the project was abandoned.
LeO 453
Post-war conversion to high-speed transports and search-and-rescue aircraft, powered by two 895 kW (1,200 hp) Pratt & Whitney R-1830-67 engines, seating for 6 passengers, range 3,500 km (1,890 nm, 2,175 mi) at 400 km/h (215 knots, 250 mph) cruising speed, 40 modified.
LeO 454
Version powered by two 1,375 hp (1,025 kW) Bristol Hercules II engines, one prototype left unfinished.
LeO 455
High-altitude version with two turbo-supercharged Gnome-Rhône 14R engines producing 1,375 hp (1025 kW) each, 400 ordered, one prototype built. The aircraft flew on 12 March 1939 but was later destroyed on the ground. After the war, the designation was reused for three LeO 451s modified as engine test-beds, used by SNECMA.
LeO 455Ph
Post-war photo-reconnaissance variant, powered by two 1,600 hp (1195 kW) SNECMA 14R engines. Five LeO 451s were modified and were used by the Institut Géographique National.
LeO 456
Naval version. Re-designated as the LeO 451M.
LeO 457
3-seat high-altitude, pressurized version.
LeO 458
Version powered by two Wright GR-2600-A5B radial engines, 200 ordered. One prototype's construction started in spring 1940. (Note: Unknown if the prototype was completed before the Armistice or was left unfinished.)
LeO 459

== Operators ==
France

- Armée de l'air
- Aéronautique navale
- Air France

Vichy France

- Vichy French Air Force

Germany

- Luftwaffe operated several captured aircraft.

Italy

- Regia Aeronautica

United States

- United States Army Air Forces operated several captured aircraft as unit hacks.

== Specifications (LeO 451) ==
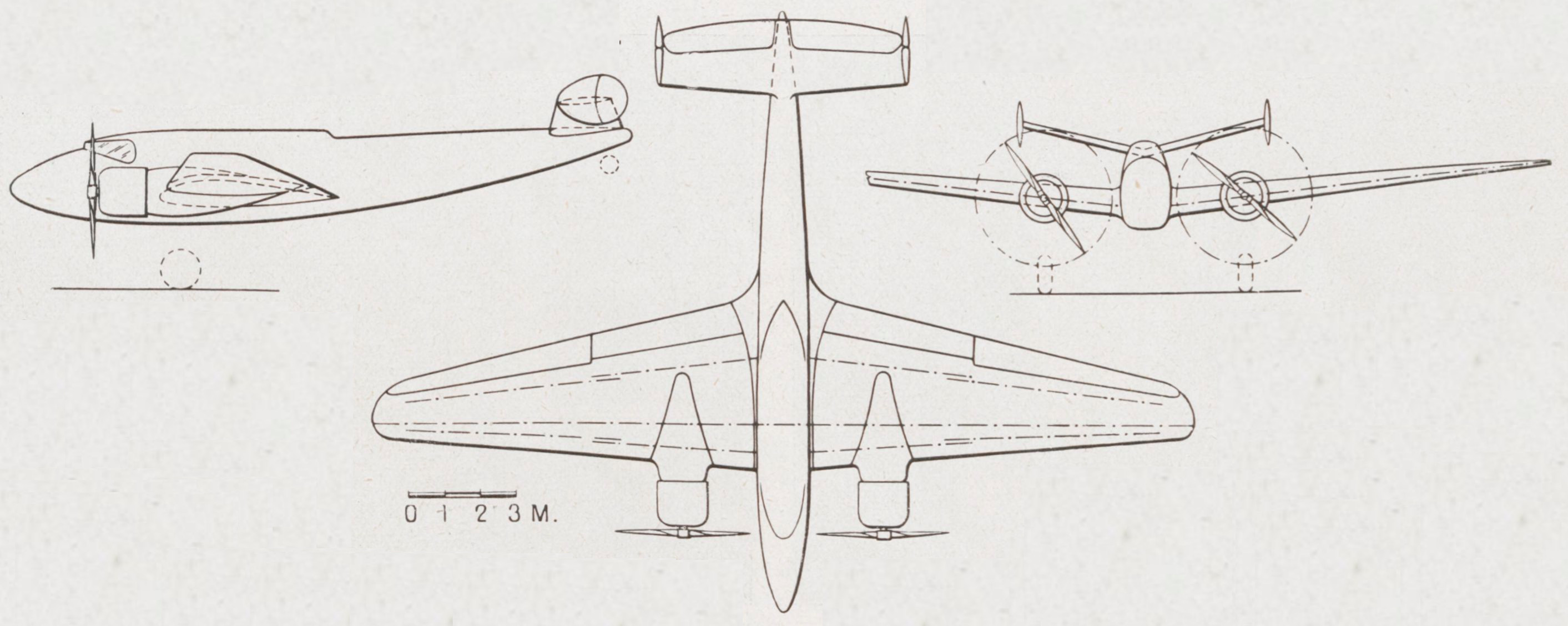
3-view drawing of the LeO 45

Data from The Lioré et Olivier LeO 45 Series (Aircraft in Profile 173)

General characteristics

- Crew: 4
- Length: 17.17 m (56 ft 4 in)
- Wingspan: 22.52 m (73 ft 11 in)
- Height: 5.24 m (17 ft 2 in)
- Wing area: 66 m^{2} (710 sq ft)
- Empty weight: 7,530 kg (16,601 lb)
- Max takeoff weight: 11,398 kg (25,128 lb)
- Fuel capacity: 3,235 L (855 US gal; 712 imp gal)
- Powerplant: 1 × Gnome-Rhône 14N−48 14-cylinder air-cooled radial piston engine, 790 kW (1,060 hp) LH rotation (or −38 or −46)
- Powerplant: 1 × Gnome-Rhône 14N−49 14-cylinder air-cooled radial piston engine, 790 kW (1,060 hp) RH rotation (or −39 or −47)
- Propellers: 3-bladed constant-speed propellers (LH and RH rotation)

Performance

- Maximum speed: 495 km/h (308 mph, 267 kn) at 4,000 m (13,000 ft)
- Cruise speed: 420 km/h (260 mph, 230 kn)
- Range: 2,900 km (1,800 mi, 1,600 nmi)
- Service ceiling: 9,000 m (30,000 ft)

Armament

- Guns:
  - 1 × 20 mm (0.79 in) Hispano-Suiza HS.404 cannon in dorsal turret with 120 rounds
  - 1 × 7.5 mm (0.295 in) MAC 1934 fixed forward-firing machine gun with 300 rounds
  - 1 × 7.5 mm (0.295 in) MAC 1934 in "dustbin" retractable ventral turret with 500 rounds
- Bombs:
  - Up to 1568 kg (3,457 lb) of bombs in fuselage and wing root bomb bays
  - 7 × 200 kg bombs (actual bomb weight: 224 kg (494 lb))

== See also ==
Aircraft of comparable role, configuration, and era

- Amiot 354
- Bristol Blenheim
- Dornier Do 217
- Douglas A-20 Havoc
- Heinkel He 111
- Junkers Ju 88
- Martin Baltimore

Related lists

- List of aircraft of the French Air Force during World War II
- List of aircraft of World War II
- List of bomber aircraft
