= Heinkel He 176 =

Experimental rocket plane

He 176
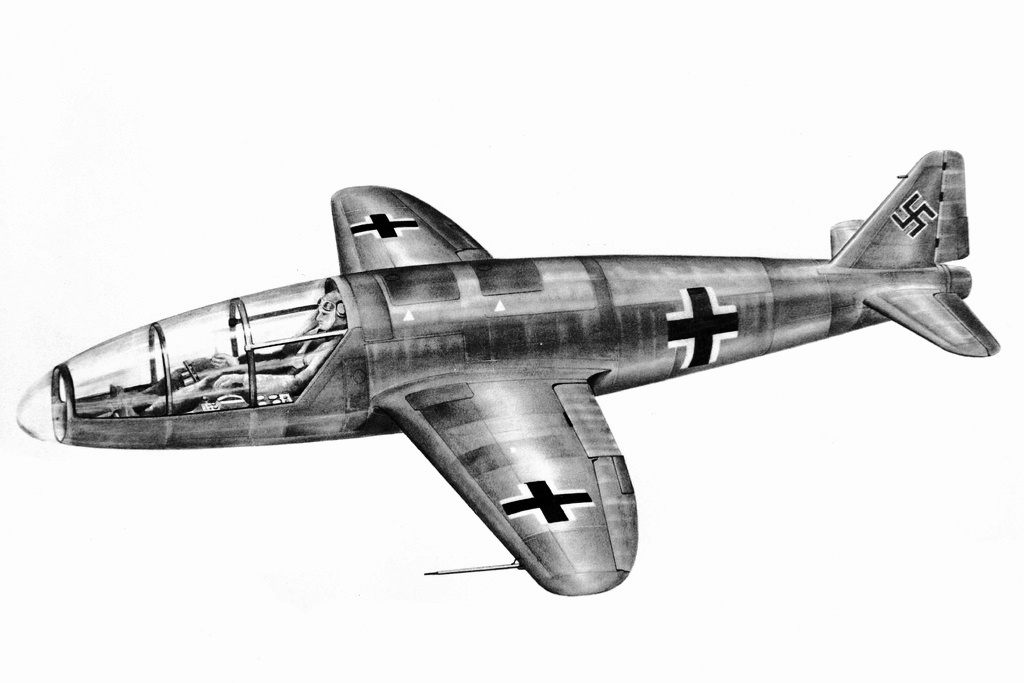
- Post war artist impression of the He 176

General information
- Type: Experimental
- Manufacturer: Heinkel
- Status: Cancelled

History
- First flight: 20 June 1939

The Heinkel He 176 was a German experimental rocket-powered aircraft. It was the world's first aircraft to be propelled solely by a liquid-fueled rocket, making its first powered flight on 20 June 1939 with Erich Warsitz at the controls.

The He 176 was developed as a private venture by the Heinkel company in accordance with director Ernst Heinkel's emphasis on developing technology for high-speed flight. Work on the project began in 1936 after testing with a modified He 72 and a pair of He 112s had shown rocket propulsion to have some viability. The He 176 was purpose-built to harness this propulsion, rather than a modification of existing piston engined-types. The resulting aircraft, largely composed of wood, was of relatively simple build in some aspects, and relatively compact. It incorporated some novel concepts, such as an unconventional reclined seating position for the pilot and a unique jettisonable nose escape system for emergencies. In December 1937 the aircraft was officially designated He 176.

On 12 September 1939, the He 176 project was ordered to be cancelled, apparently due to the aircraft's unimpressive size and performance. However, the aircraft did provide "proof of concept" for rocket propulsion and high speed flight in general; lessons and designs cues were incorporated into subsequent aircraft such as the Heinkel He 280 prototype jet fighter and the Messerschmitt Me 163 rocket interceptor. The prototype itself along with most documentation related to the He 176 had been destroyed by the end of the war. Warsitz considered that some material may have entered the Soviet/Russian archives. The often-quoted performance data of the aircraft, such as its speed reaching 750 km/h, or 800 km/h, is drawn from Warsitz's account, and are usually not based on sound documents. Only two true pictures of the He 176 have survived, probably taken in Peenemünde during testing.

== Design and development ==
=== Background ===
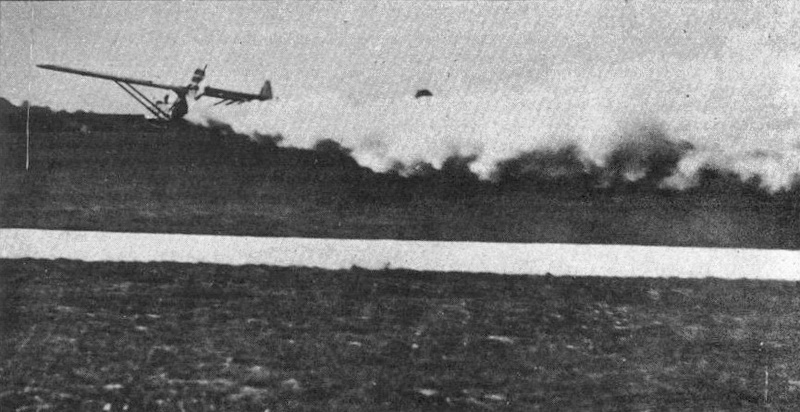
Opel RAK.1, world's first public flight of a rocket-powered aircraft on September 30, 1929, piloted by Fritz von Opel

During the 1920s, German daredevils and inventors had experimented with the use of solid-fuel rockets to propel various vehicles, such as cars, motorcycles, railway carriages, snow sleds, and, by 1929, aircraft such as Alexander Lippisch's Ente and Fritz von Opel's RAK.1. Solid-fuel rockets, however, have major disadvantages when used for aircraft propulsion, as their thrust cannot be throttled, and the engines cannot be shut down while fuel remains.

In the mid 1930s, the aerospace engineer Wernher von Braun and his rocketry team working at Peenemünde investigated the use of liquid-fuelled rockets for powering aircraft. The German aircraft designer Ernst Heinkel became an enthusiastic supporter of their efforts, initially supplying a He 72 and later a pair of He 112s to support these experiments. During early 1937, one of these aircraft was flown with its piston engine shut down during flight, propelled by rocket power alone. At the same time, Hellmuth Walter's experiments into hydrogen peroxide monopropellant-based rockets were leading towards light and simple rockets that appeared well-suited for aircraft installation, although at the price of considerable danger and limited endurance.

The experimental flights of the He 112 had been subject to the close attention of the Reichsluftfahrtministerium (RLM) (the German Reich Aviation Ministry), which had become interested in the potential for a rocket-propelled interceptor aircraft. Heinkel decided to establish a secret department at its Rostock facility to pursue such endeavours; work commenced as early as 1936. Unlike the preceding He 112, the design team wanted to produce an aircraft purpose-built to harness this new form of propulsion, thus achieving superior performance from it; from this effort the He 176 emerged.

=== Design ===
The basic design of the He 176 was sketched out during the Neuhardenberg rocket motor and booster tests. In 1936, the RLM awarded Heinkel the contract to build the world's first rocket aircraft. It was decided to tailor-build the aircraft to specifically fit the test pilot Erich Warsitz, minimising the size of the cockpit, along with the rest of the aircraft, thus making the aircraft as lightweight as humanly possible. The resulting cockpit was so cramped that the pilot could not even flex his elbows, and some controls were placed in inconvenient positions. Due to the high speed range that the He 176 was designed to encounter, the sensitivity of these controls had to be adjusted multiple times throughout the flight for the pilot to maintain sufficient control. The cockpit also had an unconventional reclined seating position, adopted to help the pilot cope with the aircraft's high acceleration; it also helped reduce the frontal area and thereby had performance benefits. A crude plexiglas glazed section was removable so that the pilot could enter the aircraft.

The aircraft itself was relatively compact and in some respects of fairly simple build, made almost entirely of wood, but with an advanced and entirely enclosed cockpit with a frameless single-piece clear nose. The undercarriage was a combination of conventional and tricycle gear designs, for which the main gear's struts were intended to retract rearwards into the fuselage while the aerodynamically faired nose wheel and strut were fixed. The greatest diameter of the fuselage was only 700 millimetres (28 in). The overall surface area, including the fuselage, was 5 square metres (54 sq ft), with a 5 metres (16 ft) wingspan, a fuselage length of 5.5 metres (18 ft), a height with the undercarriage deployed at 1.44 metres (4.7 ft), and a wheelbase of 700 millimetres (28 in). The aircraft's rudder proved to be relatively ineffective at slow speeds; during takeoff runs, it was found more practical to steer using differential use of the wheel brakes.

The He 176 featured an elliptical wing that had a wing sweep of 40% and a thickness of 9% at 90 millimetres (3.5 in). The wing had a slight positive dihedral so that sufficient stability would be maintained. The fuel tanks were integrated into the interior of the wings; a new welding technique had to be developed to manufacture these. Significant attention was paid to the reduction of aerodynamic drag. During ground test runs, it was discovered that the wings would often make contact with the ground; to prevent damage to them, the wingtips were fitted with metal bumpers.

The design team recognised that the conventional means of escaping the aircraft in an emergency by bailing out would be extremely difficult at high speed, and perhaps impossible without fatal injury to the pilot. Consequently the He 176 was equipped with a unique jettisonable nose escape system. Compressed air was used to separate the nose from the aircraft, then a drogue chute was used to reduce the opening force required. After the drogue was deployed, the flush-fitting cockpit canopy was released and the pilot could bailout. Unmanned scale mockups of the nose section were flight tested from a Heinkel He 111 bomber with positive results.

The original model of the He 176 was designed to be powered by one of the new Walter engines. This engine was similar to that of the He 112, the primary difference being the doubling of its thrust output to 6,000 Newtons, largely achieved via the addition of a pump to draw in propellant instead of using compressed air to push the fuel into the engine. The fuel used was 82% hydrogen peroxide. To provide more effective directional controls while flying at slow speeds, a rudder was to be installed within the engine nozzle itself. Detailed design work on the aircraft was completed by July 1937, after which construction of the prototype commenced almost immediately. In December 1937, the He 176 designation was officially assigned to the aircraft.

=== Flight testing and cancellation ===
On 20 June 1939, the He 176 performed its maiden flight piloted by Warsitz, the occasion being the first manned rocket flight in the world. Warsitz later described the flight: "On quite another heading from that originally intended she leapt into the air and flew with a yaw and a wobble. I kept her close to the ground while gaining speed, then pulled back gently on the control stick for rapid ascent. I was at 750 kms/hr and without any loss in speed the machine shot skywards at an angle somewhere between vertical and 45°. She was enormously sensitive to the controls...Everything turned out wonderfully, however, and it was a relief to fly round the northern tip of Usedom Island without a sound at 800 kms/hr. I banked sharp left again to straighten up for the airstrip, losing such speed and altitude as I could, and during this steep turn the rocket died as the tanks dried up. The abrupt loss of speed hurled me forward in my restraint straps. I pressed the stick forward, hissed rapidly over the Penne and came in at 500 kms/hr. I crossed the airfield boundary and after several prescribed little bounces the machine came to a stop."

Following the initial test flight, the aircraft received alterations; apparently the fixed nose wheel was removed at this point as the design team intended to use only the two main wheels and the tail for regular landings. Following an initial round of flight testing, Heinkel demonstrated the He 176 to the RLM, which, however, showed little official interest. According to Warsitz, speaking of Von Braun's cooperation during the tests at Pennemunde: "Although not technically part of the He 176-V1 project with the Walter rocket engine, naturally everything affecting it was of interest to himself and his colleagues because the He 176-V2 was to have the von Braun engine..."

The RLM's unfavourable attitude towards the aircraft was a major contributor to Heinkel's decision to reduce his involvement in rocket propulsion efforts. On 12 September 1939, the discontinuation of the He 176 test programme was officially ordered, apparently due to dissatisfaction with its performance and size. Only the one aircraft was ever completed; after its retirement, it was put on static display at the Berlin Air Museum. It was destroyed by an Allied bombing raid during 1943.

=== Impact ===
Before the cancellation of the programme, Heinkel had been designing a more sophisticated rocket-powered aircraft, sometimes referred to the He 176 V2, which was apparently intended for operational use. For this model, a more powerful von Braun engine would have been used, for speeds of up to 1,000 kph (620 mph). No such aircraft was ever constructed, but because it bore the same designation as the aircraft that was actually flown, many books and websites mistakenly publish pictures of this design intended to illustrate its earlier namesake.

Some of the technical knowledge gained through the He 176 was incorporated into future projects undertaken by Heinkel, such as the He 280 prototype jet fighter.

Germany did eventually fly an operational rocket-propelled fighter, the Alexander Lippisch-designed Me 163 Komet, but this was produced by the competing Messerschmitt firm. By the time that orders to terminate work on the He 176 had been received, early work on the Me 163 project had already commenced. It was powered by a similar rocket engine that was actually a further development of the unit that had powered the He 176.

== Specifications (He 176 V1) ==
Heinkel He 176 V1 with main gear retracted

Data from Heinkel: An aircraft album

General characteristics

- Crew: 1
- Length: 5.21 m (17 ft 1 in)
- Wingspan: 5.00 m (16 ft 5 in)
- Height: 1.435 m (4 ft 8.5 in)
- Wing area: 5.4 m^{2} (58 sq ft)
- Empty weight: 900 kg (1,985 lb)
- Gross weight: 1,620 kg (3,572 lb)
- Powerplant: 1 × Walter HWK R1-203 liquid-fuelled rocket engine, 5.88 kN (1,323 lbf) thrust , 50 s burn time

Performance

- Maximum speed: 750 km/h (466 mph, 405 kn) estimated
- Cruise speed: 710 km/h (441 mph, 383 kn) estimated
- Range: 109 km (68 mi, 59 nmi)
- Service ceiling: 9,000 m (29,500 ft)
- Rate of climb: 60.6 m/s (11,930 ft/min)
- Time to altitude: 2.5 minutes to 8,000 m (26,250 ft)

== See also ==
Related lists

- List of military aircraft of Germany
- List of rocket aircraft
