= Romano R.120 =

R.120

General information
- Type: Bomber
- National origin: France
- Manufacturer: Chantiers aéronavals Étienne Romano
- Designer: Etienne Romano
- Primary user: French Air Force (intended)
- Number built: 1

History
- First flight: 1938

The Romano R.120 was a twin-engine 4-seat bomber aircraft designed by Etienne Romano in the 1930s.

== Specifications ==
Data from Aviafrance: Romano R.120

General characteristics

- Crew: 4
- Length: 16.1 m (52 ft 10 in)
- Wingspan: 21.1 m (69 ft 3 in)
- Height: 4.25 m (13 ft 11 in)
- Wing area: 58 m^{2} (620 sq ft)
- Empty weight: 4,800 kg (10,582 lb)
- Gross weight: 9,100 kg (20,062 lb)
- Powerplant: 2 × Hispano-Suiza 14AA 14-cylinder two-row air-cooled radial piston engine, 730 kW (980 hp) each

Performance

- Maximum speed: 520 km/h (320 mph, 280 kn)
- Range: 1,400 km (870 mi, 760 nmi)
- Service ceiling: 9,000 m (30,000 ft)

Armament

- Guns: **2 x 7.5 mm (0.295 in) MAC 1934 in the nose turret
  - 1 x 7.5 mm (0.295 in) MAC 1934 in a ventral position
  - 1 x 20 mm (0.787 in) Hispano-Suiza HS-404 in a dorsal turret
- Bombs: 1,000 kg (2,200 lb) of bombs
