= Erich Warsitz =

German aviator (1906-1983)

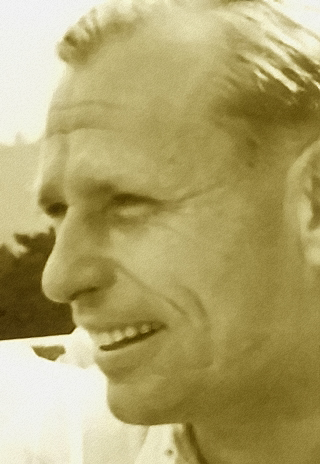
- Born: Erich Karl Warsitz; October 18, 1906; Hattingen, Province of Westphalia, German Empire
- Died: July 12, 1983 (aged 76); Lugano, Switzerland
- Known for: Test Pilot (Rechlin) & Chief Test Pilot (Peenemünde West) - RLM
- Aviation career
- Famous flights: Heinkel He 178, He 176, He 111 & He 112
- Rank: Flight Captain, Luftwaffe

Erich Karl Warsitz (18 October 1906 – 12 July 1983) was a German test pilot of the 1930s. He held the rank of Flight-Captain in the Luftwaffe and was selected by the Reich Air Ministry as chief test pilot at Peenemünde West. He is remembered as the first person to fly an aircraft under liquid-fueled rocket power, the Heinkel He 176, on June 20, 1939 and also the first to fly an aircraft under turbojet power, the Heinkel He 178, on August 27 the same year.

== Biography ==
=== Aviation career ===
Warsitz was born at Hattingen.

Together with his practical tuition and technical studies, Erich Warsitz’ aeronautical training as a sport flier for the A-2 licence began at the Academic Aviation Group Bonn/Hangelar (1929-1930). In stages subsequently came the B-1 and B-2 training at various aerodromes of the contemporary sports associations, and further training at DVS (German Commercial Pilot School) at Stettin for the C-2 (land aircraft and commercial carriage of persons) and all licences for flights over the sea. Meanwhile, he was awarded the major K-2 aerobatics licence, passed the blind-flying training and obtained the navigation certificate for short distances. After he had been to DVS and obtained all flying licences there, he took employment as a sporting aircraft instructor and was later transferred to the Reichsbahnstrecke (i.e. the Railway section, a cover name for long-distance flying experience, a unit concealed within the 100,000-man Weimar standing army) as flight instructor, senior flight instructor and then training leader. In 1934 orders arrived drafting him to Rechlin, the Luftwaffe’s test centre. At that time the German aviation industry was operating at full blast, and at Rechlin Erich Warsitz was soon flying everything the aircraft factories could produce. This was the starting point of an activity which, only a little while later, would bring him into intimate contact with developments in aviation which were of tremendous historical importance.

==== Heinkel He 111 and 112 ====
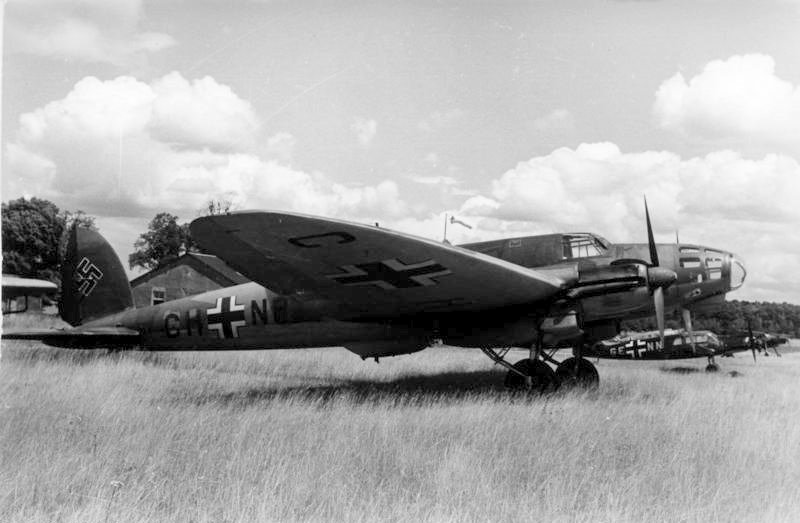
A He 111E in Luftwaffe service, 1940, without rocket boosters

Late in 1936 Erich Warsitz was seconded by the RLM to Wernher von Braun and Ernst Heinkel, because he had been recognized as one of the most experienced test-pilots of the time, and because he also had an extraordinary fund of technical knowledge. In 1937, working closely with Wernher von Braun, Erich Warsitz undertook the initial flight testing of the Heinkel He 112 fitted with von Braun's rocket engine. Despite the wheels-up landing and having the fuselage on fire, it proved to official circles that an aircraft could be flown satisfactorily with a back-thrust system through the rear. In parallel the RLM had suddenly acquired an interest in so-called rocket boosters fitted for the sake of simplicity below the wings of a heavily loaded bomber to cut down the length of runway needed for take-off from small aerodromes and airfields. Once in the air the spent booster casings would be dropped by parachute for re-use. The firm of Hellmuth Walter at Kiel handled this development. The first standing trials and tests flights of their boosters were also held at Neuhardenberg using a Heinkel He 111E placed at disposal by Heinkel.

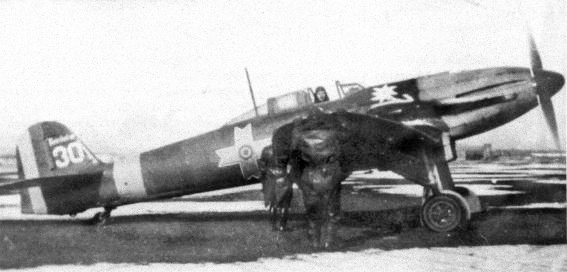
A regular He 112.

Walter had also been commissioned by the RLM to build a rocket engine for the He 112, so there were two different new rocket motor designs at Neuhardenberg: whereas the von Braun's engines were powered by alcohol and liquid oxygen, Walter engines had hydrogen peroxide and calcium permanganate as a catalyst. Von Braun's engine used direct combustion and created fire, the Walter devices hot vapours from a chemical reaction, but both created thrust and provided high speed. The subsequent flights with the He 112 used the Walter-rocket instead of von Braun's; it was more reliable, simpler to operate and the dangers to pilot and machine were less. All those test flights at Neuhardenberg were made by Erich Warsitz.

==== Heinkel He 176 ====
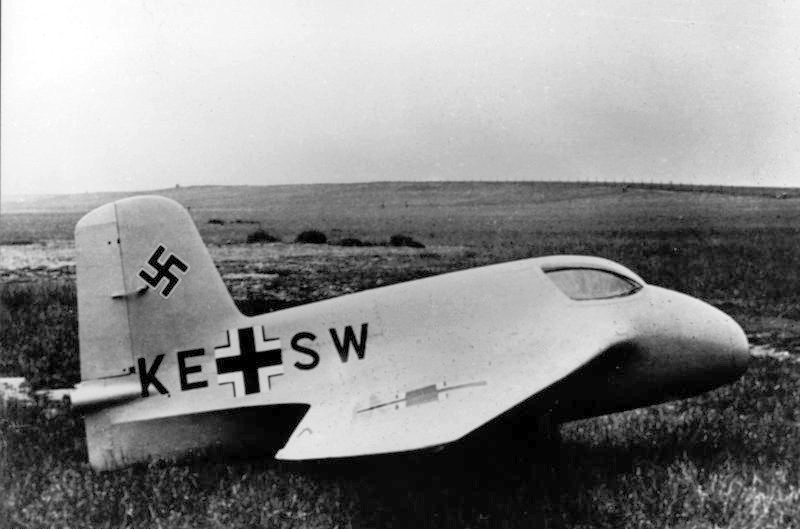
The Me 163 A V4 prototype, 1941.

During the development programme at Neuhardenberg the term "interceptor" had been coined, and the Heinkel He 176 was seen as the research machine for the project. The RLM was really thinking along the lines of a new kind of fighter aircraft. With a fantastic rate of climb it would take off almost vertically to intercept enemy bomber formations at 6000 – 7000 metres, make a swift attack from below at high speed, emptying the MGs or cannons into the enemy machines and then land once the fuel tanks were dry. The Messerschmitt Me 163, which was developed and tested independently of the He 176, came later, during the Second World War, as an operational interceptor. Because the He 176 development was classified top secret, Heinkel set up a special department in his Rostock-Marienehe works. A wooden barrack hut was erected first for the initial testing. Only very few employees were allowed access. This "shed" was soon converted into a permanent building. The development then progressed very quickly. Ground work began at Peenemünde-West with rolling tests to establish the characteristics on the runway.

There came a moment when Erich Warsitz felt that a series of brief hops in the He 176 had made him familiar with its characteristics and nasty tricks, and he suddenly made up his mind to carry out the first real flight on June 20, 1939.

==== Heinkel He 178 ====
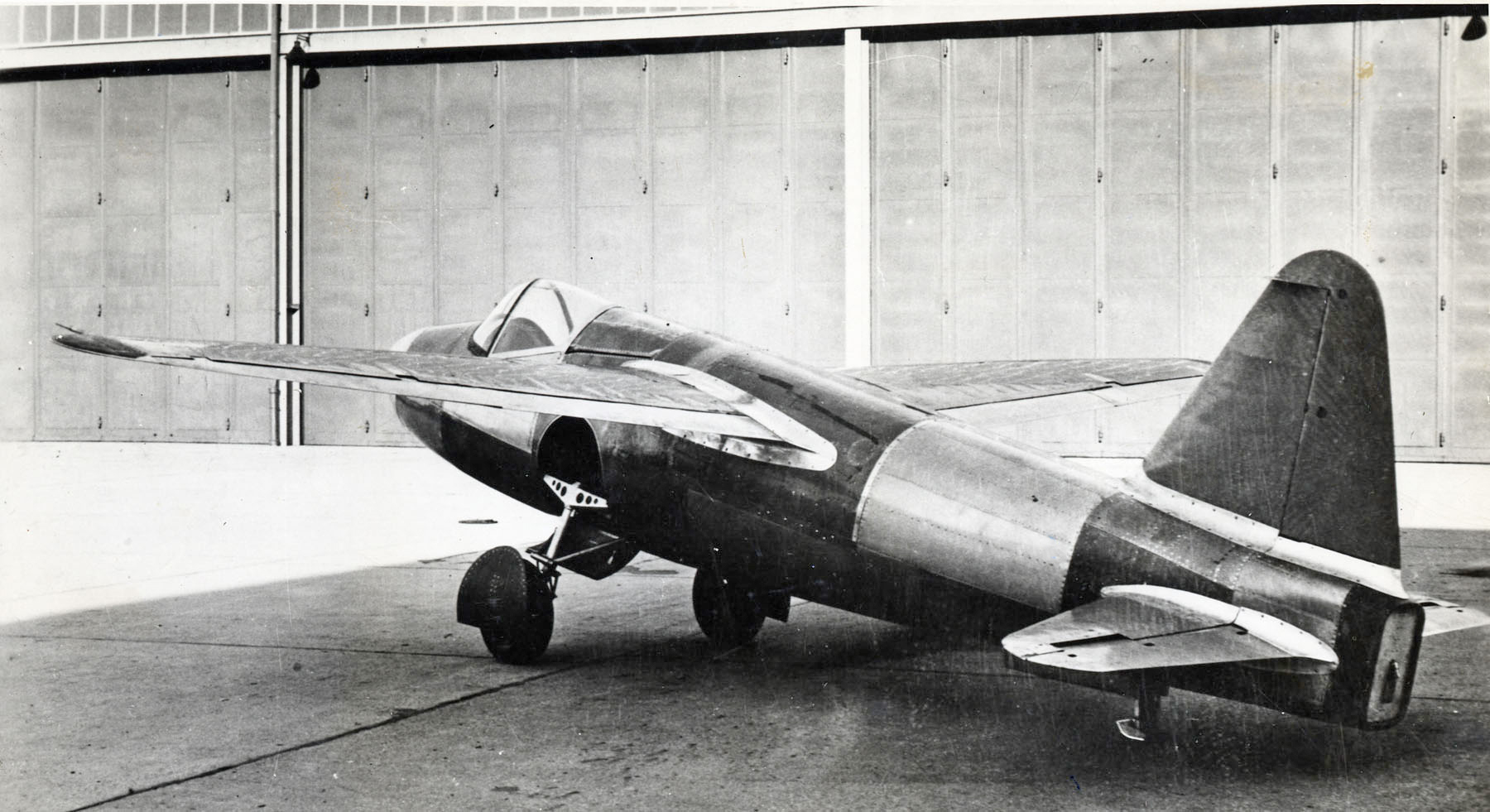
The Heinkel He 178

The He 176 rocket aircraft had been developed in close collaboration with the RLM, but in spite of its success, Heinkel did not receive the support he had hoped for. In fact, there were many important individuals at the Air Ministry who showed an interest, but the Second World War was imminent, and other concerns took centre stage. The He 178 design was pushed through without the knowledge of the RLM, and it was this small aircraft which was later to usher in the Jet Age. On August 27, 1939 Erich Warsitz undertook the world first jet flight with the Heinkel He 178 fitted with Hans von Ohain’s jet engine, the He S 3 turbine.

After the second circuit Erich Warsitz set the He 178 up for the landing. The turbine responded to the throttle lever very obediently. Just above the ground he corrected the machine’s attitude, pulled off a perfect landing and came to a halt just short of the waters of the Warnow.

==== World War II ====
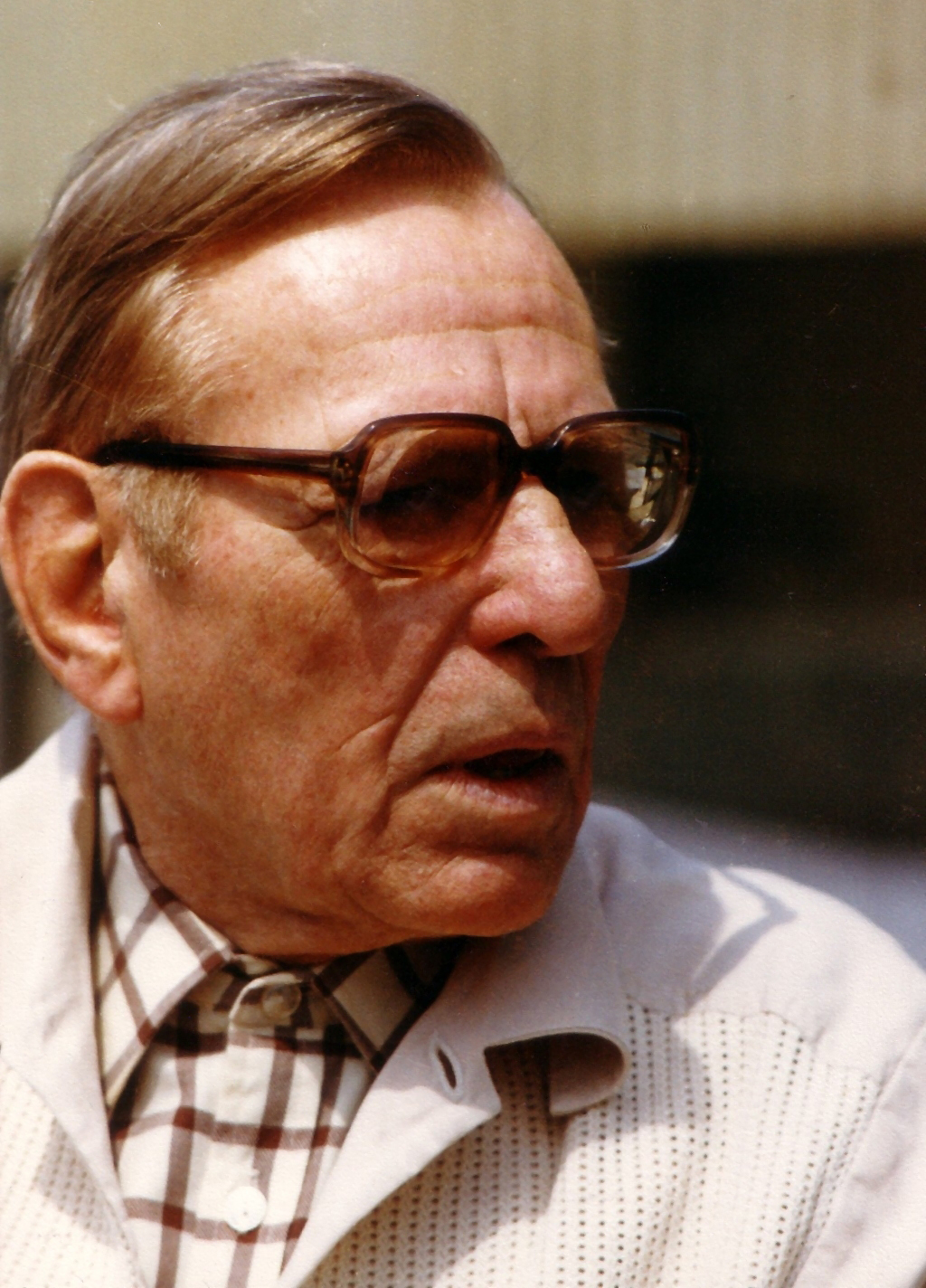
Erich Warsitz at the age of 75 (1982)

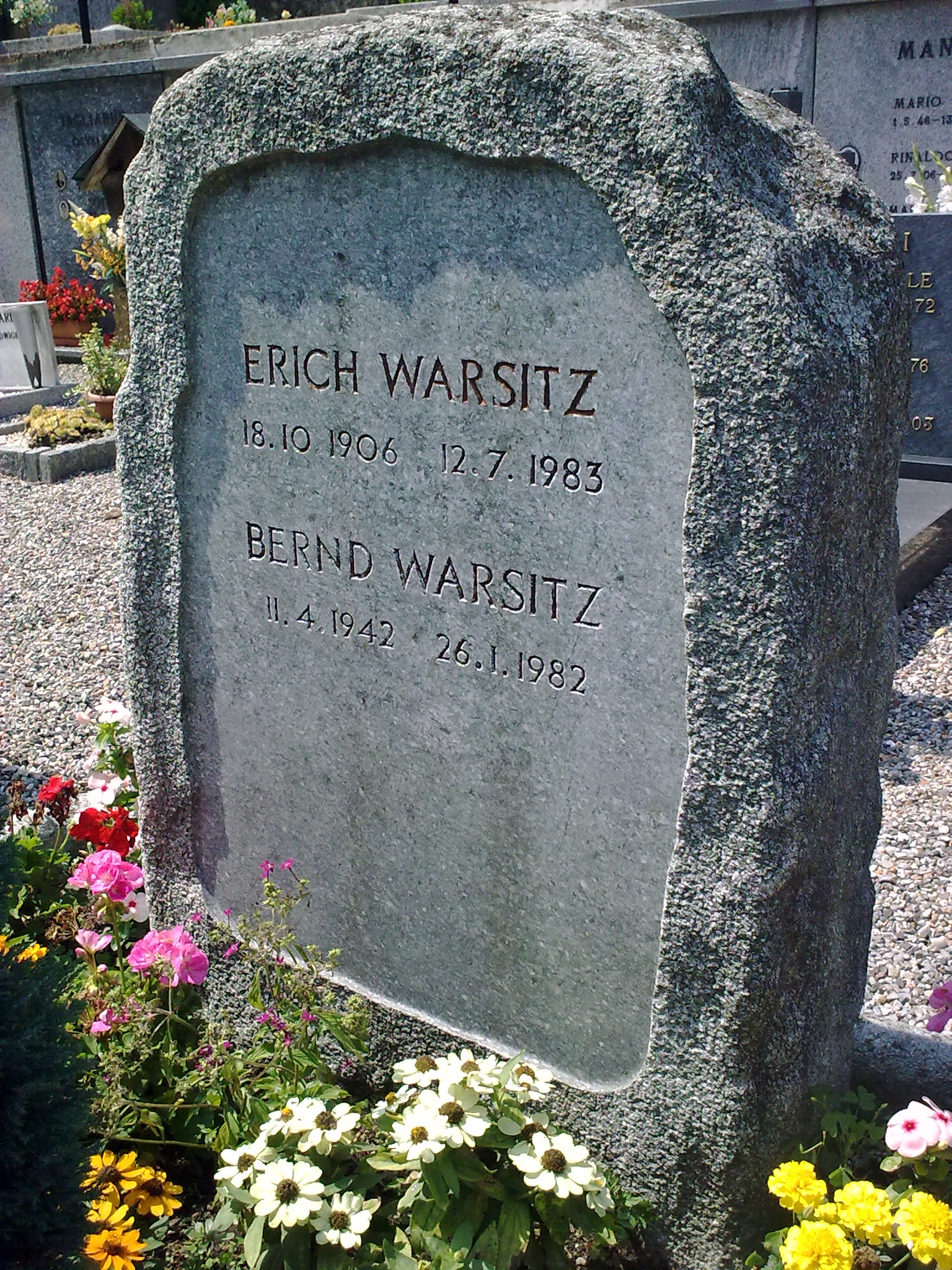
Grave of Erich Warsitz (Cemetery of Barbengo, Lugano, Switzerland)

After the Führer-Directive, ordering all developments not ready for mass-production within a year to be suspended with immediate effect, Erich Warsitz dedicated himself fully to his work as chief test pilot at Peenemünde-West. In 1941 also as an instructor in Nantes and Eindhoven training the bomber squadrons the correct use of the rocket boosters (Heinkel He 111 and Junkers Ju 88).

In 1942, during a test flight with a Messerschmitt Bf 109, he had an accident – caused by a faulty fuel lead – which put him out of flying for a year. Thus he took over the management of his father’s precision mechanical firm and also founded the ‘Warsitz Werke’ in Amsterdam making various high-precision materials.

=== Post-war ===
After the end of the war, Warsitz was living in an apartment in the American sector of Berlin, but at 3 a.m. on the night of 5 / December 6, 1945 he was abducted by four Soviet officers. Numerous interrogations followed, concentrating on his former work on the development of rocket and jet aircraft in the OKH and RLM, at Peenemünde and the Heinkel factory. He was required to sign a contract which obliged him to co-operate with the Soviets for a period of five years on the development of related technology, but he refused. As a result, he was condemned to twenty-five years forced labour. Shortly after this he was transported to Siberia, to the penal colony 7525/13.

After his return in 1950, thanks to Chancellor of West Germany Konrad Adenauer, he founded his precision mechanical firm “Maschinenfabrik Hilden”, until, in 1965, he retired.

== Death ==
In April 1983, Warsitz suffered a stroke and as a result died at the age of 76 on July 12, 1983, at Lugano, Switzerland.

== Commemoration ==
For his flying achievements, Erich Warsitz’ memory was honoured with a special stamp issue by the German Post Office on October 4, 2007.

== Cultural references ==
- Rocketmen, a documentary produced by film director Philip Osborn in 2009.
