= Fedden Mission =

British scientific mission

The Fedden Mission was a British scientific mission sent by the Ministry of Aircraft Production to Germany at the end of the Second World War in Europe, to gather technical intelligence about German aircraft and aeroengines. It was named for the Mission's leader, Roy Fedden. It visited Bad Oeynhausen, Bad Eilsen, Völkenrode, Braunschweig, Magdeburg, Oschersleben, Staßfurt, Dessau, Kothen, Nordhausen, Göttingen, Kassel, Eisenach, Frankfurt, Rüsselsheim, Darmstadt, Stuttgart, Esslingen, Reutlingen, Mengen, Lindau, Freising, Munich, Rosenheim, Kochel, Oberammergau, Kolbermoor, Salzburg, Spittal, Villach, and Klagenfurt. This is much less than the fifty-two locations they had intended to visit when the Mission began.

The Mission was inspired in part by the similar American scientific mission, Operation Lusty, as well as by the German advances in jet aircraft and engines, as well as ballistic missiles, toward the war's end. It was also, in part, inspired by the desire to disarm Germany and prevent another postwar rise, like the one following the end of the First World War. (Unspoken, but also doubtless a factor, was a desire to keep Britain from becoming a second-rate nation.) In any event, the capture of German technology by both the United States and Soviet Union contributed to an acceleration of the postwar arms race.

Organized at the instruction of Stafford Cripps, then Minister of Aircraft Production, the Mission consisted of Fedden; Dr W J Duncan, Professor of Aeronautics from University College of Hull, then seconded to the Royal Aircraft Establishment (RAE); J C King of RAE's Structural and Mechanical Engineering Department; Flight Lieutenant A B P Beeton, RAF, of RAE's Engine Department; Bert Newport of Rotol, Ltd. They were assisted by W J Stern of the Allied Control Commission and Wing Commander V Cross, RAF, the Mission's Liaison Officer to Supreme Headquarters Allied Expeditionary Force (as well as its translator); their two RAF Dakotas were flown by F/L Reid, RAF, and F/L Cheany, RAFVR. These aircraft each carried one of the Mission's Jeeps, which they soon learned to unload and have on the road in only ten minutes.

Everywhere the Mission went, it encountered looting by Allied troops and German civilians, and sabotage by German factory workers and the Heer (on Hitler's orders) The German scientists and technicians were, in general, very co-operative with the British interviewers, with Fedden mentioning "considerable apprehension" about their fate and some wishing to emigrate to the U.S. or Canada. (They had genuine concern about forced emigration to the Soviet Union, as many of the V-2 program scientists suffered.)

The Mission particularly criticized the RLM for its starting and stopping of engine production programs.

== In Germany ==
=== First week - June 12-16 ===
The Mission left RAF Northolt on Tuesday, 12 June 1945 at 14.15, bound for Bückeburg, Germany, 25 mi (40 km) southwest of Hannover. They reached Bückeburg at 16.30 and were immediately sent on to another airfield; they eventually reached Bad Eilsen, headquarters of Second Tactical Air Force, at 21.30. From there, they were driven to 21st Army Group. headquarters at Bad Oeynhausen, where they spent their first night. Wing Commander Cross, by proposing one aircraft fly ahead to arrange accommodations, permits for interviews, travel permits for interview subjects, and so on, made an important contribution to the timely operation, and ultimate success, of the Mission. The Mission's access to German civilians was strictly limited by an Allied policy discouraging contact beyond what was strictly necessary.

The Mission based their initial forays out of Braunschweig, in the British Occupation Zone, where they spent their first six days, moving later to Kassel, in the American Zone. For their more southerly objecties, they worked out of Freising, headquarters of Third U.S. Army Intelligence, some 20 mi (32 km) from Hamburg, for another six days. Their third base of operations was SHAEF Headquarters, Frankfurt.

On their second full day in Germany, Thursday 14 June, they visited the most secret German aeronautical research establishment, the Hermann Göring Institute (or Luftfahrtforschungsanstalt, LFA), at Völkenrode; they remained there through 15 June. Völkenrode, today a western district of the nearby city of Braunschweig, was at the top of Fedden's list — despite its eventual presence on the west side of the Inner German border, with Völkenrode being within West German borders — because it was initially within the designated Russian Zone of Occupation, due to be handed over from British control (in which it was when he departed) in a matter of days. When the Mission arrived, the LFA had already been stripped by Combined Intelligence Objectives Subcommittee (CIOS) teams, and was (despite being in the British Zone) effectively in U.S. hands.

At Völkenrode, the Mission examined the wind tunnels. These had been used to develop the swept wing, the forward-swept wing, the Messerschmitt Me 262, the BMW-designed cowlings used for all versions of the BMW 801 radial (used in the Focke-Wulf Fw 190 and a number of other important German military aircraft designs, especially in unitized engine formats), the Argus-designed pulsejet engine of the V-1 cruise missile, and other items. The members also viewed examples of the Rheinmetall-Börsig F25 Feuerlilie surface-to-air missile, named for the Fire Lily flower (though the Mission Report shows photographs of the F55), and examples of documentation concerning the competing designs for the Amerikabomber design competition (which is suspected to not have included any mention, nor discovered any evidence of Heinkel's entry in the program), as well as the Engine Department.

While the team found evidence of trials of photoelastic lacquers for stress tests, it proved impossible to interview any of the laboratory staff to learn more. (Fedden considered the LFA Engine Department lacking in modern equipment, but the LFA complex possessed a better altitude test bed installation than any in Britain; a better example still would be seen at BMW's Munich facility.) The turbojet engine research artifacts found included examples of turbine and stator blade forms, blade cooling, blade construction (including hollow and ceramic types), piston cooling, and other matters. While at Völkenrode, the Americans stole equipment from under the noses of the British (including an interferometer), only to have the thefts denied when confronted by Britain at Potsdam. The Fedden Mission spent two days at Völkenrode, its sub-team returning ten days later.

The Mission left Braunschweig airfield 19.15 on Friday, 15 June for Kassel, 80 mi (130 km) away (where the Henschel firm's aviation division was based); next morning, one group went to Göttingen to interrogate Dr. Ludwig Prandtl and his team; Fedden called them "a first class team of experimental research workers". While in Göttingen, Mission members examined more than ten wind tunnels on the campus, plus several used for fluid dynamics studies. They spent 17 June in Göttingen, also.

The same day, the second Mission group flew to Oschersleben (the home of AGO, a major Fw 190A subcontractor) then drove by Jeep to the Junkers jet engine plant at Magdeburg. They had little time before it, and all the surrounding territory, was handed over to the Soviets. The Junkers works, used for manufacturing and overhaul of Jumo 004 jet engines, had been heavily bombed; while there were a number of engine test-beds, there was no sign of jet engine research having been done there. Otto Hartkopf, then acting works manager, conducted the Junkers factory tour, explaining all the jet engine drawings had already been removed. Hartkopf reported over 5,000 jet engines had been produced there in all; production, including several other plants, was expected to reach 5,000 per month. (At war's end, deliveries of 004s had reached 1,500 a month.) The Mission observed the construction methods of the 004; Fedden criticized the attachment of the 004's compressor casing, which was in two halves, bolted to the half-sections of the stator assemblies.

=== Second week (17-23 June 1945) ===
The Mission also examined production of the BMW 003 jet engine, at facilities in Eisenach and Staßfurt. On Monday, 18 June, it split in two teams again, one driving the Eisenach works. Fedden met with Dr. Bruno Bruckmann, head of BMW's jet engine research program in Berlin and strong supporter of jet engine production and use, as well as to drive propellers (turboprop engines); in 1942, Bruckman was made head of BMW piston engine programs. At Eisenach, the Mission spoke to the facility's managing director, Dr. Schaaf, and Drs. Fattler and Stoffergen, learning BMW employed 11,000 there in all, 4,500 in a camouflaged factory in the side of the hill, the rest in the town. Despite adding plants at Spandau, Nordhausen, and Prague, BMW never reached the production target of 5,000 to 6,000 109-003 engines a month, with only some 500 examples of the 003 built before V-E Day.

At Eisenach, the Mission discovered the BMW 003R had incorporated a reusable liquid fueled rocket engine in the rear of the nacelle, the BMW 109-718, to act as an assisted take-off unit, or to provide acceleration in climb or flight (akin to what the Americans postwar called "mixed power"). Fedden called the production quality at Eisenach "excellent". The next day, the Mission examined a BMW facility near Staßfurt, set up in a former salt mine 400 m (1,300 ft) underground, which was to have used for machining jet engine parts, and possibly for assembly, also; Stoffergen said 1,700 machine tools had been installed, and some 2,000 workers had been employed. The Mission also found some information on the high-thrust (designed for a 34.3 kN (7,700 lbf) top output level) BMW 018 jet engine project, which was begun in 1940, but remained unfinished by war's end; Fedden himself examined compressor blade forgings and a turbine blade.

By Monday, June 18, the Mission drove from Kothen to Dessau, home of Junkers Flugzeug-und-Motorenwerke. Speaking to the technical director in charge of the inverted V12, liquid-cooled Junkers Jumo 213's development, the Mission learned there were many experimental variants, but only three [definitive] models: the 213A (the major production version), the 213E (a high-altitude model), and the projected 213J (improved still more).

The Mission visited Nordhausen (the Mittelwerk) 19 June, some by DC-3 Dakota, some by Jeep. There, they first came in contact with concentration camps (among which Nordhausen was not officially counted). Nevertheless, Mission members found themselves revolted. With the handover to the Soviets only two days away, the Mission had little time to explore, and there was no well-informed guide. They found hundreds of incomplete V-1s, and many spare parts for the V-2, even after the U.S. had spent the ten weeks since the factory was discovered stripping it before turning it over to the Soviets; as much as three hundred railcar-loads worth of material may have been removed, in addition to numerous complete V-2s.

On Thursday, 21 June, the Fedden Mission travelled from Eisenach to Klobermoor, location of the Heinkel-Hirth engine works. There, they examined copies of the Heinkel HeS 011 jet engine, one of Germany's finest and most advanced turbine engines of the period, of which only 19 development and test examples were ever completed. The Mission conducted extensive interviews with the managing director, Mr. Schaaf, and the senior planning engineer, Mr. Dorls, as well as Hartkopf, comparing piston and jet engine production; the Mission compiled a table of comparative cost of materials, finding jets were between one half and two-thirds as costly, as well as being simpler and requiring lower-skill labor and less sophisticated tooling; in fact, most of making of hollow turbine blades and sheet metal work on jets could be done by tooling used in making automobile body panels. While Fedden was critical of some of the German design decisions, the Mission estimated German jet engine production by mid-1946 would have been at a rate of at least 100,000 a year.

The Mission was told the overhaul cycle for the Jumo 004 was between thirty and fifty hours (and about fifty for the BMW 003), and approximately 300 Jumo 004 engines had been rebuilt, some more than once.

Between Wednesday, 20 June and the following Sunday (24 June), the Mission (billetted overnight 20–21 June at the Third U.S. Army's Intelligence Center, examined BMW's plant at Munich and interviewed Dr. Bruckmann, Fedden's old friend, technical director of BMW's engine programs; Dr. Amman, in charge of BMW's piston engine development; Mr. Willich, his top aide; and Dr. Sachse, senior engineer until 1942, and the man responsible for overseeing production of the 801 radial. While at Munich, the Mission examined several 801 developments, including a turbocharged version with hollow turbine blades; several of these were apparently abandoned at Kassel's airfield They also examined the Wright Duplex-Cyclone displacement class BMW 802, an "interesting and unorthodox design" by Sachse; Fedden considered it "one of the most interesting piston engines seen in Germany". Of the 83.5-litre displacement class, BMW 803 possessing a 28-cylinder layout reminiscent of the Pratt & Whitney Wasp Major, but with the BMW four-row radial design using liquid cooling instead, as designed by Dr. Spiegel of Siemens, the final report remarked, "Its layout and design appeared clumsy and rather indifferent." They also witnessed the BMW 003A-1 axial-flow turbojet run on the Herbitus test stand.

Unable to visit Daimler-Benz's Stuttgart works until the second trip in July, the Mission nevertheless found contradictions between his briefing before departure and what his interviews with the company's general manager, Mr. Haspel, and chief designer, Dr. Schmidt, told him. The Mission was informed development of the 24-cylinder Daimler-Benz DB 604 single-crankcase X engine had been stopped in 1940 by the RLM and had finally been abandoned by Daimler-Benz in September 1942; Daimler-Benz had considered 36-cylinder engines, as well.>

At Völkenrode, the Mission found examples of Otto Lutz's swing-piston engine, developed co-operatively with Bussing of Braunschweig, with work also done by Mahle and Bosch. Fedden was dismissive. By contrast, he praised German use of wind tunnels in engine development, and suggested fuel injection was increasingly important for piston engines, especially as the number of cylinders rose.

The Mission's examination of fuel injection research was hampered by being unable to speak to the injection specialists at Junkers in Magdeburg or Deckel in Munich, but at Munich, a member of Bosch's development department, Dr. Heinrich, advised the Mission members Germany had made few advances in the field beyond higher-capacity pumps, but learned BMW had preferred the Bosch closed nozzle for the 801, while Junkers chose the open nozzle for the Junkers Jumo 213 inverted V12 aviation engine. They got better information on German aircraft spark plugs, from BMW, Daimler, and Bosch, but not from Beru or Siemens, finding, in general, improvements focused on better performance at altitude or hotter, usually with better insulators or cooling.

Investigation of propellers found new research had been halted when RLM decided to focus on jets, only to be resumed. The Mission's interviews were limited to Vereinigte Deutsche Metallwerke (United German Metalworks, VDM), and, at Göttingen, they interviewed Dr. Stüper, who tested VDM's reversible propeller. This three-bladed unit had links to two electric motors, which could change the pitch at two degrees per second for constant speed or 60-100° per second for braking (in reverse mode); it was scheduled for production early in 1945, to be used by the Dornier Do 335, Dornier Do 317, and Focke-Wulf Fw 190. Mission members visited VDM's forging works at Heddernheim, on the outskirts of Frankfurt. Dr Eckert, of VDM spin-off company Continental Metall Gesellschaft (Continental Metal Company, CMG) confirmed Stüper's claims, adding CMG contemplated switching to hydraulic cylinders. CMG also had a four-bladed project propeller that could eliminate engine overspeeding, by reducing pitch on two blades and increasing it on the other two. In addition, CMG had done some work on hollow propeller blades, one made from a simple rectangular tube with welded-on edges.

Four members of the Mission went to Rosenheim and the BMW rocket development department at Bruckmühl, joined by Dr. Bruckmann, who informed them RLM had ordered rocket development begun in 1944. They were shown the BMW 109-718 assist rocket first. They were also shown the 109-558, used in the Henschel Hs 117 Schmetterling guided missile; the Report praised the 558 (though mildly. In addition, the Mission was shown the 109-548, the sustainer motor for the Ruhrstahl X-4 (which Fedden described as an "inter-aircraft rocket").

22 June, the Mission visited the Messerschmitt works at Oberammergau, in the Bavarian Alps, where a Bell Aircraft team had already been working some five weeks; there was also a representative from de Havilland. Messerschmitt had taken over a former Heer barracks in 1943, and constructed 22 mi (35 km) of tunnels. The works there were a taste of the future, and Fedden interviewed a number of Messerschmitt's senior engineers, including Hans Hornung, Joseph Helmschrott, and chief designer Waldemar Voigt. The Mission were shown examples of the Me 262, with Voigt blaming inexperience among pilots, and compressor stalls, for several accidents. They also saw a variety of projected designs, including the P.1101 (the only one prototyped), P.1110, P.1112,. and P.1108 (which Fedden, apparently, mis-identifies as the PL.08.01).

== Allied bombing ==
The Fedden Mission, throughout its time in Germany, encountered the destructive effects of bombing. Indeed, on its first day in Germany, it could scarcely navigate through Braunschweig. Many of the factories they had hoped to visit, including Daimler-Benz's in Untertürkheim (Stuttgart), Junkers' at Dessau, BMW's in Staßfurt, Bosch's in Stuttgart, and Junkers Jumo's at Magdeburg, were in ruins — the twin Junkers facilities and the Staßfurt facility for BMW were to end up in the Soviet Zone of Occupation in a very short time. Yet many interview subjects reported Allied bombing of German communications, including railyards, trains, and roads, was ultimately more damaging to production than bombing of factories, since the works could be dispersed or restored to service with relative ease. The Germans reported communications attacks reduced production of piston aeroengines by spring 1945 to a third of what it had been. For his part, Albert Speer wondered why the Allies never attacked the few engine manufacturing works, which, he suggested, would have crippled German production.

== The Second Mission ==
Most of the Mission returned to Britain on 1 July 1945, just Stern and Beeton remaining. 4 July, they arranged for the Mission to see BMW's high-altitude engine test bench in Munich, which Fedden and three others did 17 July, as part of an eight-day trip. A sub-group of the Mission, with some further British aeronautical design engineers, returned to Germany from 16–25 July 1945, working out of Freising, to examine the BMW high-altitude test chamber at Munich, as well as German facilities at Stuttgart, Göttingen, Volkenrode, and Kochel, in order to gather more information on German turbine manufacture and to witness the testing of the Goblin on the Munich testbed. The BMW facility, codenamed Herbitus, was designed and operated by Christoph Soestmeyer, and was finished in May 1944. It was used for trials on BMW and Jumo turbine engines, as well as the 801; Soestmeyer reported RLM had intended to build similar facilities at the central Luftwaffe test station, or Erprobungsstelle at Rechlin, and in Berlin, Dessau, and Stuttgart. The test facility was a building 250 ft (76 m) square and 70 ft (21 m) high, containing a steel cylindrical altitude chamber some 12 ft (3.7 m) in diameter and 30 ft (9.1 m) long, with a detachable rear section, allowing engines to be wheeled in and out for testing. It was capable of altitudes of as much as 36,000 ft (11,000 m) and test speeds 560 mph (900 km/h; 490 kn). The Mission hoped to test the Derwent V and de Havilland Goblin at altitude. Fedden called it "far in advance of any engine testing plant in England or America", and was sufficiently impressed as to suggest the plant be moved to Britain, but the Americans refused.

While in Germany, the team also returned to the enormous research station at Volkenrode, to Stuttgart, Göttingen, and Kochel, and on a day off (22 July 1945) visited Salzburg and Berchtesgaden in the Dakota.

The Mission returned to Britain with a Volkswagen on board, as well as a number of jet engines and rocket motors, turbine blades, and "a large quantity of drawings", yet much less than the Americans, which came to nearer 2,000 tons.

Unable to get the Herbitus test stand moved to Britain, and though Operation Surgeon had identified some desired 1,500 specialists to be brought to Britain (forcibly, if need be), Fedden had no better luck persuading His Majesty's Government to bring back German engineers and scientists, which both the Soviets (under Operation Osoaviakhim) and Americans (Operation Overcast, later called Operation Paperclip) were doing. In the event, only about 100 leaving Germany in 1946 and 1947 actually stayed in Britain. The Soviets moved "between 10,000 and 15,000". So many were taken by both the U.S. and the Soviet Union, the space program's running joke was, "Let's see if their Germans are better than our Germans."

== Final report ==
The Fedden Mission issued a final report in summer 1945.

== See also ==
- Ferdinand Brandner, a key designer of some of the Junkers Motorenwerke powerplants, including the advanced, multibank Junkers Jumo 222 engine series
- Operation LUSTY, the similar American effort to acquire examples of, and to better understand, "LUftwaffe Secret TechnologY".
- Watson's Whizzers, the special American aviation unit tasked by "Lusty" to help acquire examples of German military aircraft.

== Sources ==
- Christopher, John. The Race for Hitler's X-Planes. The Mill, Gloucestershire: History Press, 2013.
- Fedden, Roy. "German Piston-Engine Progress", Flight 6 December 1945, pp. 602–6. (at Flightglobal online)
