= Nakajima Kikka =

Japanese jet attack aircraft prototype

Kikka
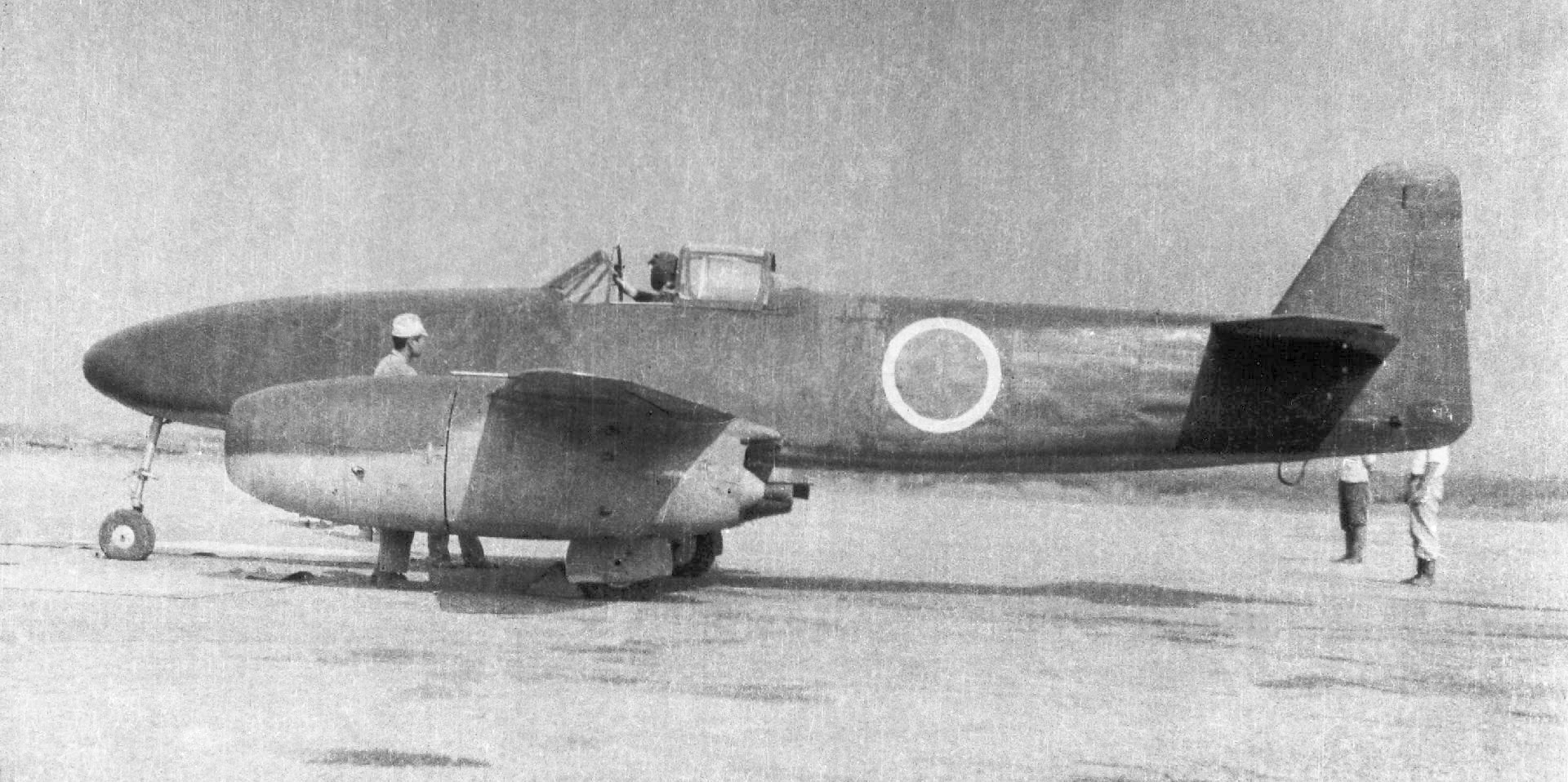

General information
- Type: Ground Attack; Anti-ship
- Manufacturer: Nakajima; Kugisho
- Designer: Kenichi Matsumura
- Status: Prototype
- Primary user: Imperial Japanese Navy
- Number built: 1 prototype plus 24 more units under construction

History
- First flight: 7 August 1945

The Nakajima Kikka (橘花; "tachibana flower"), initially designated Kōkoku Nigō Heiki (皇国二号兵器; "Imperial Weapon No. 2"), was Japan's first turbojet-powered aircraft. It was developed late in World War II, and the single completed prototype flew only once, in August 1945, before the end of the conflict.

The early development of the Kikka was influenced by, but was not a direct copy of, the Messerschmitt Me 262, the world's first operational jet-powered fighter aircraft. A Japanese military attaché had reported back from Nazi Germany after witnessing trials of the Me 262 in 1942, and a subsequent technical mission to Germany set about transferring the technologies and associated engineering information for the BMW 003 axial-flow turbojet engine and other jet-related material to Japan, although these efforts were not straightforward. During September 1944, the Imperial Japanese Navy requested that Nakajima design a jet-powered combat aircraft capable of speeds of at least 430 miles per hour while carrying a 1,100-pound bomb and possessing an operational range of no less than 125 miles. In line with Imperial Japan's declining military position, it was also stipulated that the airframe should be largely suitable for production by unskilled labour and fitted with foldable wings to better permit its storage within tunnels and aircraft shelters across the home islands.

In contrast to the Me 262, the Kikka possessed a more compact airframe and featured a straight wing (instead of a swept wing), and was originally not intended to even have landing gear, although this choice was later reversed. To assist the early jet engines, it was also to be capable of using a pair of rocket-assisted take-off (RATO) boosters. The Kikka featured an all-metal airframe. It was intended to be deployed not only as a tactical bomber but also in the interceptor role. Early on, the designer had intended to power the aircraft using a pair of Tsu-11 motorjets, however, this was switched to a pair of Ishikawajima Ne-20 axial-flow turbojet engine (which were more closely based on the BMW 003 units that had powered the Me 262) instead. At one stage, there were ambitions to have nearly 500 Kikkas completed before the end of 1945.

The first aircraft performed its maiden flight on 7 August 1945; it was damaged four days later by a hard landing. Only a single Kikka was ever completed prior to the Surrender of Japan that ended the conflict. At least three airframes and various engines were transported to the U.S., where they underwent technical analysis. No nation ever made operational use of the type. Two examples are in the collection of the National Air and Space Museum in the U.S.

== Design and development ==
The origins of the Kikka are closely associated with the development of the world's first jet-powered fighter aircraft, the Messerschmitt Me 262. Trials of the Me 262 conducted in 1942 had been witnessed by a Japanese military attaché in Nazi Germany and enthusiastically reported back to the Japanese government. Domestic experimentation with turbojet engine technology was initiated as early as the winter of 1941-42; during 1943, a Japanese technical mission to Germany selected the BMW 003 axial-flow turbojet for development in Japan. Despite the loss of a submarine-bourne shipment of engines, tooling, and technical information sent from Germany, the separate arrival of some engineering notes and photographs of the BMW 003 meant that Japan did receive at least an incomplete set of blueprints to assist their efforts.

In September 1944, the Imperial Japanese Navy issued a request to Nakajima to develop a similar aircraft that would be suitable for use as a fast attack aircraft. Performance stipulations included a maximum speed of at least 430 miles per hour, an operational range of no less than 125 miles, and the ability to carry a single 1,100-pound bomb as well as a pair of rocket-assisted take-off (RATO) booster units. Further requirements included the airframe being built largely with unskilled labor, and that it should have foldable wings. The latter feature would enable the aircraft to be hidden in tunnels and aircraft shelters around Japan as the nation was preparing for the defense of the home islands. Nakajima designers Kenichi Matsumura and Kazuo Ohno produced an aircraft that bore only a superficial resemblance to the Me 262.

The Kikka featured all-metal construction, with the exception of the fabric coverings used for the flight control surfaces. In contrast to the Me 262, the airframe of the Kikka was noticeably more compact (with just 4/5ths of the span) and more conventional, with straight wings (lacking the slight sweepback of the Me 262). The triangular fuselage cross section characteristic of the German design was also absent. To accelerate development, the main landing gear was adapted from the A6M Zero while the nose wheel from a Yokosuka P1Y bomber tailwheel. At an early stage of development, it was intended primarily to conduct kamikaze attacks, thus the airframe had originally been designed without any landing gear, having been intended to be catapult-launched (that was to be assisted using RATO units) instead. By March 1945, the Kikka’s mission profile had changed to that of a persistent tactical bomber as well as an interceptor aircraft. To perform that latter role, it was to be armed with 30mm cannon. One early decision was to place the engines in pods that were slung underneath each wing, which made it easier to install and test a variety of powerplants.

The Kikka was initially to be powered by the Tsu-11, a motorjet engine that was essentially a piston engine with a ducted fan with an afterburner, a similar arrangement to powerplants used in both Russia and Italy at that time. Subsequently, the Ne-10 (TR-10) centrifugal-flow turbojet, and the Ne-12, which added a four-stage axial compressor to the front of the Ne-10 were evaluated, however tests revealed that these did not produce enough power, and the project stalled. It was then decided to use a new axial flow turbojet based on the BMW 003.

Development of the engine was troubled, as it was based on little more than photographs and a single cut-away drawing of the BMW 003, however, the Ishikawajima Ne-20 was quickly built and by mid-1945, the Kikka project was progressing again. At this stage, due to the deteriorating war situation, it is possible that the Navy again considered the Kikka for kamikaze missions, but this is questionable due to the cost and complexity. Other more economical projects designed for kamikaze attacks, such as the simpler Nakajima Ki-115 Tōka (which used obsolete engines), the pulsejet Kawanishi Baika, and the rocket Yokosuka Ohka, were either underway or already in mass production.

Despite the production difficulties encountered, which impacted not only the volume but also the quality of both key components and fuel alike, several Japanese decision-makers remained enthusiastic for the type. At one stage, planners had called for the completion of almost 500 Kikkas by the end of 1945.

The Kikka is sometimes identified as the J9N1, or occasionally J9Y1, which according to a National Air and Space Museum researcher is incorrect and no such designation appears in any records associated with the design. The official name assigned was Kikka (橘花) and like some other Navy aircraft at the very end of the war, it received only a name. Imperial Japanese Naval aircraft until then had normally designated with a similar system to that used on U.S. Navy aircraft of the time, in which the first letter denotes the role, a number denotes the design in the sequence (starting with 1), and a second letter denotes the company that developed it, followed by a number indicating subtype.

== Operational history ==
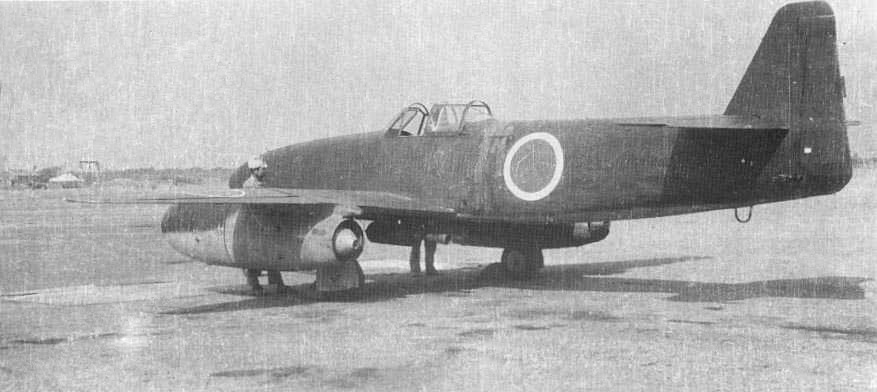
The Nakajima Kikka, equipped with RATO rockets for lift off

The first prototype commenced ground tests at the Nakajima factory on 30 June 1945. The following month, it was dismantled and delivered to Kisarazu Naval Airfield where it was re-assembled and prepared for flight testing. The maiden flight took place on 7 August 1945 (the day after Hiroshima was bombed by atomic bomb), with Lieutenant Commander Susumu Takaoka at the controls. The aircraft performed well during a 20-minute test flight, with the only concern being the length of the takeoff run. For the second test flight, four days later (four days prior to Japan's declaration of surrender), rocket-assisted take-off (RATO) units were fitted to the aircraft. The pilot had been uneasy about the angle at which the rocket tubes had been set, but, with no time to correct them, they decided to simply reduce the thrust of the rockets from 800 kg to only 400 kg. Four seconds into take off the RATO was actuated, immediately jolting the aircraft back onto its tail leaving the pilot with no effective tail control. After the nine-second burning time of the RATO ran out, the nose came down and the nose wheel contacted the runway, resulting in a sudden deceleration, however, both engines were still functioning normally. At this point, the pilot opted to abort the take off but fighting to brake the aircraft and perform a ground loop only put him in danger of running it into other installations. Eventually, the aircraft ran over a drainage ditch, which caught the tricycle landing gear, and the aircraft continued to skid forward and stopped short of the water's edge. Before it could be repaired, Japan had surrendered, and the conflict was over.

At this point, the second prototype was close to completion while approximately 23 additional airframes were at various stages of construction. Five of these, including the third prototype, were two-seat trainers.

=== Postwar ===
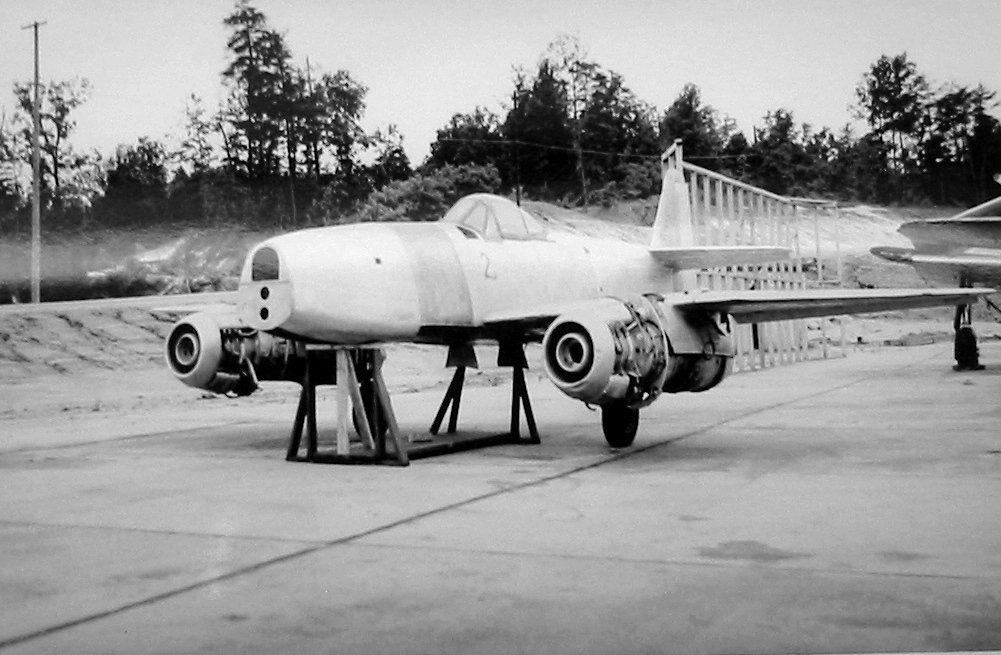
A Kikka stationed at the Patuxent River Naval Air Base, Maryland, 1946

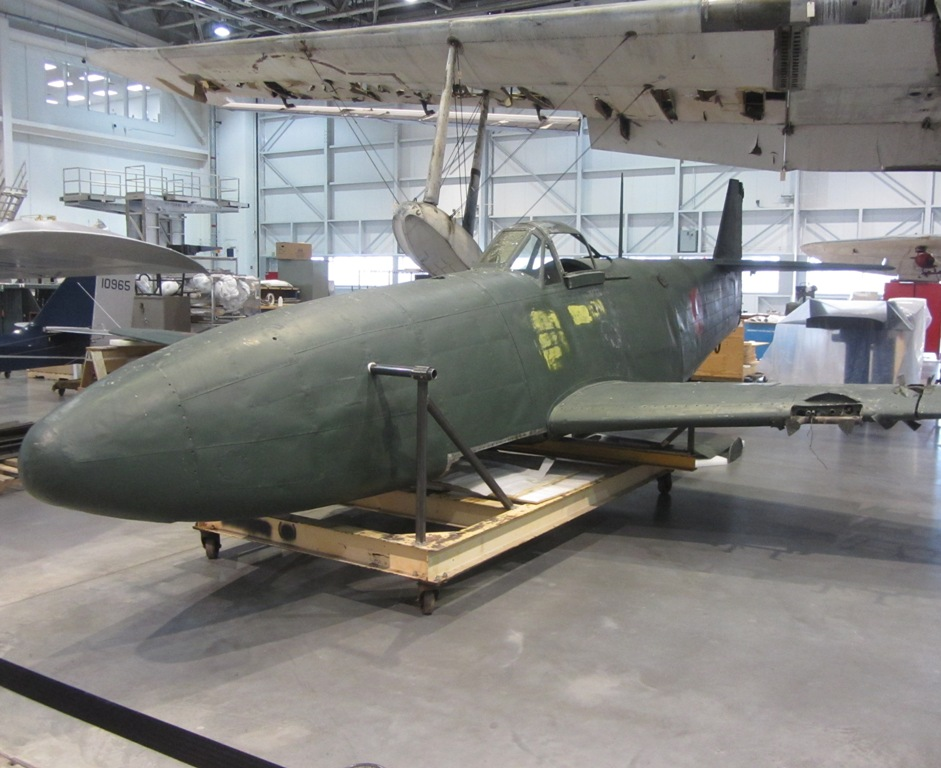
Nakajima Kikka in the Steven F. Udvar-Hazy Center

After the conflict, airframes 3, 4, and 5 (and possibly other partial airframes) were brought to the U.S. for study. Today, two examples survive in the National Air and Space Museum: The first is a Kikka that was taken to the Patuxent River Naval Air Base, Maryland for analysis. This aircraft is very incomplete and is believed to have been patched together from a variety of semi-completed airframes. It is currently still in storage at the Paul E. Garber Preservation, Restoration, and Storage Facility in Silver Hill, Maryland. The second Kikka is on display at the NASM Udvar-Hazy Center in the Mary Baker Engen Restoration Hangar. Correspondence in 2001 with Japanese propulsion specialist Kazuhiko Ishizawa theorized that Nakajima constructed the Museum’s Kikka airframe for load testing, not for flight tests. This may explain why the engine nacelles previously fitted on the Museum’s Kikka airframe are too small to enclose the Ne-20 engines. However, Ishizawa later stated that a limited survey at the Paul E. Garber facility concluded that this Kikka may not be a strength-tester due to the presence of wiring, hydraulics and controls. Furthermore, Susumu Watanabe, who was in charge of engine outfitting for the Kikka, recalled that the engine nacelles of the strength tester were the same as the standard aircraft, and that the strength tester was stressed until failure. Based on this information, the mock nacelles were potentially added for display purposes after transit to the United States.

Two Ne-20 jet engines had been taken to the US and sent for analysis to the Chrysler Corporation in 1946. This was only revealed in 2005 by W. I. Chapman, who was in charge of the project at the time. A working engine was assembled with the parts of the two Ne-20s, and tested for 11 hours and 46 minutes. A report was issued on 7 April 1947, titled "Japanese NE-20 turbo jet engine. Construction and performance". The document is now on display at the Tokyo National Science Museum.

== Variants ==
Nakajima Aircraft Company developed some variants of the aircraft:

Five of the planes under construction at the end of the conflict were to be completed as two-seat trainers. Other follow-on versions proposed included a reconnaissance aircraft and a fighter armed with a pair of 30 mm Type 5 cannons with 50 rounds per gun. The fighter was expected to be powered by a more advanced development of the Ne-20, known as Ne-20 Kai 6.37 kN (650 kgf), which was projected to provide approximately 30 percent greater thrust in comparison to the Ne-20.

== Operators ==
Japan

- Imperial Japanese Navy (planned)

== Specifications (Kikka) ==
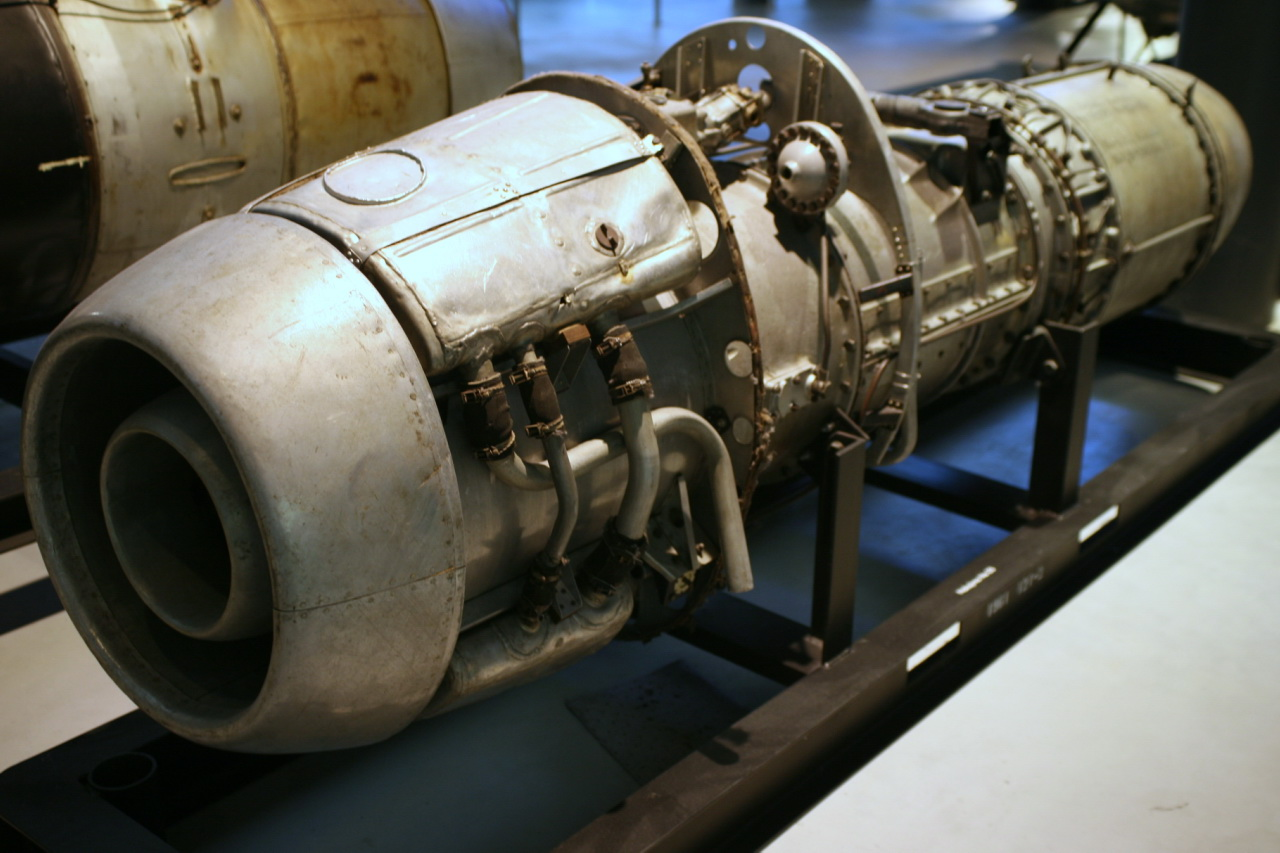
Ne-20 engine taken from the second Kikka prototype on display at the Steven F. Udvar-Hazy Center in Chantilly, Virginia

Data from Kikka, Monogram Close-Up 19, Japanese Aircraft of the Pacific War

General characteristics

- Crew: 1
- Length: 9.25 m (30 ft 4 in)
- Wingspan: 10 m (32 ft 10 in)
- Height: 3.05 m (10 ft 0 in)
- Wing area: 13.2 m^{2} (142 sq ft)
- Airfoil: K125 at root, K309 at tip
- Empty weight: 2,300 kg (5,071 lb)
- Gross weight: 3,550 kg (7,826 lb)
- Max takeoff weight: 4,312 kg (9,506 lb)
- Powerplant: 2 × Ishikawajima Ne-20 axial-flow turbojet engines, 4.66 kN (1,047 lbf) thrust each

Performance

- Maximum speed: 696 km/h (432 mph, 376 kn) at 10,000 m (33,000 ft)
- Range: 948 km (589 mi, 512 nmi)
- Service ceiling: 12,000 m (39,000 ft)
- Time to altitude: 6,000 m (20,000 ft) in 12 minutes with bomb load
- Wing loading: 269 kg/m^{2} (55 lb/sq ft)
- Thrust/weight: 0.27

Armament

- Bombs: 1 × 500 kg (1,102 lb), or 1 × 800 kg (1,764 lb) bomb

== See also ==
Related development

- Nakajima Ki-201

Aircraft of comparable role, configuration, and era

- Bell P-59 Airacomet
- Lockheed P-80 Shooting Star
- Gloster E.28/39
- Gloster Meteor
- Heinkel He 280
- Messerschmitt Me 262
- Mikoyan-Gurevich MiG-9
- Sukhoi Su-9 (1946)

Related lists

- List of aircraft of World War II
- List of jet aircraft of World War II
