= BMW GT 101 =

Gas turbine engine

The BMW GT 101 was a turboshaft-type gas turbine engine developed from the BMW 003 aviation engine, that was considered for installation in Nazi Germany's Panther tank. The German Army's development division, the Heereswaffenamt (Army Ordnance Board), studied a number of gas turbine engines for use in tanks starting in mid-1944. Although none of these was fitted operationally, the GT 101 (GT for "Gas Turbine") reached a production quality stage of development. Several designs were produced over the lifetime of the program, including the GT 102 and GT 103.

== Origins ==
As early as mid-1943 Adolf Müller, formerly of the Junkers Jumo aircraft powerplant division of the parent Junkers aviation firm in Dessau, and then Heinkel-Hirth's (Heinkel Strahltriebwerke) jet engine division, proposed the use of a gas turbine for armored vehicle engines. A gas turbine would be much lighter than the 600 hp-plus class, gasoline-fueled reciprocating piston engines being used in the next-generation tanks, to that time primarily sourced from the Maybach firm for the Wehrmacht Heer's existing armored fighting vehicle designs, that it would considerably improve their power-to-weight ratio and thereby improve cross-country performance, and potentially outright speed. At that time, there were considerable challenges with the use of gas turbine engines in this role, however. In the case of a pure turbojet engine for aviation purposes, the hot exhaust from the turbine is used directly for thrust alone; but in the case of a gas turbine being used for a traction engine, any heat flowing out the exhaust was essentially wasted power. The turbine exhaust was much hotter than that from a piston engine, with pioneering-design gas turbine engines possessing atrociously bad fuel economy figures when compared to traditional reciprocating piston-engine designs. On the upside, the use of inexpensive and widely available kerosene as fuel offset this disadvantage at least to some degree, so the overall economics of running the engines might end up being similar. Another problem was that the gas turbine engine only works well near a particular designed operating speed, although at (or near) that speed it can provide a wide range of output torque. More specifically, turbines offer very little torque at low speeds, which is much less of a problem for a piston engine, and not at all for an electric motor. In order to use a turbine in the tank role, the design would need to use an advanced transmission and clutch that allowed the engine to run at a limited range of speeds, or alternately use some other method to extract power. At first the Army was uninterested, and Müller turned to the design of an advanced turbosupercharger for BMW (it is unclear if this design saw use). When this work was completed in January 1944 he once again turned to the traction engine designs, and eventually met with the Heereswaffenamt in June 1944 to present a number of proposed designs for a 1,000-horsepower unit. Given the extreme problems Germany had with fuel supplies late in the war, use of low-grade fuels, no matter how much of it was needed and used, was actually seen as a major advantage, and the primary reason the Heereswaffenamt eventually became interested in the design.

== Preliminary design ==
Müller's first detailed design was a simple modification to a traditional jet engine, the core engine being based on the experimental Heinkel HeS 011, of which only 19 complete examples were ever built. In this design a separate turbine and power take-off shaft was bolted onto the exhaust of the engine core, the hot gases of the engine powering the turbine, and thus the tank. Since the engine core was separate from the power take-off, torque was available immediately because the core could be left running at full speed while generating small amounts of power, the unneeded gases being "dumped". This design had a serious problem, however; when the load was removed, during gear shifts for instance, the power turbine was unloaded and could race out of control. Either the power turbine had to be braked during these periods, or the gas flow from the engine core had to be dumped.

Another problem was that the Heereswaffenamt was seriously concerned about the quality of the fuels they could find. Unlike the aviation role where it was expected the fuel would be highly refined, it was considered likely the Army would end up with lower-quality fuels that could expected to contain all sorts of heavy contaminants. This led to the possibility that the fuel would not have time to mix properly in a traditional design, leading to poor combustion. They were particularly interested in having the fuel injectors rotate along with the engine core, which could be expected to lead to much better mixing, with the additional benefit of reducing hot spots on the turbine's stators. Unfortunately Müller's design did not appear to be able to be adapted to use these injectors, and the design was eventually rejected on 12 August 1944.

Müller then turned to designs that removed the separate power turbine and instead required some sort of torque-maintaining transmission. The best solution to the problem would have been to drive an electrical generator and use the power to drive motors for traction (a system Porsche had tried to introduce several times), but a serious shortage of copper by this point in the war — as well as its relatively poor quality throughout the war for electrical use, from copper ore resources that Germany could access — ruled out this solution. Instead some sort of hydraulic transmission was to be used, although not initially specified. Additionally, the new design included the rotating fuel injectors in the combustion chamber that the Heereswaffenamt was interested in. Müller presented the new design on 14 September, and the Heereswaffenamt proved considerably more interested – the deteriorating fuel supply situation at this point may have been a factor as well.

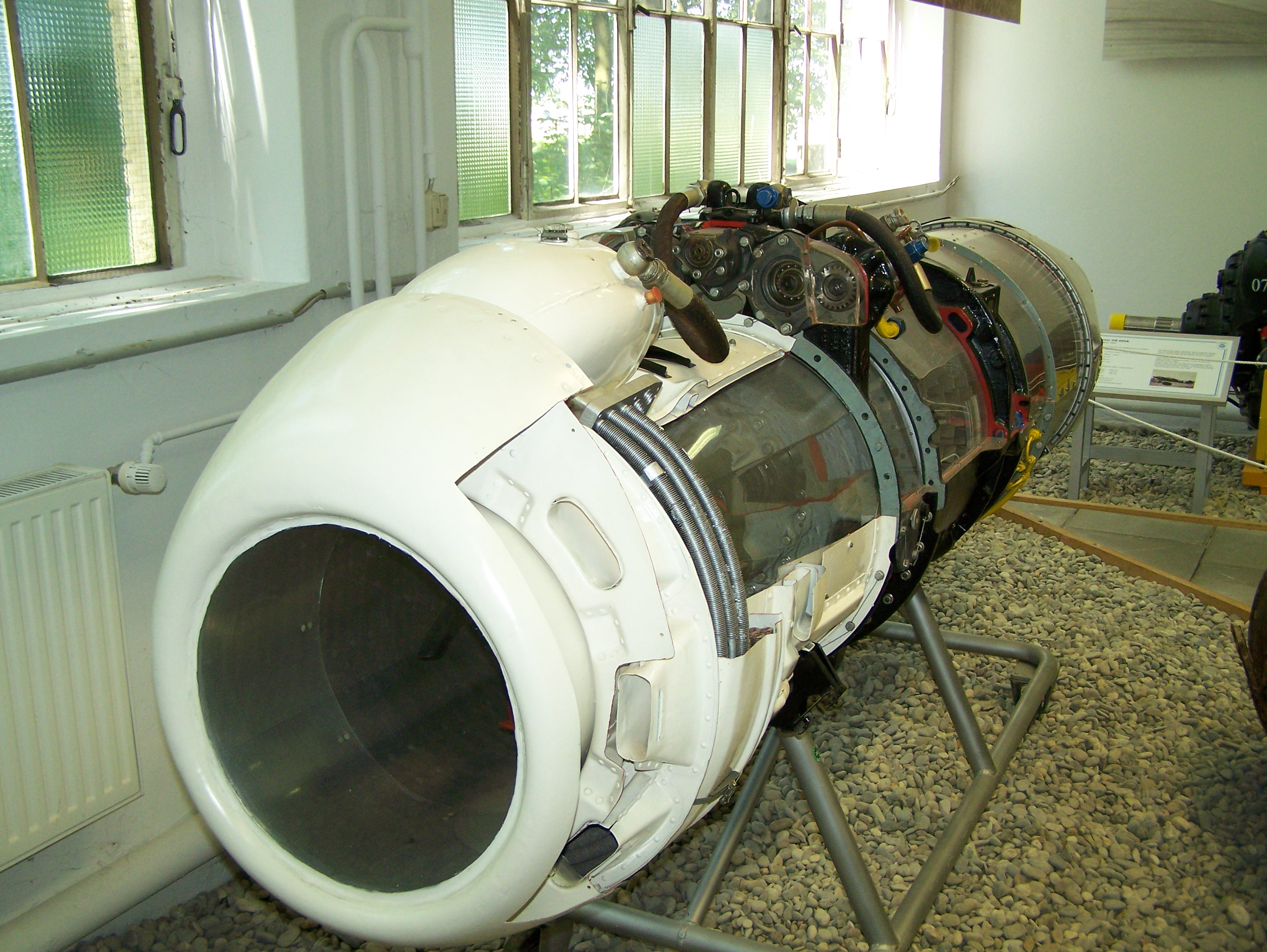
A preserved BMW 003 aviation engine, the basis for the GT 101 turboshaft.

Oddly, they then suggested that any engine core developed for this role should also be suitable for aviation use, which led to the abandonment of the rotating injectors after all, and eventually to the use of a modified BMW 003 core, from a well-proven design. The basic layout had to be modified with the addition of a third bearing near the middle of the engine to help absorb shock loads, and a third turbine stage was added to the end of the engine to harness more torque. Unlike the earlier design, the power-take off could be placed anywhere (not just off the free turbine stage) and was in fact moved to the front of the engine in order to make the design as compatible as possible with existing engine compartments. The basic design was completed in mid-November, and assigned the name GT 101.

Originally they had intended to mount the new engine in the Henschel-designed Tiger tank, but although the engine was smaller, in a diametral manner than the V-12 piston engine it replaced, its beginnings as the axial compressor-based BMW 003 aviation turbojet meant that it was too long to fit in the Tiger I's engine bay. Attention then turned to the Panther, which by this point in the war was to be the basis of all future tank production anyway (see the Entwicklung series for details). For experimental fitting, Porsche provided one of the prototype Jagdtiger hulls.

Fitting of the GT 101 in the Panther hull took some design effort, but eventually a suitable arrangement was found. The engine exhaust was fitted with a large divergent diffuser to lower the exhaust velocity and temperature, which also allowed for a larger third turbine stage. The entire exhaust area extended out of the rear of the engine compartment into "free air", which made it extremely vulnerable to enemy fire, and it was realized this was not practical for a production system.

A new automatic transmission from Zahnradfabrik of Friedrichshafen (ZF) was built for the fitting, it had three clutching levels in the torque converter and twelve speeds. The transmission also included an electrically-operated clutch that mechanically disengaged from the engine completely at 5,000 rpm, below which the engine produced no torque on the output. At full speed, 14,000 rpm, the engine itself also acted in the manner of a huge flywheel, which greatly improved cross-country performance by allowing some of the engine's excess speed to be dumped into the transmission to pull the tank over bumps.

In terms of performance the GT 101 would have been surprisingly effective. It would have produced a total of 3,750 hp, using 2,600 hp to operate the compressor and thus leaving 1,150 hp to power the transmission. The entire engine assembly weighed 450 kg (992 lb), not including the transmission. In comparison, the existing Maybach HL230 P30 it replaced provided 620 hp yet weighed a comparatively huge 1,200 kg (2,646 lb). With the Maybach the Panther had a specific power of about 13.5 hp/ton, with the GT 101 this would improve to 27 hp/ton, outperforming any tank of WWII by a wide margin (for instance, the T-34 was 16.2 hp/tonne) and nearly matching the modern, turboshaft-powered American M1 Abrams tank's own 26.9 hp/ton top rating. For other reasons, essentially wear and tear, speeds for a GT 101-powered Panther would be deliberately limited to those of the gasoline-powered Panthers. The only downsides were poor torque at low power settings, and a fuel consumption about double that of the Maybach, which presented problems in finding enough room for fuel tankage — a similar problem also existed with early German gas turbines used for aircraft propulsion.

== GT 102 ==
While work on the GT 101 continued, Müller proposed another way to build the free-turbine engine that avoided the problems with his original designs. In December 1944 he presented his plans, which were accepted for development as the GT 102.

The basic idea of the GT 102 was to completely separate the power turbine from the engine itself, using the latter as a gas generator. The core engine was run hot enough to power itself and nothing more, no power was taken from the core to drive the tank. Compressed air from the core's compressor, 30% of the overall airflow, was bled off through a pipe to a completely separate two-stage turbine with its own combustion chamber. This avoided the overspeed problems of the original design; when load was removed, simply shutting off the airflow to the turbine would slow it down. This also meant that the core could be run at full speed while the power turbine ran at low speed, providing significantly improved low-speed torque. The only downside to the design was that the power turbine no longer had the huge spinning mass of the GT 101, and thus did not offer any significant flywheel energy storage.

Since the turbine section of the core engine was no longer being fed all of the air from the compressor, it could be built smaller than in the GT 101. This made the engine shorter overall, allowing it to be installed transversely in the upper portion of the Panther's engine compartment, in the wider area above the tracks. The power turbine was then fitted in the empty space below, mounted at a right angle to the engine. This positioned it in-line with the normal transmission, which was located at the front of the vehicle, driving it via a power shaft. The mounting was considerably more practical than the GT 101, and entirely "under armor" as well. Although the GT 102 had fuel economy about equal to the GT 101, the mounting left considerably more empty room within the engine compartment in the space formerly used by the engine cooling system that could be used for new fuel cells, doubling the overall fuel capacity to 1,400 liters and thus providing equal range to the original gasoline engine.

Most of the design work for the GT 102 was complete by early 1945, and the plans were to have been delivered on 15 February (along with final designs for the GT 101). It appears the plans were not delivered, likely due to the deteriorating war condition.

== GT 102 Ausf. 2 ==
In order to further improve the fit of the GT 102 in the Panther, the GT 102 Ausf. 2 design modified several sections of the original gas generator layout to shorten the compressor area and combustion chamber. These were somewhat longer in the GT 102 than they would have been in a comparable aircraft engine in order to allow for better mixing with lower quality fuels. The Ausf. 2 returned these to their original dimensions, and instead re-introduced the rotating fuel injectors from the original pre-GT 101 designs. The compressor was further reduced in length by reducing it from nine to seven stages, but retained the original compression ratio by operating the first stage close to Mach 1. With these reductions in length the engine could be fit lengthwise in the engine compartment, allowing the space above the tracks to be used for fuel storage, as they had originally.

== GT 103 ==
Much of the poor fuel economy of the gas turbine in the traction role was due to the hot exhaust, which essentially represented lost energy. In order to reclaim some of this energy, it is possible to use the hot exhaust to pre-heat the air from the compressor before it flows into the combustion chamber, using a heat exchanger. Although not common, these recuperators are used in a number of applications today.

W. Hryniszak of Brown Boveri in Heidelberg designed a recuperator that was added to the otherwise unmodified GT 102 design to produce the GT 103. The heat exchanger used a rotating porous ceramic cylinder fit into a cruciform duct. Air from the gas generator's exhaust entered the duct outside the cylinder at 500 °C, and blew around the cylinder, heating it and then exhausting at about 350 °C. The ceramic cylinder rotated slowly in order to avoid overheating the "hot" side. Compressed air flowing into the power turbine was piped through the middle of the cylinder, entering at about 180 °C and exiting at about 300 °C.

This meant that 120 °C of the 800 °C final temperature of the air did not have to be provided by the fuel, representing a fairly substantial savings. Estimates suggested an improvement of about 30% in fuel consumption. It was also suggested that a second heat exchanger could be used on the gas generator engine core, saving another 30%. This reduced fuel use by half overall, making it similar to the original gasoline engine. These estimates appear unreasonable in retrospect, although General Motors did experiment with these systems throughout the 1960s and 70s.

== See also ==
Related development

- BMW 003
