= Ishikawajima Ne-20 =

WW2 Japanese turbojet engine

Ne-20
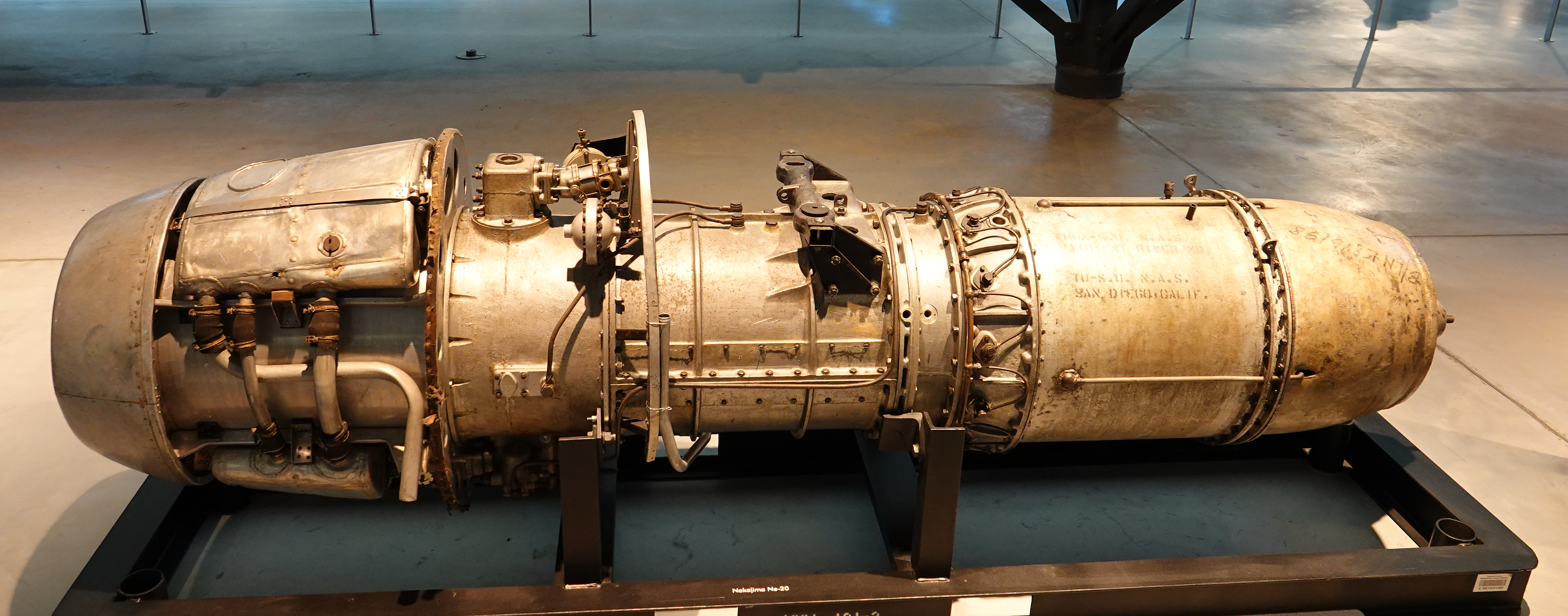
- Ishikawajima Ne-20
- Type: Turbojet
- Manufacturer: Ishikawajima-Harima Heavy Industries
- First run: 1945
- Major applications: Nakajima Kikka
- Number built: c.5

The Ishikawajima Ne-20 (Japanese: 石川島 ネ-20) was Japan's first turbojet engine. It was developed during World War II in parallel with the nation's first military jet, the Nakajima Kikka.

== Design and development ==
The decision to manufacture this engine came about because of the unsuitability of two earlier powerplants selected for the Kikka, the Tsu-11 and the Ne-12.

Only a small number of these engines, perhaps fifty, were produced before the end of the war. Two of them were used to power the Kikka on its only flight on August 7, 1945. Only a few of the engines under construction survived. It was also planned to use the engine to power a version of the Ohka kamikaze weapon, but this was not implemented before the end of the war.

== Variants ==
Ne-20
Standard production engines
Ne-20-Kai
Up-rated version

== Engines on display ==
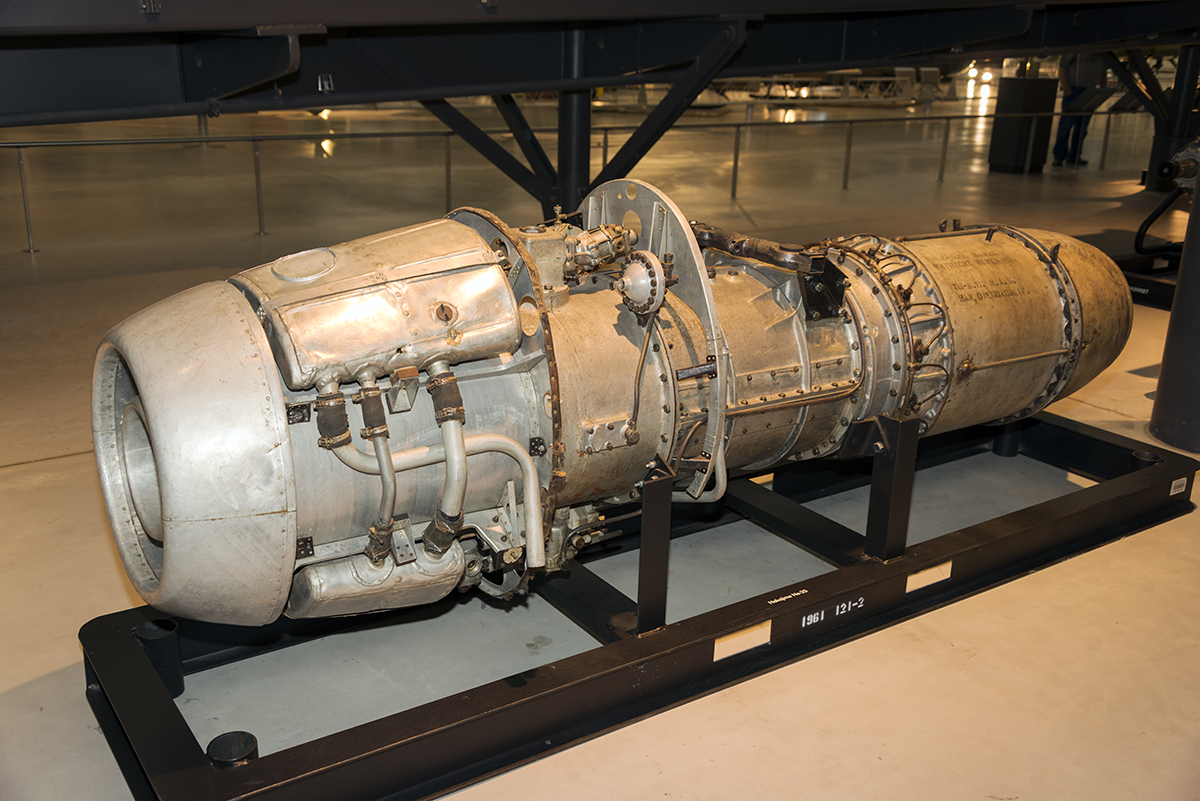
Ishikawajima Ne-20 turbojet on display at Steven F. Udvar-Hazy Center

Three Ne-20s have been preserved to the present day, one at Ishikawajima-Harima's internal company museum in Tanashi, and two at the Smithsonian's National Air and Space Museum in Washington, DC.

== Specifications (Ne-20) ==
Data from Turbojet History and Development 1930–1960 Volume 2:USSR, USA, Japan, France, Canada, Sweden, Switzerland, Italy and Hungary

==== General characteristics ====
- Type: Turbojet engine
- Length: 2720 mm (107 in)
- Diameter: 626 mm (24.5 in)
- Dry weight: 470 kg (1,036 lb)

==== Components ====
- Compressor: 8-stage Axial compressor
- Combustors: Annular combustor
- Turbine: 1-stage axial

==== Performance ====
- Maximum thrust: 476 kgf (4.6 kN / 1,050 lbf) at 11,000 rpm
- Specific fuel consumption: 1.5 lb/(lb h)
- Thrust-to-weight ratio: 1.01

== See also ==
Comparable engines

- BMW 003
- Junkers Jumo 004
- Heinkel HeS 006 — later, more common designation: Heinkel HeS 30

Related lists

- List of aircraft engines

== Bibliography ==
- Goodwin, Mike & Starkings, Peter (2017). Japanese Aero-Engines 1910-1945. Sandomierz, Poland: MMPBooks. ISBN 978-83-65281-32-6.
