= Messerschmitt P.1108 =

Proposed bomber aircraft family by Messerschmitt

Me P.1108

General information
- Type: Jet bomber
- Manufacturer: Messerschmitt
- Status: Never went past the project stage
- Primary user: Luftwaffe

Messerschmitt P.1108 Fernbomber was a design for a jet-propelled bomber developed for the Luftwaffe by Messerschmitt during the last years of Nazi Germany. It was never completed.

== History ==
The P.1108 was designed by Dr. Wurster, to a concept by Dr. Alexander Lippisch. It was to have four Heinkel HeS 011 jet engines placed in the wing near the trailing edge, with intakes under the leading edge and ducting through it. Fully loaded weight was to be 30 tons, and range of 7,000 km (4,300 mi; 3,800 nmi) at a speed of 800–850 km/h (500–530 mph; 430–460 kn) and a height of 9,000–12,000 m (30,000–39,000 ft).

While not a true flying wing, it was tailless (with only a stabilizing fin and rudder).

While the Fedden Mission was told about the project, none of the information provided by Messerschmitt's employees could be independently verified, since all data had already been removed by the French. No aircraft were completed.

== Sources ==
- Christopher, John. The Race for Hitler's X-Planes. The Mill, Gloucestershire: History Press, 2013.
