= BMW 109-718 =

1940s German aircraft rocket engine

- Type: Liquid-propellant rocket (assist unit)
- Manufacturer: BMW
- Number built: 20

The BMW 109-718 was a liquid-fuelled rocket engine developed by BMW at their Bruckmühl facility, in Germany during the Second World War.

== Development ==
The 109-718 (109 prefix number for the Reichsluftfahrtministerium, or RLM, designation used for all reaction-propulsion [rocket and gas turbine] aviation engine projects) was designed as an assist rocket for aircraft, for rapid takeoffs or to enable them to achieve high-speed sprints, akin to what Americans called "mixed power" postwar. It was combined with a standard BMW 003 jet engine, placed atop the rear turbine casing of the jet engine to create a new variant of it, the 003R, providing a total of 1,250 kg (2,760 lb) thrust at full power apiece; it was expected the units would be fitted in pairs. Unlike most RATO boosters, (Note: Such as the parachute-droppable and reusable Walter HWK 109-500) the liquid-fuelled 718 rocket engine system comprising the second propulsive source of an 003R engine remained with the airframe at all times.

The rocket motor had internal and external main chambers which were cooled by the nitric acid oxidiser, fed through a coiled spiral tube. The centrifugal fuel pumps (operating at 17,000rpm) delivered a mix of nitric acid oxidiser and hydrocarbon fuel at 735 psi (50.7 bar), (Note: Christopher (2013) calls it 50 atmospheres.) a rate of 5.5 kg (12 lb) per 1,000 kg (2,200 lb) thrust per second. The 718's fuel pumps were driven by a power take-off from the jet engine which ran at 3,000 rpm. The complete unit weighed 80 kg (180 lb).

Before war's end, a Messerschmitt Me 262C-2b Heimatschützer II (Home Defender II, one of four different planned designs of the rocket-boosted Me 262 C-series) was tested with a pair of 718s — each as a part of a pair of the BMW 003R "mixed-power" propulsion units — climbing to 9,150 m (30,020 ft) in just three minutes. The 109-718 was also tested aboard an He 162E, although records do not indicate the results of this test.

The Germans hoped the rocket might eventually rely on the same fuel as jet aircraft.

Only twenty 109-718 engines were completed by war's end, each taking some 100 hours to complete.

== Specifications ==
Data from The Race for Hitler's X-Planes: Britain's 1945 Mission to Capture Secret Luftwaffe Technology

==== General characteristics ====
- Type: Liquid-propellant rocket
- Length:
- Diameter:
- Dry weight:

==== Components ====
- Compressor:
- Combustors: Catalyst ignited or Hypergolic combustion in a single combustion chamber
- Fuel type: Diesel fuel and red fuming nitric acid (RFNA / S-Stoff) oxidiser with injected catalyst or R-stoff / SV-stoff fuel and oxidiser

==== Performance ====
- Maximum thrust: 12.2625 kN (2,756.7 lbf)
- Specific fuel consumption: 0.561 kg/kN/s (12.125 lb/lbf/s), which translates to an ISP of 181.75 (s), probably at sea level

== Bibliography ==
- Christopher, John (2013). The Race for Hitler's X-Planes: Britain's 1945 Mission to Capture Secret Luftwaffe Technology. Stroud, UK: History Press. ISBN 978-0-7524-6457-2.
