= BMW 018 =

German turbojet engine

- Type: Turbojet
- National origin: Germany
- Manufacturer: BMW
- Number built: 3
- Developed from: BMW 003

The BMW 018 (RLM designation 109-018) was an early axial-flow turbojet engine project by BMW AG in Germany.

== Design ==
The 018 design was begun in 1940. It was generally similar to the BMW 003, but had a twelve-stage axial compressor and three-stage turbine, for a thrust of 34.3 kN (7,700 lbf).

Three engines were at various stages of completion at Staßfurt, but due to continuing efforts toward protracted development of the 003 along with Allied bombing and the liberation of France, official 018 development was stopped in late 1944. On BMW's own initiative, it was decided that the existing 018 development examples would be moved to a pair of successive locations in Bavaria; to Kolbermoor to finish construction, and then move them to Oberwiesenfeld for testing. Despite this planning, the rapidly deteriorating war situation of March 1945 prompted BMW personnel to destroy the engines and their components in order to prevent them from falling into Allied hands.

It was estimated that 50 h/p starter (2 cycle, air-cooled gasoline engine) would be required for the BMW 018 and 028.

== Specifications ==
Data from Christopher, p. 74

==== General characteristics ====
- Type: axial flow turbine
- Length: 4,190 mm (165 in)
- Diameter: 1,252 mm (49.3 in)
- Dry weight: 2,295 kg (5,060 lb)

==== Components ====
- Compressor: 12-stage
- Combustors: annular
- Turbine: 3-stage

==== Performance ====
- Maximum thrust: 34.3 kN (7,700 lbf)
- Thrust-to-weight ratio: 1.52

== See also ==
Related development

- BMW 003
- SNECMA Atar

Comparable engines

- Westinghouse J40

Related lists

- List of aircraft engines

== Bibliography ==
- Christopher, John (2013). The Race for Hitler's X-Planes: Britain's 1945 Mission to Capture Secret Luftwaffe Technology. Stroud, UK: History Press. ISBN 978-0-7524-6457-2.
- Gunston, Bill (2006). World Encyclopedia of Aero Engines: From the Pioneers to the Present Day (5th ed.). Stroud, UK: Sutton. ISBN 0-7509-4479-X.
- Kay, Anthony L. (2002). German Jet Engine and Gas Turbine Development 1930–1945. The Crowood Press. ISBN 1-84037-294-X.
- Kay, Anthony L. (2007). Turbojet History and Development 1930–1960. Vol. 1. Ramsbury: The Crowood Press. ISBN 978-1-86126-912-6.
