= Yokosuka MXY-7 Ohka =

Japanese rocket suicide-attack aircraft

MXY-7 Ohka
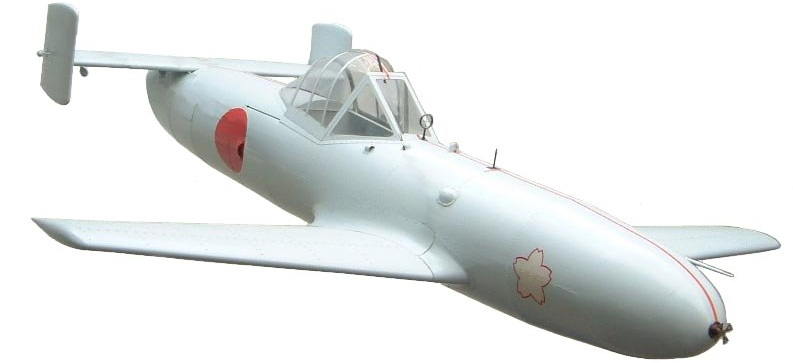
- Ohka Model 11 replica at the Yasukuni Shrine Yūshūkan war museum.

General information
- Type: Kamikaze (piloted suicide) anti-ship aircraft / missile
- National origin: Japan
- Manufacturer: Yokosuka Naval Air Technical Arsenal
- Status: Retired
- Primary user: Imperial Japanese Navy Air Service
- Number built: 852

History
- Manufactured: 1944–1945
- Introduction date: 1945
- First flight: 21 March 1944 (unpowered), November 1944 (powered).
- Retired: 1945

The Yokosuka MXY-7 Ohka (櫻花, Ōka; "cherry blossom"; 桜花 in modern orthography) is a purpose-built, rocket-powered, human-guided, kamikaze attack aircraft that was produced by the Yokosuka Naval Air Technical Arsenal and deployed by Japan toward the end of World War II. Allied personnel commonly referred to the aircraft as "baka bombs" (baka being a Japanese pejorative term meaning "fool" or "idiot").

The Ohka was conceived during 1943 by Ensign Mitsuo Ohta, and following design assistance from the Aeronautical Research Institute of the University of Tokyo, received formal approval to proceed from the Imperial Japanese Navy (IJN) on 16 August 1944. Development was carried out in secret, partially to not impact the Japanese public's perception of the conflict. Effectively a flying bomb, the Ohka was intentionally designed to be as cheap as possible to construct, typically featuring plywood wings and an aluminium fuselage, while only being furnished with rudimentary cockpit instrumentation. While initially planned to be produced entirely in-house by the military, the high rate of production desired by military planners eventually necessitated the production of the wings and tail units to be subcontracted out to private firms, such as the Nippon Aircraft Company. The IJN ordered full-rate production to proceed ahead of powered flights being performed in November 1944.

The principal variant, and the only one to see combat, was the Model 11; it was armed with a 1,200 kg (2,600 lb) warhead and was powered by three Type 4 Model 1 Mark 20 solid-fuel rocket motors. Starting on 21 March 1945, the Ohka flew combat missions against Allied ships in the Pacific Theater. Although extremely fast, the Ohka had a very short range of 37 km (20 nmi; 23 mi), thus it had to be carried into action as a parasite aircraft by a much larger bomber that frequently proved to be vulnerable to carrier-borne fighters. The Ohka participated in the Battle of Okinawa of 1945, during which it succeeded in sinking or damaging several escort vessels and transport ships, although it was never attributed as having heavily damaged any capital ships. The Japanese developed several versions of the Ohka, including the K-1 unpowered trainer aircraft and the turbojet-powered Model 22. While efforts were made to overcome the aircraft's shortcomings, particularly its short range, the Surrender of Japan came before any of the improved combat models saw deployment.

== Design and development ==
=== Background ===
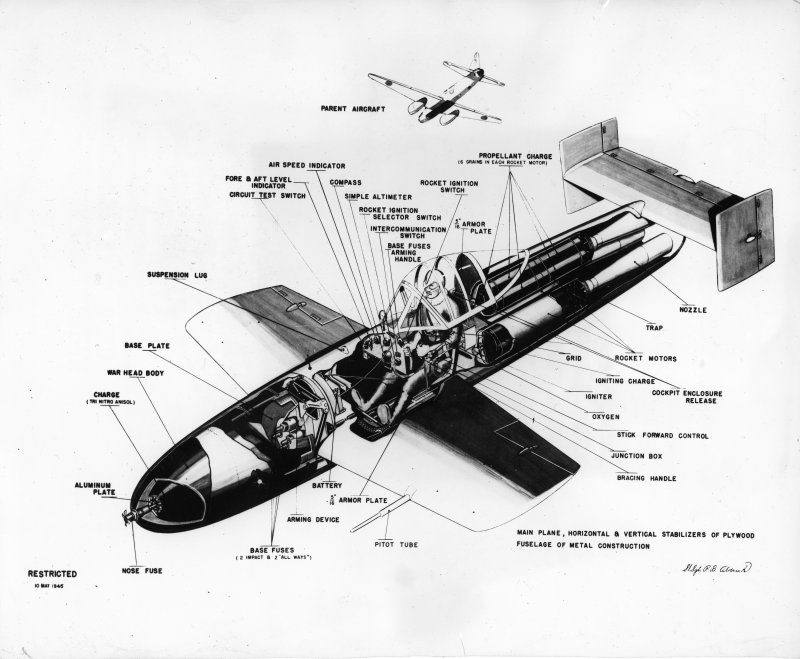
Labelled diagram of a Yokosuka MXY-7 Ohka

The MXY-7 Navy Suicide Attacker Ohka was a manned flying bomb that was conceived by Ensign Mitsuo Ohta of the 405th Kōkūtai, who had witnessed the multiple air attacks by the Allies and observed that the defensive efforts of the IJN had been decreasing in effectiveness, thus resolving to design an expendable kamikaze aircraft purpose-built for suicide attacks upon enemy warships. While Ohta had started work on the design in 1943, the authorities did not take an interest until the following year. Ohta obtained design assistance from several figures at the Aeronautical Research Institute at the University of Tokyo, which included the construction of a scale model and wind-tunnel tests. This involvement of civilian engineers by Ohta ahead of approaching his superiors was likely a violation of protocol, but this infraction seemingly was overlooked.

Having integrated the data from the university's research, on 5 August 1944, Ohta submitted his proposal at the First Navy Aeronautical Technology Arsenal. Eleven days later, the IJN General Staff ordered engineers at the Navy Aeronautical Research Department at Yokosuka to commence formal development of the concept. From this point, development of the Ohka was carried out in secret, headed by Lieutenant Commander Yamana Masao, while Major Miki Tadanao served as chief designer. Part of the reason for such secrecy was to avoid the spreading of awareness at Japan's military circumstances to be developing such an aircraft. This desire led to the early dismissal of interest in the subcontracting of production work to the private sector; instead, production was initially exclusively confined to military facilities. The designation Marudai was assigned to the project, which was partially based on the first ideograph in Ohta's name. Less than one month was needed to produce the first prototype, as well as 10 production-standard aircraft by the end of September 1944, which were referred to as the Yokosuka MXY-7 Model 11.

Both due to the single-use nature of the aircraft and the resource shortages present across Japan's wider economy towards the end of the conflict, considerable pressure existed to design the Ohka to be as affordable as possible. IJN decided that the Model 11 would primarily composed of aluminium and plywood, materials that were both readily available and could be used by unskilled labourers. While the fuselage was composed of aluminium, both the wing and tail assemblies were made of plywood; the cockpit was enclosed by a plexiglass canopy, and only rudimentary instrumentation was provided (a speedometer, altimeter, and attitude indicator).

In October 1944, glide testing started at Sagami Bay, just south of Tokyo; powered trials commenced one month later. Irrespective of the results of these trials, the IJN already had ordered full-rate production to proceed. While officials had sought 150 aircraft to be produced by the end of November, the Naval Aeronautical Technology Institute proved to be incapable of production at such a rate. Accordingly, in spite of the strong sentiment that the Ohka's production should solely remain a military matter, the IJN was compelled to subcontract work to private firms, such as the Nippon Aircraft Company, to produce wings and tail sections for the aircraft.

=== Production models ===
The only operational variant of the Ohka was the Model 11. It was essentially a 1,200 kg (2,600 lb) bomb with wooden wings, powered by three Type 4 Model 1 Mark 20 solid-fuel rocket motors, the Model 11 achieved great speed, but with limited range. This was problematic, as it required the slow, heavily laden mother aircraft to approach within 37 km (20 nmi; 23 mi) of the target, making it vulnerable to defending fighters. Some 155 Ohka Model 11s were produced at Yokosuka, and another 600 were built at the Kasumigaura Naval Air Arsenal. A single experimental variant of the Model 11, referred to as the Model 21, had thin steel wings manufactured by Nakajima, a combination of the engine of the Model 11 and the airframe of the Model 22.

Operationally, the Ohka was usually carried underneath a Mitsubishi G4M2e Model 24J "Betty" bomber to within range of its target. On release, the pilot would first glide towards the target and when close enough, he would fire the Ohka's three Type 4 Model 1 Mark 20 solid-fuel rocket motors, one at a time or in unison, and fly the missile towards the ship that he intended to destroy. The final approach was difficult for a defender to stop because the aircraft gained high speed (650 km/h (400 mph) in level flight and 930 km/h (580 mph) or even 1,000 km/h (620 mph) in a dive. Later versions were designed to be launched from coastal air bases and caves, and even from submarines equipped with aircraft catapults, although none was actually used in this way. The Allen M. Sumner-class destroyer USS Mannert L. Abele was the first Allied ship to be sunk by Ohka aircraft, near Okinawa, on 12 April 1945. Over the course of the conflict, Ohkas sank or damaged beyond repair three ships and significantly damaged three more U.S. ships.

The Ohka pilots, members of the Jinrai Butai (Thunder Gods Corps), are honored in Japan at Ohka Park in Kashima City, the Ohka Monument in Kanoya City, the Kamakura Ohka Monument at Kenchō-ji Zen temple in Kamakura, Kanagawa, and the Yasukuni Shrine in Tokyo.

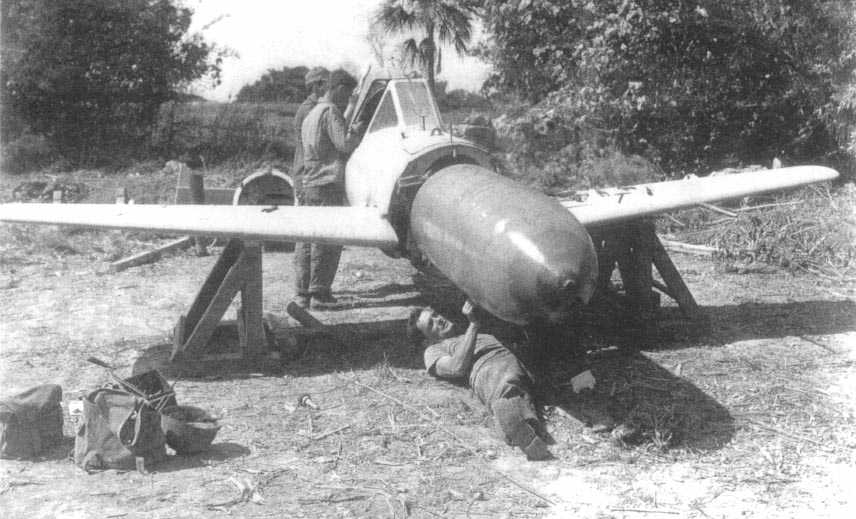
U.S. personnel disarming the warhead of an Ohka, Yontan Airfield, Okinawa, April 1945

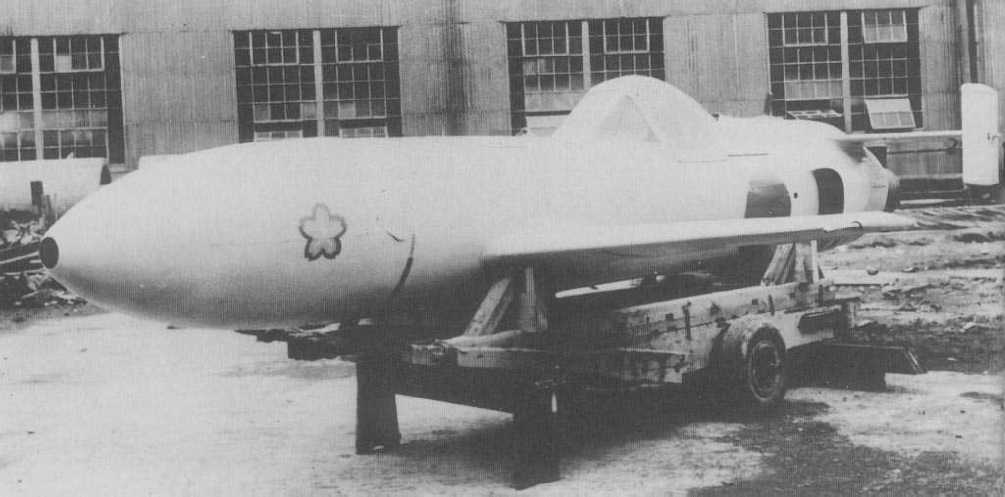
Thermojet-powered Model 22, note the jet intake on the side just forward of the tail.

The Ohka K-1 was an unpowered trainer version with water ballast in place of a warhead and engines that was used to provide pilots with handling experience. Unlike the combat aircraft, it was furnished with flaps and a landing skid. The water ballast would be dumped prior to landing. The K-1 remained a challenging aircraft to fly, possessing a relatively high landing speed of 130 mph (210 km/h); only 45 K-1s were produced by Dai-Ichi Kaigun Koku Gijitsusho.

The Model 22 was designed to overcome the short standoff-distance problem by using a Campini-type motorjet engine, the Ishikawajima Tsu-11, giving a level speed of only 276 mph (444 km/h) at 4,000 m (13,000 ft), but extending the range to 81 mi (130 km). This engine was successfully tested, and 50 Model 22 Ohkas were built at Yokosuka to accept this engine. The Model 22 was to be launched by the more agile Yokosuka P1Y3 Ginga "Frances" bomber, necessitating a shorter wingspan and much smaller 600-kilogram (1,300 lb) warhead. The first flight of a Model 22 Ohka took place in June 1945; none appear to have been used operationally, and only about 20 of the experimental Tsu-11 engines are known to have been produced.

The Model 33 was a larger version of the Model 22 powered by an Ishikawajima Ne-20 turbojet with an 800 kg (1,800 lb) warhead. The launch aircraft was to be the Nakajima G8N Renzan, but the Model 33 was cancelled due to the likelihood that the Renzan would not be available.

Other unbuilt planned variants were the Model 43A with folding wings, to be launched from submarines, and the Model 43B, a catapult/rocket-assisted version, also with folding wings so that it could be hidden in caves. A trainer version was also under development for this version, the two-seat Model 43 K-1 Kai Wakazakura (Young Cherry), fitted with a single rocket motor. In place of the warhead, a second seat was installed for the student pilot. Two of this version were built. Finally, the Model 53 would also use the Ne-20 turbojet, but was to be towed like a glider and released near its target.

== Operational history ==
On 21 March 1945, the first operational use of the Ohka took place, involving a total of 18 G4M motherships; this attack was unsuccessful due to fighter interception, resulting in the loss of all G4Ms along with 26 of the 30 escort fighters. It was used mostly against U.S. ships invading Okinawa, and if launched from its mothership, it could be effective because of its high speed in the dive. In the first two attempts to transport the Ohkas to Leyte Gulf using aircraft carriers, the carriers Shinano and Unryu were sunk by the U.S. submarines Archerfish and Redfish.

Attacks intensified during April 1945. On 1 April 1945, six G4Ms attacked the U.S. fleet off Okinawa. At least one aircraft made a successful attack; its Ohka was thought to have hit one of the 406 mm (16 in) turrets on the battleship West Virginia, causing moderate to extensive damage. However, postwar analysis indicated that no hits but a near miss had been recorded. The transports Alpine, Achernar, and Tyrrell were also hit by kamikaze aircraft, but whether any of these were Ohkas from the other G4Ms is unclear. None of the G4Ms returned.

The U.S. military quickly realized the danger and concentrated on extending their "defensive rings" outward to intercept the G4M/Ohka combination aircraft before the suicide mission could be launched. On 12 April 1945, nine G4Ms attacked the U.S. fleet off Okinawa; the destroyer Mannert L. Abele was hit during this attack, causing her to break in two and sink. Jeffers destroyed an Ohka with AA fire 45 m (50 yd) from the ship, but the resulting explosion was still powerful enough to cause extensive damage, forcing Jeffers to withdraw. The destroyer Stanly was attacked by two Ohkas; one struck above the waterline just behind the ship's bow, its charge passing completely through the hull and splashing into the sea, where it detonated underwater, causing little damage to the ship, while the other Ohka narrowly missed, its pilot probably killed by AA fire, and crashed into the sea, knocking off the Stanly's ensign in the process. One Betty returned. On 14 April 1945, seven G4Ms attacked the U.S. fleet off Okinawa. None returned. None of the Ohkas appeared to have been launched. Two days later, six G4Ms attacked the U.S. fleet off Okinawa. Two returned, but no Ohkas had hit their targets. Later, on 28 April 1945, four G4Ms attacked the U.S. fleet off Okinawa at night. One returned. No hits were recorded.

May 1945 saw another series of attacks. On 4 May 1945, seven G4Ms attacked the U.S. fleet off Okinawa. One Ohka hit the bridge of a destroyer, Shea, causing extensive damage and casualties. Gayety was also damaged by an Ohka's near miss. One G4M returned. On 11 May 1945, four G4Ms attacked the U.S. fleet off Okinawa. The destroyer Hugh W. Hadley was hit and suffered extensive damage and flooding, and was judged beyond repair. On 25 May 1945, 11 G4Ms attacked the fleet off Okinawa. Bad weather forced most of the aircraft to turn back, and none of the others hit targets.

On 22 June 1945, six G4Ms attacked the fleet. Two returned, but no hits were recorded. Postwar analysis concluded that the Ohka's impact was negligible, since no U.S. Navy capital ships had been hit during the attacks because of the effective defensive tactics that were employed. In total, of the 300 Ohka available for the Okinawa campaign, 74 actually undertook operations, of which 56 were either destroyed with their parent aircraft or in making attacks. The Allied nickname for the aircraft was "baka", a Japanese word meaning "foolish" or "idiotic".

== Variants ==
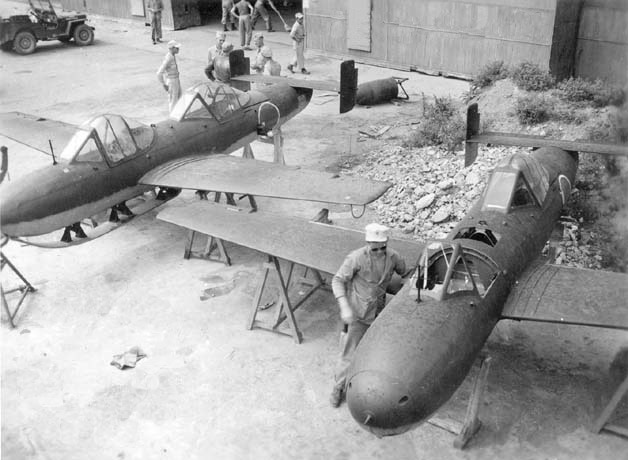
Model 43 K-1 Kai rocket assist trainers; note the landing skid.

MXY-7
Rocket powered suicide attacker, unpowered glider prototypes; ten built

Navy Suicide Attacker Ohka Model 11
Long designation of the operational attacker

Ohka Model 11
Suicide attacker powered by 3 × 2.616 kN (588 lbf) Navy Type 4 Mark 1 Model 20 solid-fueled rocket motors, firing for 8–10 seconds; 755 built

Ohka Model 21
Suicide attacker, fitted with steel-built wings built by Nakajima; one built

Ohka Model 22
Suicide attacker, powered by an Ishikawajima Tsu-11 thermo-jet engine with reduced span wings and 600 kg (1,300 lb) warhead, to be carried by Yokosuka P1Y1 Ginga bombers. 50 built by the First Naval Air Technical Arsenal (第一海軍航空技術廠, Dai-Ichi Kaigun Koku Gijitsusho)

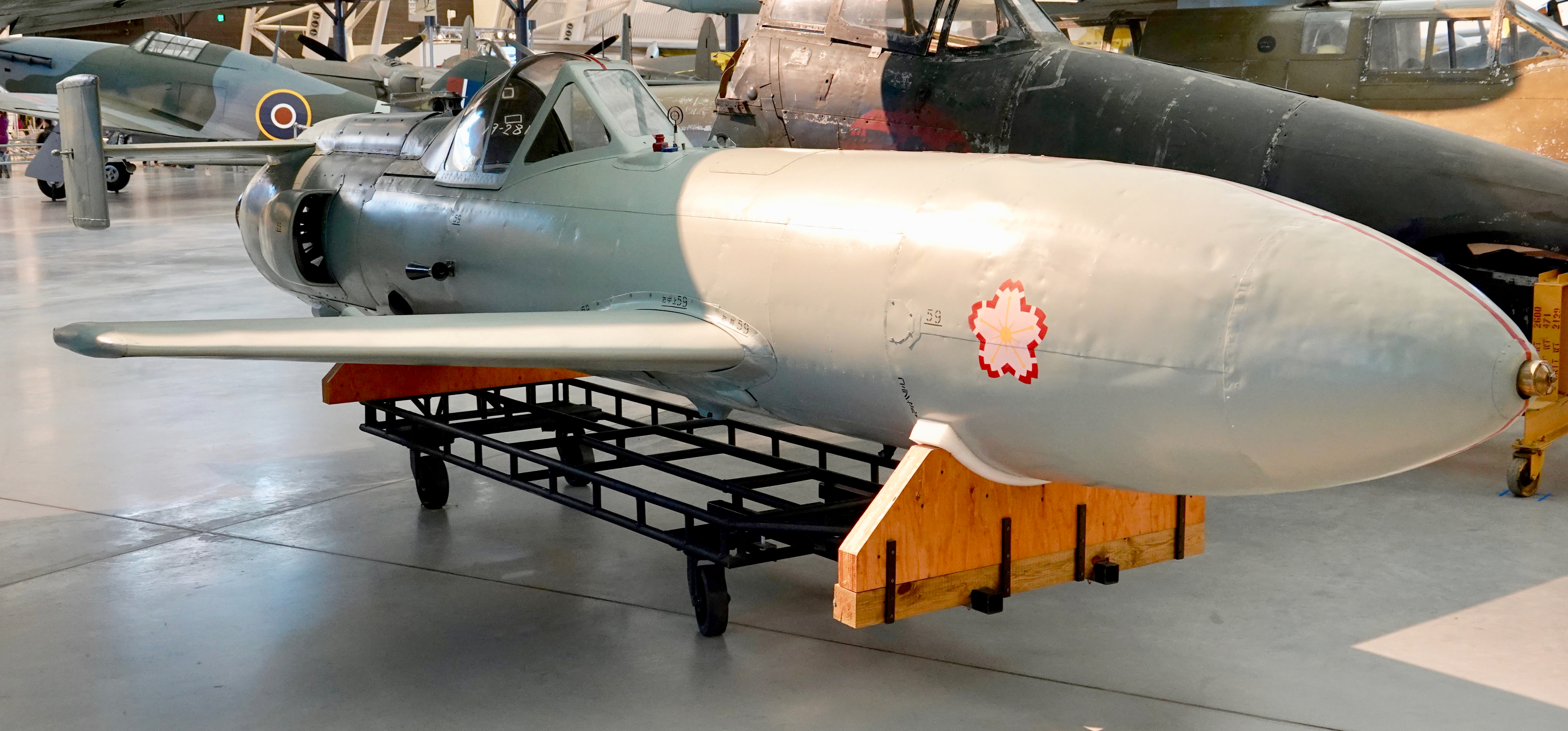
Kugisho MXY7 Ohka Model 22

Ohka Model 33
Suicide attacker, powered by an Ishikawajima Ne-20 turbojet engine, with an 800 kg (1,800 lb) warhead, to be carried by the Nakajima G8N1 Renzan bomber

Ohka Model 43A Ko
Suicide attacker, powered by a Ne-20 turbojet engine, with folding wings, to be catapult launched from submarines - unbuilt

Ohka Model 43B Otsu
Suicide attacker similar to the Model 43A for catapult launching from caves - unbuilt

Ohka Model 53
Suicide attacker for aerotow launch, powered by a Ne-20 turbojet engine

Ohka K-1
Suicide attack training glider

Ohka Model 43 K-1 Kai Wakazakura (若桜; "Young Cherry")
Two-seat suicide attack glider trainer with flaps and retractable skid undercarriage, fitted with a single Type 4 Mark 1 Model 20 rocket motor, for limited powered flight

"Suzuka-24" (Japanese designation unknown)
Alleged interceptor version with warhead replaced by a fuel tank for a Ne-20 jet engine and two 20 mm autocannon (Unknown Ho-5 or Type 99 with 60 / 150 rounds per gun) mounted on top. Supposedly employed at least twice against B-29 formations in April 1945

== Surviving aircraft ==
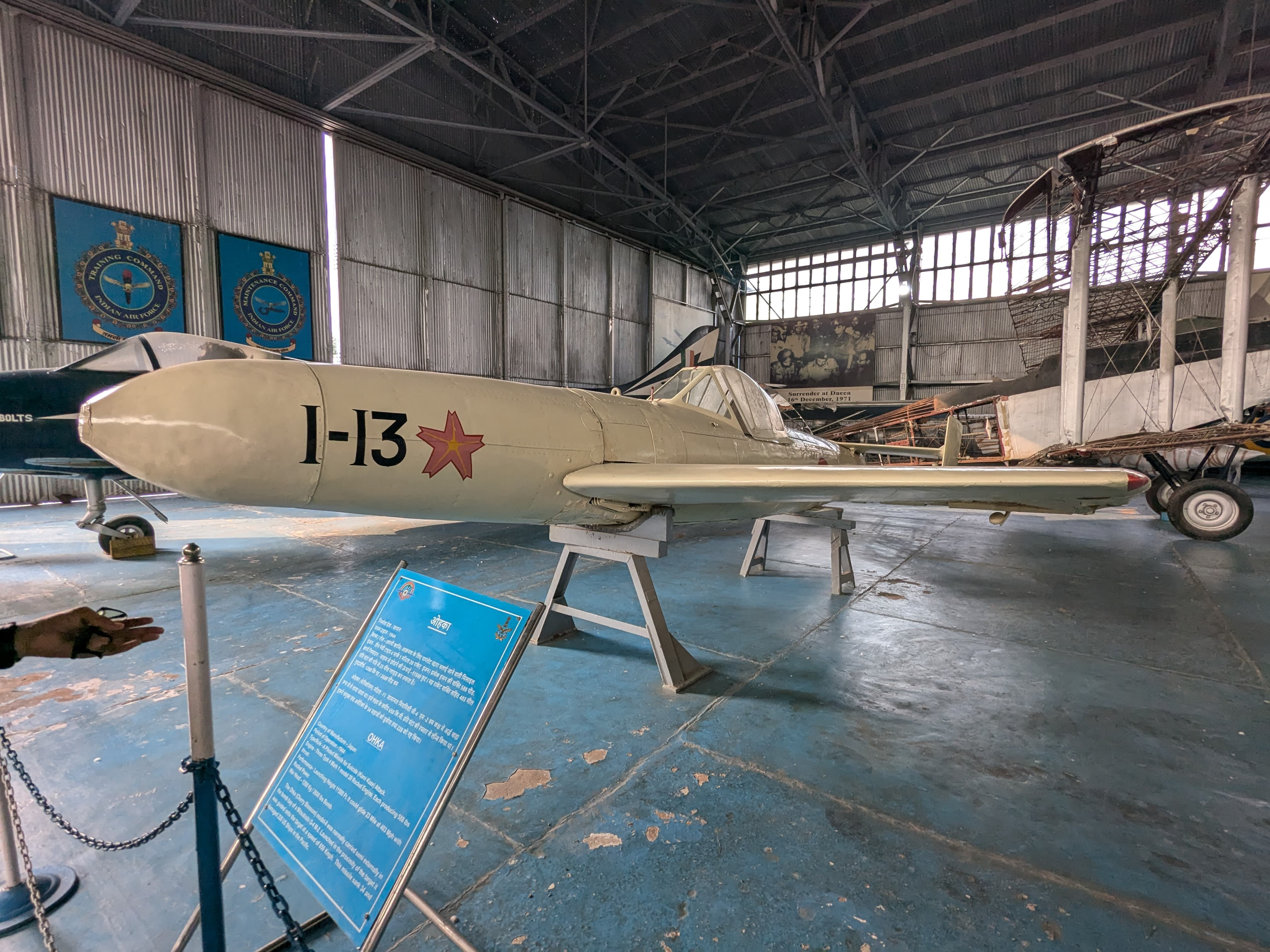
Yokosuka MXY7 Ohka Model 11, on display at Indian Air Force Museum, Palam, New Delhi, India

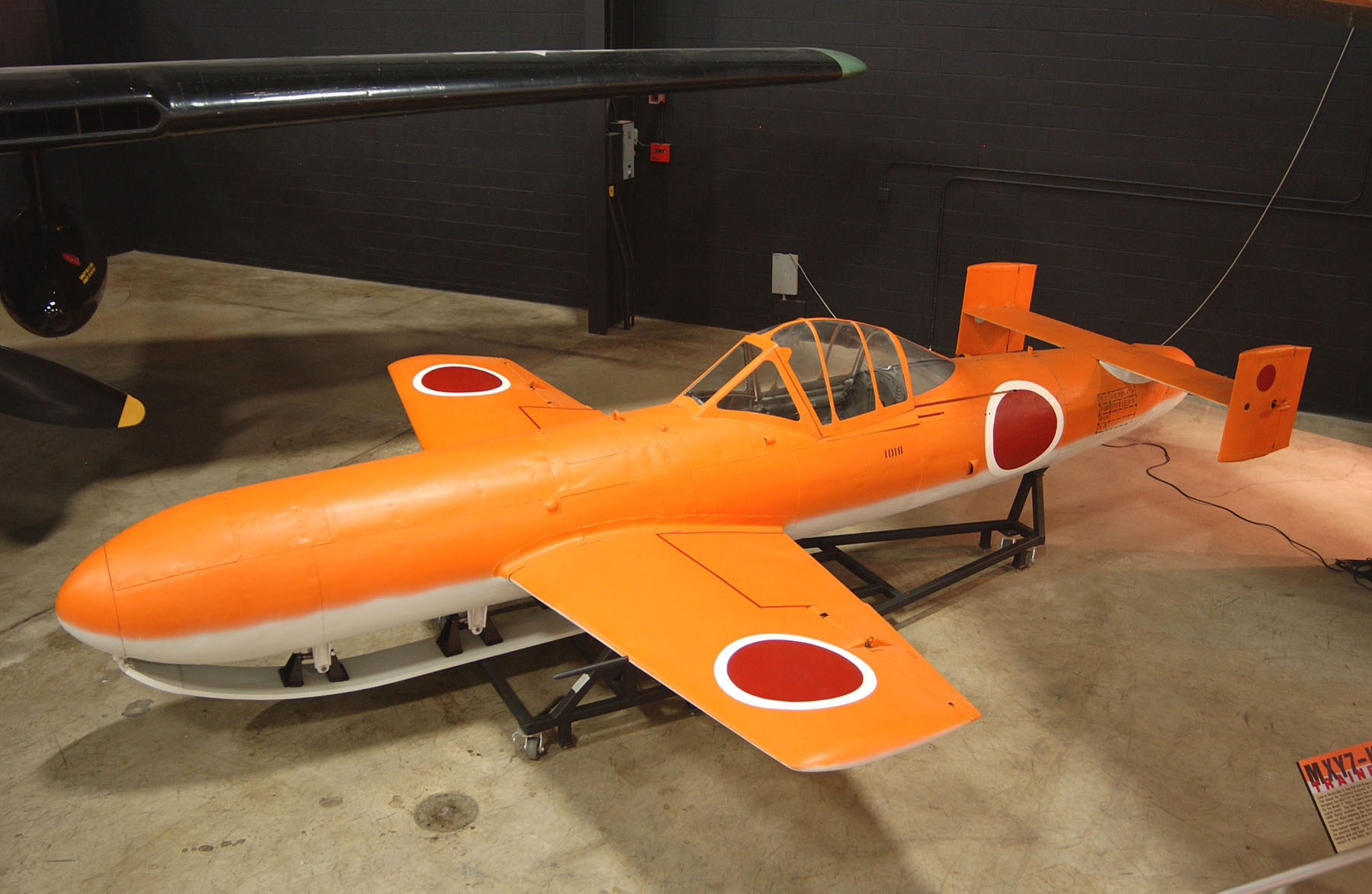
K-1 Ohka Trainer, National Museum of the U.S. Air Force

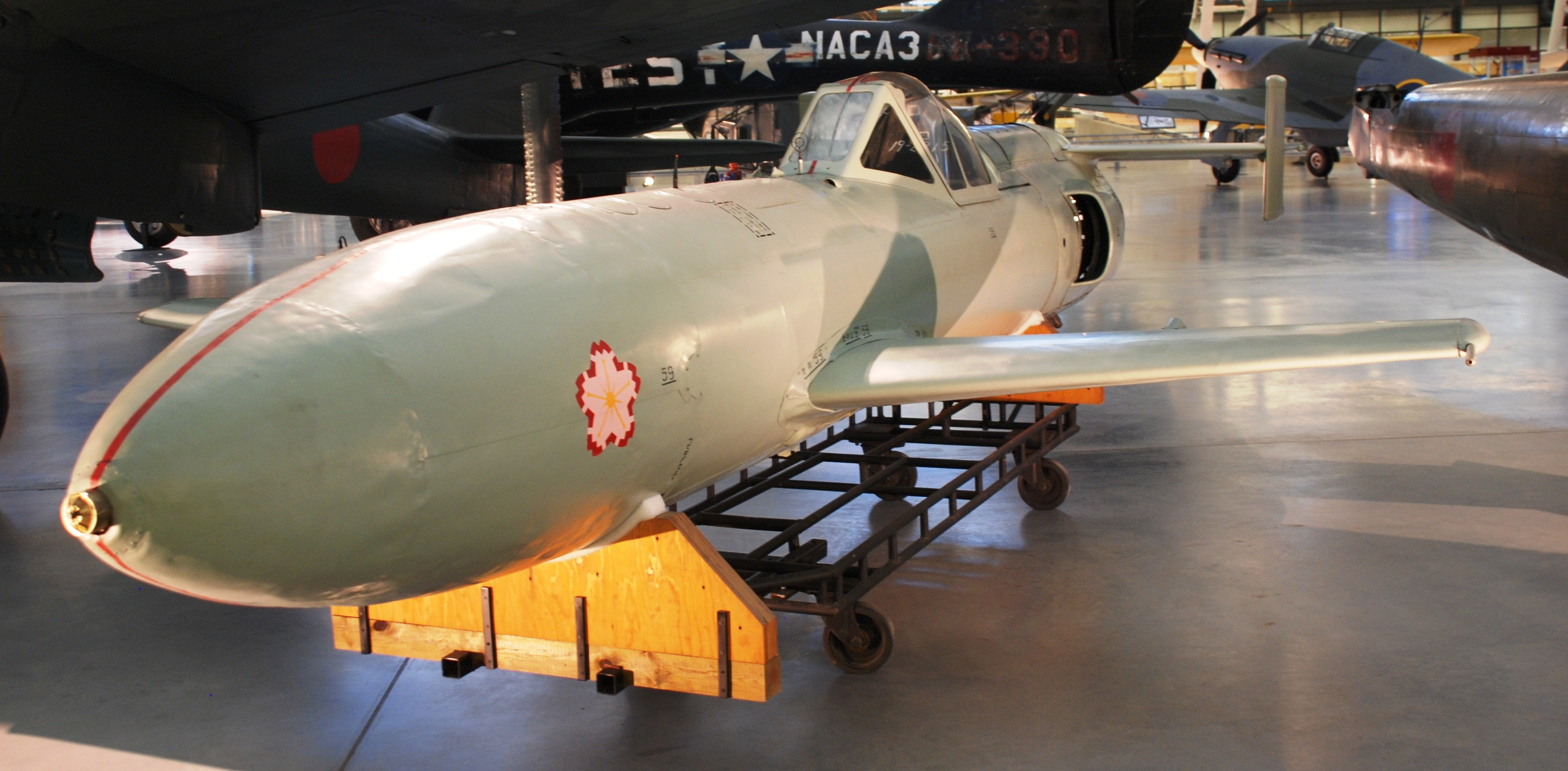
Thermojet powered, Model 22 Ohka. National Air and Space Museum

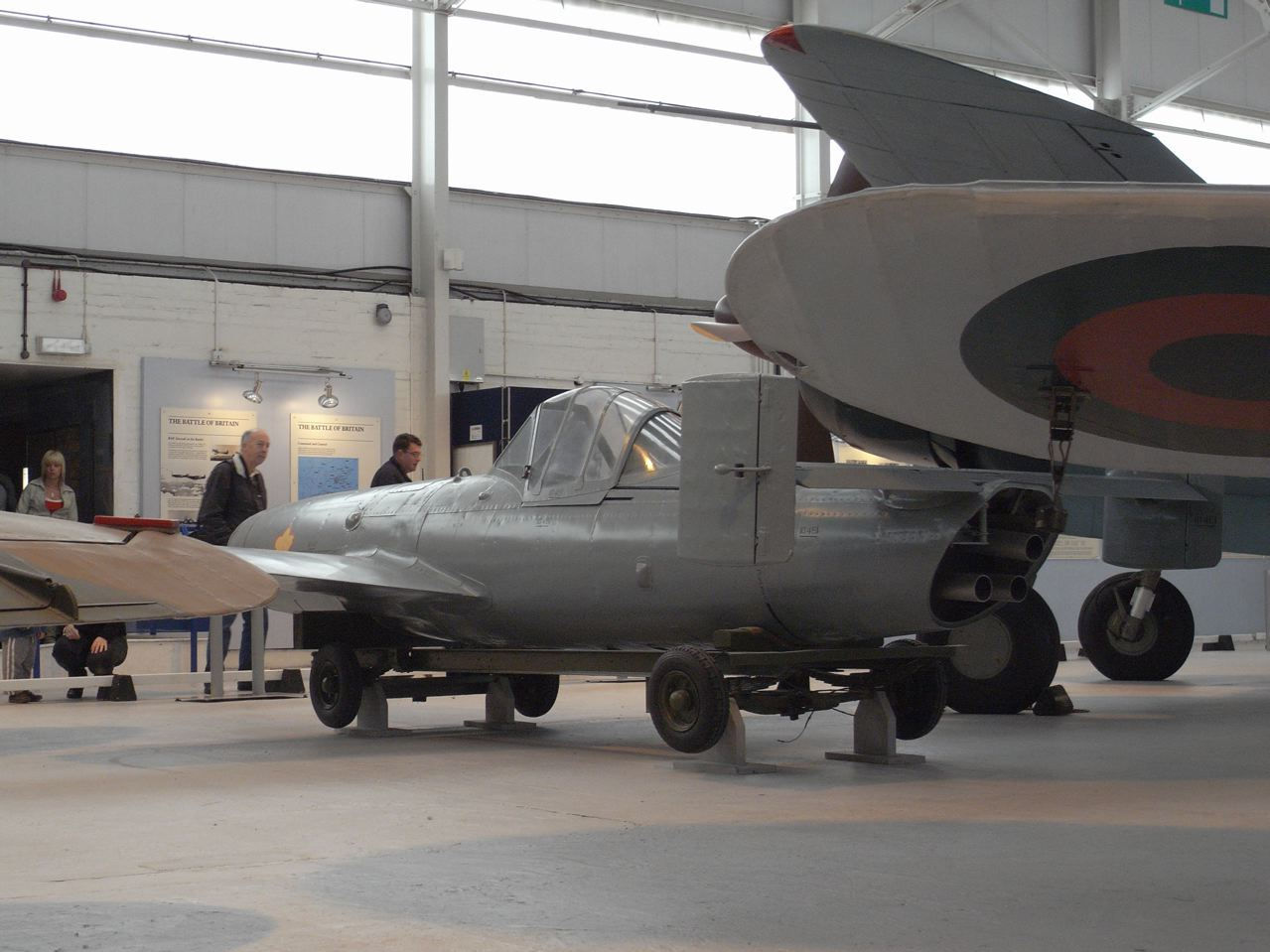
The rear of Ohka, Royal Air Force Museum Cosford

Yokosuka Ohka Model 22

=== India ===
On display

- Model 11 on static display at the Indian Air Force Museum in Palam, New Delhi.

=== Japan ===
On display

- Model 11 on static display at Iruma Air Force Base in Iruma, Saitama.
- On static display at the Kawaguchiko Motor Museum in Narusawa, Yamanashi.

=== United Kingdom ===
On display

- Model 11 on static display at the Fleet Air Arm Museum in Yeovilton, Somerset.
- Model 11 on static display at the Imperial War Museum in London.
- Model 11 on static display at the Royal Air Force Museum London in London.
- Model 11 on static display at the Science and Industry Museum in Manchester.

=== United States ===
On display

- Model 11 on static display at the National Museum of the Marine Corps in Triangle, Virginia.
- Model 11 on static display at the Planes of Fame Air Museum in Chino, California.
- Model 11 on static display at the Yanks Air Museum in Chino, California.
- Model 22 in storage at the Steven F. Udvar-Hazy Center of the National Air and Space Museum in Chantilly, Virginia, the only surviving Model 22.
- Model 43B K-1 Kai Wakazakura on static display at the Pima Air & Space Museum in Tucson, Arizona. It is on loan from the National Air and Space Museum.
- K-1 on static display at the National Museum of the United States Air Force in Dayton, Ohio.
- K-1 on static display at the National Museum of the U.S. Navy in Washington, D.C.

== Replicas on display ==
=== Japan ===
- Model 11 on static display at the Yūshūkan of the Yasukuni Shrine in Tokyo.
- Model 11 on static display at Usashi Heiwa Museum in Usa, Oita.
- On static display in Ōka Park in Kashima, Ibaraki.
- Movie prop on static display in Kamisu Central Park in Kamisu, Ibaraki.

=== United States ===
- Model 11 on static display at the National Warplane Museum in Geneseo, New York.

=== Canada ===
- Model 11 on static display at the Jet Aircraft Museum in London, Ontario.

== Specifications (Ohka 11) ==
Data from Japanese Aircraft of the Pacific War

General characteristics

- Crew: 1
- Length: 6.066 m (19 ft 11 in)
- Wingspan: 5.12 m (16 ft 10 in)
- Height: 1.16 m (3 ft 10 in)
- Wing area: 6 m^{2} (65 sq ft)
- Empty weight: 440 kg (970 lb)
- Gross weight: 2,140 kg (4,718 lb)
- Powerplant: 3 × Type 4 Mark 1 Model 20 solid-propellant rocket motors, 2.62 kN (588 lbf) thrust each

Performance

- Maximum speed: 648 km/h (403 mph, 350 kn) at 3,500 m (11,500 ft)
- Never exceed speed: 926 km/h (575 mph, 500 kn) terminal dive velocity
- Range: 37 km (23 mi, 20 nmi)
- Wing loading: 356.7 kg/m^{2} (73.1 lb/sq ft)
- Thrust/weight: 0.38

Armament
1,200 kg (2,600 lb) Ammonal warhead

== See also ==
- Japanese Special Attack Units
- Flying bomb
- Fritz X
- Mitsubishi Ki-147
- The Cockpit, an anthology of short films containing one about an Ohka pilot

Aircraft of comparable role, configuration, and era

- Bachem Ba 349 Natter
- Fieseler Fi 103R Reichenberg (piloted V-1 flying bomb)
- Messerschmitt Me 328

Related lists

- List of military aircraft of Japan
