= BMW 003 =

Early German axial turbojet engine

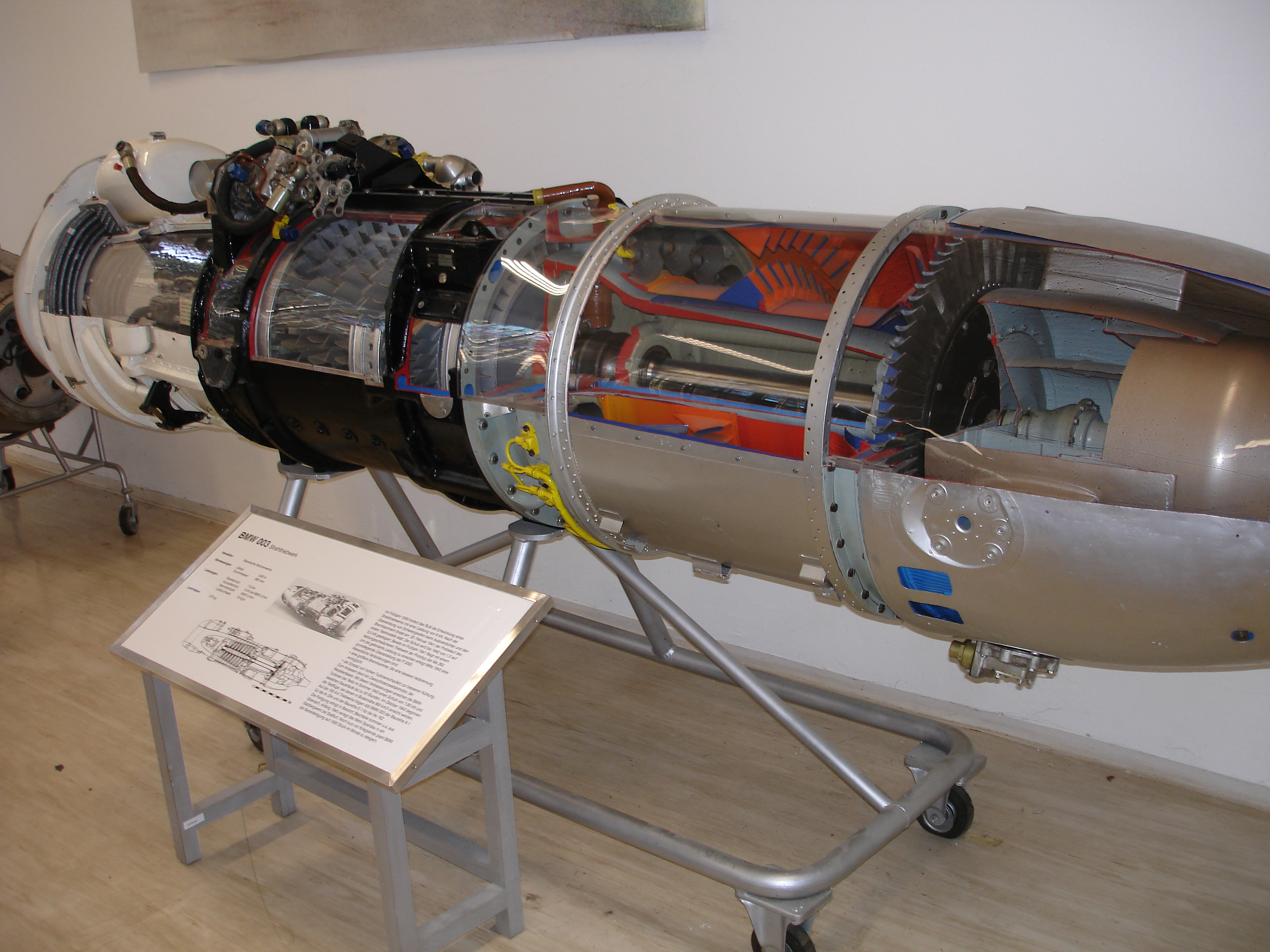
- BMW 003 engine at the Luftwaffenmuseum der Bundeswehr. Airflow from L to R.
- Type: Turbojet
- National origin: Germany
- Manufacturer: BMW
- First run: August 1940
- Major applications: Heinkel He 162
- Number built: 3,500
- Developed into: BMW 018; BMW GT 101; SNECMA Atar

The BMW 003 (full RLM designation 109-003) is an early axial turbojet engine produced by BMW AG in Germany during World War II. The 003 and the Junkers Jumo 004 were the only German turbojet engines to reach production during World War II.

Work had begun on the design of the BMW 003 before its contemporary, the Jumo 004, but prolonged developmental problems meant that the BMW 003 entered production much later, and the aircraft projects that had been designed with it in mind were re-engined with the Jumo powerplant instead. The most famous case of this was the Messerschmitt Me 262, which used the 003 in two of the V-series prototypes and in the two experimental A-1b aircraft. The only production aircraft to use the BMW 003 were the Heinkel He 162 and the later C-series, four-engined versions of the Arado Ar 234.

About 3,500 BMW 003 engines were built in Germany, but very few were ever installed in aircraft. The engine also formed the basis for turbojet development in Japan during the war, and in the Soviet Union following the war. A larger derivative was the BMW 018, but only three prototypes had been built by the end of the war.

== Design and development ==
The practicality of jet propulsion had been demonstrated in Germany in early 1937 by Hans von Ohain working with the Heinkel company. Recognising the potential of the invention, the Reich Air Ministry (German: Reichsluftfahrtministerium, abbreviated RLM) encouraged Germany's aero engine manufacturers to begin their own programmes of jet engine development, offering contracts to both Junkers and BMW for an engine capable of 1,520 lb (690 kg) static thrust.

The BMW 003 began development as a project of the Brandenburgische Motorenwerke (Brandenburg Motor Works, known as "Bramo"), under the direction of Hermann Östrich and assigned the RLM designation 109-003 (using the RLM's "109-" prefix, common to all jet and rocket engine projects). Bramo was also developing another turbojet, the 109–002. In 1939, BMW bought out Bramo, and in the acquisition, obtained both engine projects. The 109-002 had a very sophisticated contra-rotating compressor design intended to eliminate torque, but was abandoned in favour of the simpler engine, which in the end proved to have enough development problems of its own.

Construction began late in the same year and the engine ran for the first time in August 1940, but produced only 330 lb (150 kg) thrust, just half what was desired. The first flight test took place in mid-1941, mounted underneath a Messerschmitt Bf 110 testbed airframe. Problems continued, however, so delaying the program that while the Me 262 V1 prototype airframe (the first aircraft intended to use the engine) was ready for flight-testing, there were no power plants available for it and it actually began flight tests with a supplementary, conventional Junkers Jumo 210 piston engine in the nose. It was not until November 1941 that the Me 262 V1 was flown with BMW engines, which both failed during the test. The prototype aircraft had to return to the airfield on the power of the piston engine, which was still fitted.

The general usage of the BMW powerplant was abandoned for the Me 262, except for two experimental examples of the plane known as the Me 262 A-1b. The few Messerschmitt Me 262 A-1b test examples built used the more developed version of the 003 jet, recording an official top speed of 500 mph (800 km/h). The Me 262A-1a production version used the competing Jumo 004, whose heavier weight required the wings to be swept back in order to move the center of gravity into the correct position. Work on the 003 continued anyway, and by late 1942 it had been made far more powerful and reliable. The improved engine was flight tested under a Junkers Ju 88 in October 1943 and was finally ready for mass production in August 1944. Completed engines earned a reputation for unreliability; the time between major overhauls (not technically a TBO) was about 50 hours. (The competing Jumo 004's was between thirty and fifty, and may have been as low as ten.) Through 1944 the 003's reliability improved, making it a suitable power plant for air frame designs competing for the Jägernotprogramm’s light fighter production contract. which was won by the Heinkel He 162 Spatz design.

Developments of the engine included the 003C, which raised thrust to 900 kg (2,000 lb) — in the same thrust class as the competing Jumo 004B, but some 136 kg (300 lb) lighter in weight; and the 003D, which raised it to nearly 1,100 kg (2,400 lb), which added one extra compressor stage beyond the seven of the earlier designs, and an extra turbine stage, with the thrust-weight ratio of 16.58 N/kg for the 003D at only 1,431 lb (649 kg) in weight, being some 30% greater than the 1.288 lb_{f}/lb (12.63 N/kg) figure for the 950-kilogram (2,090 lb) Heinkel HeS 011A.

Only two German production aircraft used the 003. The first was the Heinkel He 162A Spatz (since the Volksjäger light fighter design competition mandated its use), with the Spatz utilizing an 003E version, designed to possess ventral mounting points to allow it to be mounted atop the fuselage of an aircraft. The other was the four-engined Arado Ar 234C reconnaissance-bomber variants, which were designed to use what was supposed to be the "more available" engine, despite its primary allocation for the He 162A.

The BMW 003 proved cheaper in materials than the company's own 801 radial, 12,000 ℛ︁ℳ︁ to 40,000 ℛ︁ℳ︁, and cheaper than the Junkers Jumo 213 inverted V12 piston engine at 35,000 ℛ︁ℳ︁, but slightly more costly than the competing Junkers Jumo 004's 10,000 ℛ︁ℳ︁. Moreover, the 004 needed only 375 hours to complete (including manufacture, assembly, and shipping), compared to 1,400 for the 801. At Kolbermoor, location of the Heinkel-Hirth engine works, the Fedden Mission, led by Sir Roy Fedden, found jet-engine manufacturing was simpler and required lower-skill labor and less sophisticated tooling than piston engine production; in fact, most of making of hollow turbine blades and sheet metal work on jets could be done by tooling used in making automobile body panels. The lifetime of the combustion chambers was estimated at 200 hours.

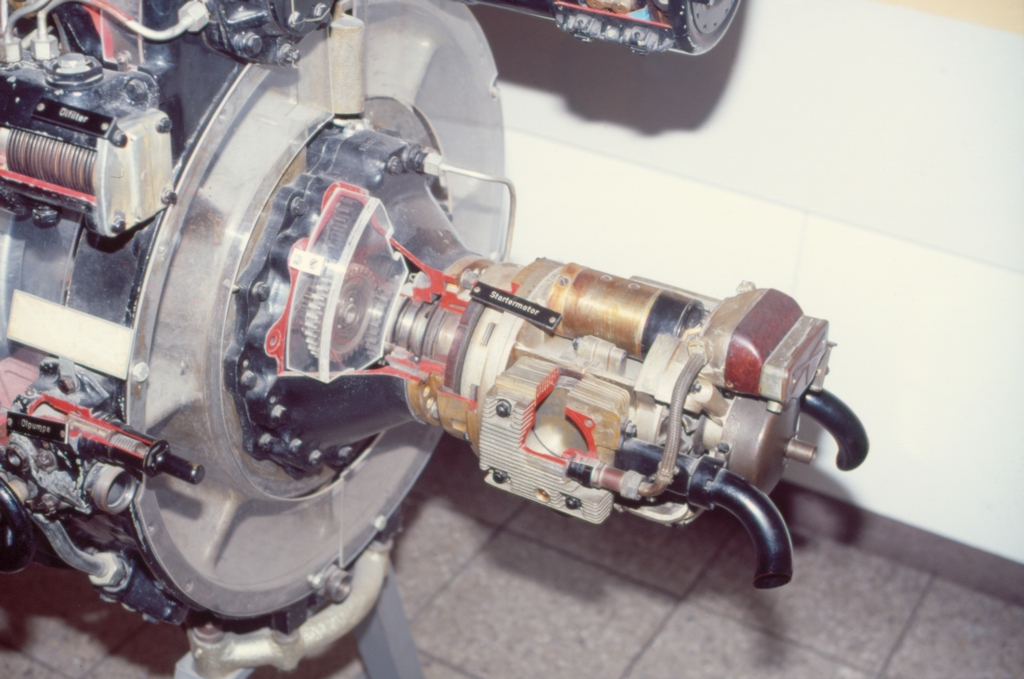
Preserved BMW 003 with Riedel flat-twin mechanical APU fitted

The BMW 003 utilized nearly the same starting method as its slightly more powerful Jumo 004 competitor: one of Norbert Riedel's 10 PS flat-twin two-stroke engines, installed within the engine's intake diverter as a mechanical APU, to get the 003's central shaft rotating for operation. An American military-authored post-war review of the BMW 003 stated that an electric starter of some sort was used to "turn over" the Riedel APU, with no existing photos of either wartime or restored BMW 003s showing the "D-shape" pull handle so prominent on the noses of many museum-preserved Jumo 004's intake diverters.

=== "Mixed-power" upgrade ===
One late version of the engine added a small rocket motor (the BMW 109-718) at the rear and usually just above the exhaust of the engine, which added some 1,250 kg (2,760 lb) thrust each for three to five minutes, for take off and short dashes. In this configuration, it was known as the BMW 003R and was tested, albeit with some serious reliability problems, on single prototypes for advanced models of the Me 262 (the Me 262C-2b Heimatschützer II [Home Defender II]), and He 162 (He 162E). Both prototypes flew under hybrid jet/rocket power during March 1945, though records do not indicate the results of testing with the 162E.

Only about 500 examples of the BMW 003 were built, but the Fedden Mission postwar estimated total German jet engine production by mid-1946 could have reached 100,000 units a year, or more.

The 003 was intended for export to Japan, but working examples of the engine were never supplied. Instead, Japanese engineers used cross-section drawings to design an indigenous turbojet, the Ishikawajima Ne-20.

=== Turboshaft development ===
The 003 was selected as the basis for a gas turbine development project for the German military's anticipated need for what is today called a turboshaft powerplant for multiple needs — this project was called the GT 101, using the 003 axial-flow turbojet as the starting point in mid-November 1944. Its original purpose would have been to re-engine the Panther tank with a turboshaft-based power system capable of up to a 1,150 PS usable shaft horsepower rating into an AFV's drivetrain, from an engine weight of only 990 lb (450 kg), giving it a 27 hp/ton power-to-weight ratio — just over twice the factor that the Panther's original gasoline-fueled Maybach V12 piston engine provided.

=== Post-war use ===
Following the war, two captured 003s powered the prototype of the first Soviet jet, the Mikoyan-Gurevich MiG-9. Blueprints for BMW engines had been seized by Soviet forces from both the Basdorf-Zühlsdorf plant near Berlin and the notorious Mittelwerk slave labor facility near Nordhausen. Production of the 003 was set up at the "Red October" GAZ 466 (Gorkovsky Avtomobilny Zavod, or Gorky Automobile Plant) in Leningrad and in Kuznetsov along KMPO, where the engine was mass-produced from 1947 under the designation RD-20 (reactivnyi dvigatel, or "jet drive").

After the Allied occupation of Germany, Marcel Dassault assisted Hermann Östrich in moving from the American Zone of occupied Germany into the French Zone. Within a couple of years, he was working for Voisin, a division of SNECMA, France's state-owned aircraft engine company. Using the basic design of the 003, he produced the larger Atar jet engine that powered Dassault's Ouragan, Dassault Mirage III and Mystère fighters.

== Variants ==
Data from:Aircraft Engines of the world 1946 and Design Analysis of BMW 003 Turbojet by Maj Rudolph C Schulte, Project Officer, Turbojet and Gas Turbine Developments, HQ, USAAF

BMW 003A-1 (TL 109–003)
Prototype, 5.87 kN (1,320 lbf) / 8,000 rpm / sea level, weight of 609 kg (1,343 lb).
BMW 003A-2 (TL 109–003)
Initial production variant, 7.83 kN (1,760 lbf) / 9,500 rpm / sea level.
BMW 003C (TL 109–003)
Improved design, reduced weight A-2, 8.81 kN (1,980 lbf), (equal to Jumo 004B) / 9,500 rpm / sea level
BMW 003D (TL 109–003)
Improved design 003C, 10.76 kN (2,420 lbf) / 10,000 rpm / sea level, weight of 649 kg (1,431 lb) [301 kg (664 lb) lighter than the HeS 011], one extra compressor and turbine stage added for higher thrust, only lengthening the engine by 303 mm (11 15/16 in) overall compared to the A-2.
BMW 003E
With ventral mounting points for use atop the fuselage, on the Heinkel He 162 and Henschel Hs 132.
BMW 003R (TLR 109–003)
An 003A-2 subtype turbojet with a BMW 109-718 (RLM powerplant number 109-718) liquid-fuel rocket fixed permanently above the jet exhaust nozzle, running on a hypergolic combination of R-stoff (a.k.a. Tonka or TONKA-250, 50% triethylamine and 50% xylidine) for fuel and SV-Stoff (aka RFNA propellants: 94% HNO_{3}, 6% N_{2}O_{4}) oxidizer, code-named Salbei (sage). The 003R delivered a combined thrust of 20.06 kN (4,510 lbf) for 3 minutes.

== Applications ==
- Arado Ar 234V6, V8 prototypes and Ar 234C (four engines used)
- Heinkel He 162 (single jet engine)
- Junkers Ju 287 (two engines used for Ju 287 V2, six engines used for V3 and Ju 287A-1)
- Messerschmitt Me 262 (A-1b test version, and Heimatschützer II experimental twin-BMW 003R powered interceptor only - all twin-engined)

== Specifications (BMW 003A-2) ==
Data from Aircraft Engines of the world 1946

==== General characteristics ====
- Type: axial flow turbojet
- Length: 360 cm (143 in)
- Diameter: 69 cm (27.2 in)
- Dry weight: 623.7 kg (1,375 lb)

==== Components ====
- Compressor: 7-stage axial
- Combustors: 1 annular
- Turbine: single-stage axial
- Fuel type: J-2 diesel fuel or gasoline
- Oil system: Pressure feed at 586 kPa (85 psi), dry sump with 4 scavenge pumps with annular tank and cooler, using oil grade 163 S.U. secs (35 cSt) (D.T.D 44D) at 38 °C (100 °F)

==== Performance ====
- Maximum thrust: 7.8 kN (1,760 lbf) at 9,500 rpm at sea level for takeoff
- Overall pressure ratio: 3.1:1
- Air mass flow: 19.3 kg/s (42.5 lb/s) at 9,500 rpm
- Turbine inlet temperature: 770 °C (1,418 °F)
- Specific fuel consumption: 40 g/(kN⋅s) (1.4 lb/(lbf⋅h))
- Thrust-to-weight ratio: 1.13
- Normal, static: 6.89 kN (1,550 lbf) / 9,000 rpm / sea level
- Military flight: 6.23 kN (1,400 lbf) / 9,500 rpm / 2,500 m (8,202 ft) / 900 km/h (559 mph; 486 kn)
- Normal, flight: 2.85 kN (640 lbf) / 11,500 rpm / 11,000 m (36,089 ft) / 900 km/h (559 mph; 486 kn)

== See also ==
Related development

- BMW 018
- BMW GT 101
- Snecma Atar

Comparable engines

- Junkers Jumo 004
- Ishikawajima Ne-20
- Heinkel HeS 30
- Metrovick F.2
- Westinghouse J30

Related lists

- List of aircraft engines

== Bibliography ==
- Wilkinson, Paul H. (1946). Aircraft Engines of the world 1946. London: Sir Isaac Pitman & Sons. pp. 300–301.
- Dyer, Edwin M (2009). Japanese Secret Projects, Experimental Aircraft of the IJA and IJN 1939-1945. Midland Publishing, 2009, ISBN 9781857803174
- Gunston, Bill. World Encyclopedia of Aero Engines. Cambridge, England. Patrick Stephens Limited, 1989. ISBN 1-85260-163-9
- Jane's Fighting Aircraft of World War II. London. Studio Editions Ltd, 1989. ISBN 0-517-67964-7
- Kay, Antony, German Jet Engine and Gas Turbine Development 1930–1945, Airlife Publishing, 2002, ISBN 9781840372946
