= Turbojet development at the RAE =

Between 1936 and 1940 Alan Arnold Griffith designed a series of turbine engines that were built under the direction of Hayne Constant at the Royal Aircraft Establishment (RAE). The designs were advanced for the era, typically featuring a "two-spool" layout with high- and low-pressure compressors that individually had more stages than typical engines of the era. Although advanced, the engines were also difficult to build, and only the much simpler "Freda" design would ever see production, as the Metrovick F.2 and later the Armstrong Siddeley Sapphire. Much of the pioneering work would be later used in Rolls-Royce designs, starting with the hugely successful Rolls-Royce Avon.

== Early work ==
In 1920 W.J. Stern of the Air Ministry Laboratory in South Kensington wrote a report in response to an Aeronautical Research Committee (ARC) request about the possibilities of developing a gas turbine engine to drive a propeller. His report was extremely negative. Given the performance of existing turbocompressors, such an engine appeared to be mechanically inefficient. In addition to high weight and poor fuel efficiency, Stern was skeptical that there were materials available that would be suitable for use in the high-heat areas of the turbine.

Griffith, who was at this point the senior scientific officer at the RAE at Farnborough, read Stern's report and responded with a request that the National Physical Laboratory should study the materials problem. Griffiths, meanwhile, started studying the issues with compressor design. In 1926 he published An Aerodynamic Theory of Turbine Design, which noted that existing compressor designs used flat blades that were essentially "flying stalled" and that efficiency could be dramatically improved by shaping them aerodynamically.

In October, Griffith presented the paper to a small group from the Air Ministry and the RAE. They unanimously supported starting a development project to study Griffiths' compressor designs. Initial work started in 1927, and by 1929 this project had progressed to the point of building an extremely simple 4-inch-diameter (100 mm) "engine" consisting of a single-stage compressor and turbine with a single row of stators in front of each. Designed solely to test the basic concept, the rig nevertheless demonstrated superb aerodynamic efficiencies as high as 91%.

At the same the RAE team introduced the "cascade", consisting of multiple rows of compressor blades attached to flat plates. Unconvinced that the aerodynamics of a single blade in a wind tunnel would match the real world performance of a multi-stage compressor, the cascade allowed various compressor layouts to be tested simply by moving the plates on a mounting plate inside the wind tunnel. This also allowed the angle of attack to be easily varied by rotating the plates with respect to the airflow. According to NASA, one of the reasons UK engine design remained ahead of the US into the 1950s was that the cascade tests and theory were widely used in the UK, while generally ignored in the US.

== CR.1 ==
During this period Griffith was promoted to principal scientific officer at the Air Ministry's South Kensington Laboratory. Here he returned to theoretical work and published a report in November 1929 that outlined the design and theoretical performance of a 500 hp turbine engine driving a propeller. Contrary to Stern's earlier report, Griffith demonstrated that if the existing testbed design could be scaled up successfully, it would have performance far superior to existing piston engines.

The engine outlined in the report was quite complex, consisting primarily of a fourteen-stage gas generator. In contrast to typical designs where the compressor and turbine are separate and connected on a shaft, in the CR.1 design there were a series of disks that each held a single compressor stage on the inner circumference and a turbine stage on the outer. Each was independently mounted to a non-rotating support shaft in the center, and could turn independently of the other stages. They were arranged to rotate in opposite directions.

Air was taken in at the rear of the engine, passed through the compressor stages in the center, entered a novel rotating combustion chamber than also reversed the direction of the airflow, and then exited the burners across the turbine stages at the outside. A separate turbine was used to power the propeller, or in later designs, a multi-stage fan.

In April 1930 Griffith proposed building a testbed version of his design, but the ARC concluded that it was simply too far beyond the current state of the art. In 1931 Griffith returned to the RAE. At some point during this period he was given Frank Whittle's engine design using centrifugal compressors and returned a negative response; after pointing out minor errors in the calculations he stated that the centrifugal design was inefficient and its large frontal size would make it unsuitable for aircraft use. He also stated that Whittle's idea of using the hot exhaust directly for thrust was inefficient and would not match the performance of existing engines, in spite of Whittle concentrating on high-speed use where it would be more effective (propellers suffer a dramatic drop in efficiency below the speed of sound (M.1)).

Sometime later, Armstrong Siddeley built a single example of this "contra-flow turbo-compressor", which was quite compact. However, air leaking between the compressor and turbine areas was a significant problem, as much as 50% of the air leaked between the seals, compared to a predicted 4%. Other issues included the large differences in temperatures along a single rotor due to the turbine and compressor being a single unit. The concept was not used for further developments.

== Anne and Betty ==
In 1936 ARC, now under the direction of Henry Tizard, returned to the turbine engine concept after learning that Whittle was going ahead with his designs at his new company, Power Jets. Tizard convinced Hayne Constant to return to the RAE from Imperial College to assist with the development of Griffith's designs. They set about building a 6-inch-diameter (150 mm) version of the inner portion of the Griffith engine, known as Anne, consisting of the hub and eight compressor stages without the outer turbine portions. On its first run a faulty seal allowed the oil to drain from the engine, and the blading was stripped off after only 30 seconds of running. In 1937, while Anne was being built, Griffith visited Jakob Ackeret of Brown Boveri, another turbine pioneer, and became convinced that the compressor/stator design was superior to his own contra-rotating "all compressor" concept. After it was damaged, Anne was rebuilt using the new layout and started running again in October 1939. It continued to be used in tests until it was destroyed in a German bombing raid by KG 54 on 13 August 1940, "Eagle Day".

At this point there was some debate as to how to proceed after Anne. The team, which included Griffith, Constant, Taffy Howell and D. Carter, studied a number of approaches to building a complete engine, as opposed to the compressor-only Anne. They decided that the only reasonable solution to low compressor efficiency was to use what would today be referred to as a "two-spool" design, with separate high and low-pressure compressors. However the team considered the concentric shafts needed for this layout to be too complex (although the reasons for this are not clear), and there was some consideration of using two completely separate compressor/turbine sections "side-by-side". Eventually they settled on building one of the two engines that would be used in such a layout, in order to study the mechanical problems.

The resulting Betty design consisted of a nine-stage compressor 1 1/2 feet in diameter attached through a coupling to a four-stage turbine. A considerable amount of design effort went into various devices to relieve mechanical stress due to thermal expansion. For instance, the compressor and turbine blading was attached to large hollow rotors which they felt would expand and contract more like the outer engine casing than a series of solid disks as used in Anne. The ends of the turbine rotor were closed with double-cones, which had enough flexibility to expand with the rotor while still remaining solidly attached to the power shaft.

The compressor and turbine were attached to each other through another rotor, allowing the two sections to be easily separated. When attached, they were arranged "inside out", with the compressor intake near the center of the engine and its outlet at one end. Here it entered two long tubes with the combustion chambers, piping the resulting hot air to the enter end of the engine where it entered the turbine. The turbine outlet was next to the compressor inlet. Finally the turbine was water-cooled, as it was believed that even the latest high-temperature alloys like Hadfield's ERA/ATV would eventually deform under constant operation.

Betty, also known as B.10, was first tested as separate compressor and turbine sections using steam to power them. In October 1940 they were run as a single complete engine for the first time. During testing it was decided that the water cooling was not needed, and was replaced by an air cooling system, and the turbine was allowed to run red hot at 675 C. Experiments with Betty convinced the team that any sort of piping between sections led to unacceptable losses, so the "distributed engine" concept Betty was built to test would likely be inefficient. At the same time, it was decided that overall pressure ratios on the order of 5:1 would be sufficient for near-term engines, so it was decided to abandon the two-spool approach for the time being.

== A dead-end ==
During construction, Constant produced a new report, The internal combustion turbine as a prime mover for aircraft, RAE Note E.3546. By this point several high-temperature alloys had become available with creep strength up to 700 °C, and Constant demonstrated that using these materials in an engine would produce what would now be called a turboprop that would outperform existing piston engines except at very low altitudes. Further, continued improvements in these metals would allow improvements in compression ratios that would lead to it being completely superior to piston engines in all ways. The report also pointed out that such an engine would be considerably less complex than a piston engine of similar power, and therefore more reliable.

Based on the work with Betty and Constant's report, ARC gave the team the go-ahead to build a complete turboprop engine. The new D.11 Doris design consisted of an enlarged Betty-like 17-stage compressor/ 8-stage turbine section, and a mechanically separate 5-stage low-pressure turbine to drive the propeller. Designed to provide about 2,000 hp, construction of Doris started in 1940.

By this point in time Whittle's centrifugal-compressor designs were fully operational, and plans were underway to start production of early models. The progress had been so swift that Whittle's argument that the centrifugal layout was mechanically superior than the axial designs appeared to be borne out. Adding to their problems, in June 1939 Griffith left the team and started work at Rolls-Royce. At Rolls he returned to his earlier "contraflow" designs and eventually produced such a design in 1944, but the concept was abandoned as being too complex.

So even while Doris was being built, Whittle's successes meant it was considered outdated, and work proceeded slowly. It was not until 1941 that the Doris compressor started running, and in testing it demonstrated a number of problems related to high-speed airflow that could not be tested in the earlier cascade wind tunnel system. A new high-speed version was constructed to test these issues, and new blading provided to address the problems were added later in 1941. The Doris concept was then abandoned.

== The F.2 ==
Before construction started on Doris the RAE team had already turned their attention to the problem of delivering a usable "pure-jet" engine as quickly as possible. The earlier designs had been built with the assumption that overall airflow should be kept as low as possible and that the energy would be extracted through a propeller. This was not appropriate for a pure-jet, where airflow is also providing the thrust. A new 9-stage compressor section known as Freda was designed, increasing in size to just over 22 inches in diameter and providing 50 lb/s airflow and a compression ratio of about 4:1.

Freda proved successful, and in December 1939 was fitted with a turbine section to become the first self-running axial turbojet in England, the F.1, providing 2,150 lbf. Attention immediately turned to a slightly larger design, the F.1A of 2,690 lbf. There were a number of detail changes including the removal of water cooling for the turbine and various enlargements to increase the mass flow from the F.1's 38 lb/s to 47.5 lb/s, closer to the original Freda design concept.

As attention turned to a production design, Constant started organizing industrial partners with the manufacturing capability to set up serial production. In July 1940 Metropolitan-Vickers (Metrovick) joined the effort, as they were a major steam turbine manufacturer and would be ideally suited to rapid scale-up. The F.1A was turned over to Metrovick in July 1940, and a production effort started as the F.2.

== Further work ==
The RAE continued working on axial compressor design after the F.2 success. The original Freda compressor was later enlarged into Sarah with the addition of a further five low-pressure stages as part of a collaboration with Armstrong Siddeley, and eventually became the ASX. They also worked with the British General Electric Company on a series of axial compressor designs for other uses, and there was some exploration of axial-compressor based superchargers known as E.5. By this point, however, the British industrial companies had taken over much of the research and development effort, and the RAE team was no longer vital to continued development. It was later folded into the nationalized Power Jets to form the National Gas Turbine Establishment.

None of the RAE designs would go on to be a success on their own. The F.2 design was not put into production, although an enlarged version was very successful as the Armstrong Siddeley Sapphire. Griffith's complex designs at Rolls never worked properly and were abandoned, but he turned his attention to the simpler F.2-like AJ.65 design and produced the even more successful Rolls-Royce Avon, and later to the world's first turbofan, the Rolls-Royce Conway.

== Bibliography ==
- Kay, Antony, Turbojet, History and Development 1930-1960, Vol 1, Great Britain and Germany, pp. 12–20, Crowood Press, 2007. ISBN 978-1-86126-912-6
