= Greitzer =

Greitzer is a surname. Notable people with this surname include:

- Carol Greitzer (1925–2026), American politician
- Edward Greitzer, American physicist
- Samuel L. Greitzer (1905–1988), American mathematician
