= Metropolitan-Vickers F.2 =

Early turbojet engine

F.2/Beryl
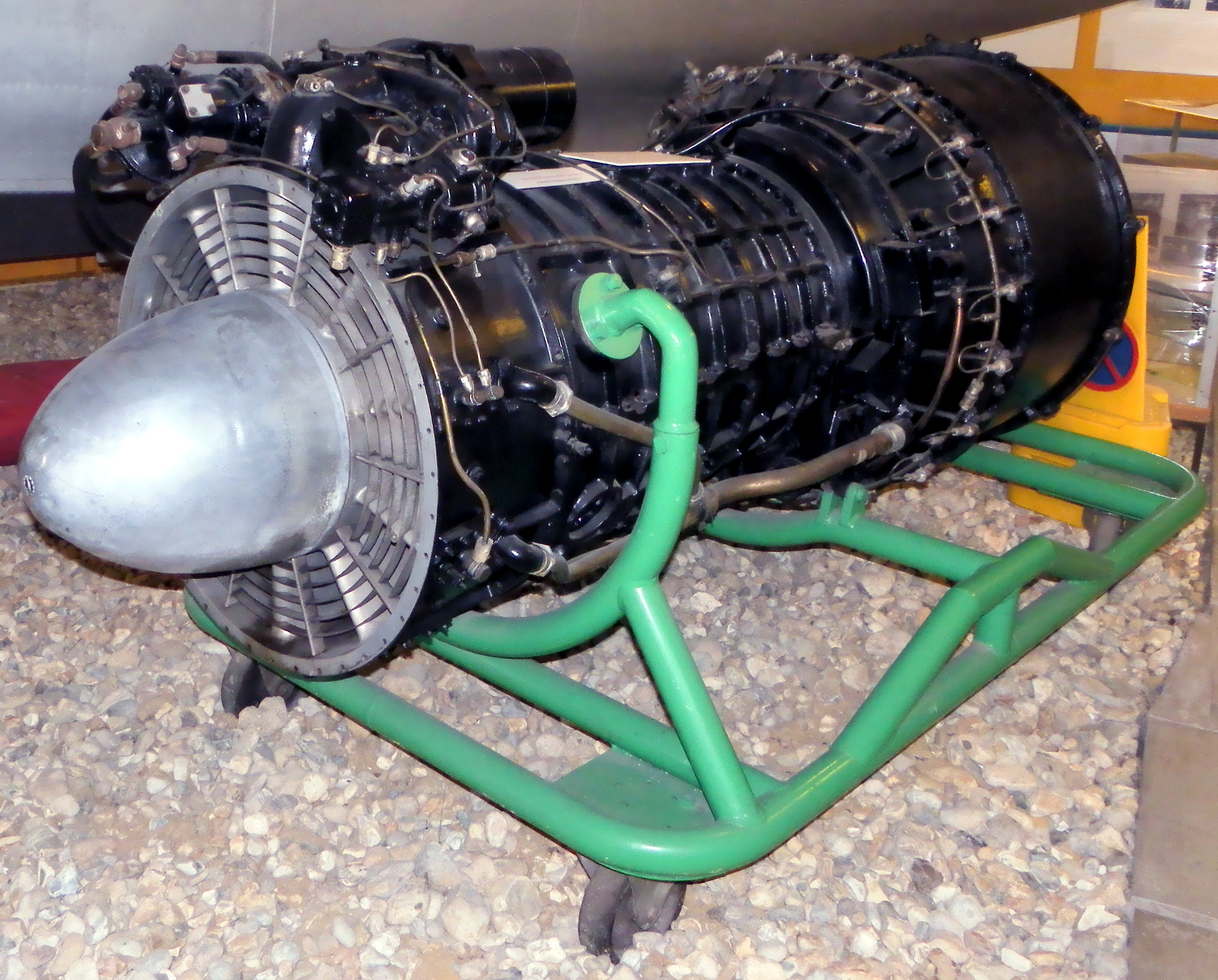
- Beryl engine preserved at Solent Sky Museum
- Type: Turbojet
- Manufacturer: Metropolitan-Vickers
- First run: 1941
- Major applications: Saunders-Roe SR.A/1

The Metropolitan-Vickers F.2 is an early turbojet engine and the first British design to be based on an axial-flow compressor. It was an extremely advanced design for the era, using a nine-stage axial compressor, annular combustor, and a two-stage turbine.

It first powered a Gloster Meteor in November 1943, outperforming contemporary models from Power Jets. Despite this excellent start, it was considered unreliable and did not see use during the war. In the post-war era, newer engine designs provided much higher performance, and interest in the F.2 waned.

The potential of the engine and the investment did not go to waste, however; the design was passed from Metropolitan-Vickers (Metrovick) to Armstrong Siddeley when Metrovick left the gas turbine business. Armstrong Siddeley produced a larger version as the successful Sapphire.

== Development ==
Alan Arnold Griffith published a seminal paper in 1926, An Aerodynamic Theory of Turbine Design, that for the first time clearly demonstrated that a gas turbine could be used as a practical, and even desirable, aircraft powerplant. The paper started by demonstrating that existing axial compressor designs were "flying stalled" due to their use of flat blades, and dramatic improvements could be made by using aerofoil designs instead. It went on to outline a complete compressor and turbine design, using the extra exhaust power to drive a second turbine that would power a propeller. In today's terminology, the design was a turboprop.

In order to prove the design, Griffith and several other engineers at the Royal Aircraft Establishment built a testbed example of the compressor in 1928 known as Anne, the machinery being built for them by Fraser and Chalmers. After Anne's successful testing they planned to follow this up with a complete engine known as Betty, or B.10. As Betty was designed for test purposes, it was designed to allow the compressor and turbine sections to be run separately. To do this, the exhaust from the compressor was at the "front" of the engine, where it was piped through the combustion section to the "end" of the engine where it entered the turbine. This also meant the driveshaft between the sections was very short.

In 1929 Frank Whittle's thesis on pure jet engines was published, and after speaking to his commanding officer Whittle was taken by the Air Ministry to see Griffith. Griffith was critical of Whittle's work, identifying an error in Whittle's calculations, noting that the centrifugal compressor Whittle used would be impractical for aircraft use due to its large frontal area, and that the use of the jet exhaust directly for power would be extremely inefficient at the temperatures given. Whittle was distraught but was convinced that he should patent the idea anyway. Five years later a group of investors persuaded him to start work on what would be the first working British jet engine.

Griffith continued development of his own concepts, eventually developing an advanced compressor design using two contra-rotating stages that improved efficiency. His partner, Hayne Constant, started discussions in 1937 with Manchester-based Metrovick, a maker of steam turbines, to produce the new machinery. By 1939 this work had developed several improved versions of the Betty compressor design, which were incorporated into the new Freda. Incidentally, Metrovick had recently merged with British Thomson-Houston, another turbine builder who were supporting Whittle's efforts.

In April 1939, Whittle gave a startling demonstration of his experimental engine, the WU, running it for 20 minutes at high power. This led to a rash of contracts to build a production quality design suitable for aircraft use. Metrovick's head of design, David Smith, decided to end development of the turboprop concepts and focus on pure-jets instead. Development had just started when Whittle started building his W.1 design, planning to install one for flight in the Gloster E.28/39 the next year.

=== F.1 ===
In July 1940 the RAE signed a contract with Metrovick to build a flight-quality pure-turbojet engine based on the Freda turbine. This emerged as the F.1 concept, which was built in several forms, with the first running engine starting on the testbed in late 1941. The design cleared its special-category flight-tests in 1942, and flew for the first time on 29 June 1943 in the open bomb bay of an Avro Lancaster. Compared to the centrifugal-flow Whittle designs, the F.1 was extremely advanced, using a nine-stage axial compressor, annular combustion chamber, and a two-stage turbine.

=== F.2 ===
Development of the F.2 turbojet progressed rapidly, and the engine ran for the first time in November 1941. By that time, there were a number of engines in development based on the Whittle concept, but the F.2 looked considerably more capable than any of them. A flyable version, the F.2/1, received its test rating in 1942. One was fitted to an Avro Lancaster test-bed (the first prototype Lancaster, s/n BT308), mounted at the rear in place of the rear turret, with a single air intake on the top of the fuselage, in front of the twin tail plane. The aircraft first flew on 29 June 1943. Production quality versions of the F.2 were tested on the F.9/40M (Gloster Meteor) s/n DG204/G, which made its first flight on 13 November 1943. They were installed in underslung nacelles, in a manner similar to the engines of the Messerschmitt Me 262.

As expected, the F.2 engines were more powerful than the Whittle design, first delivering 1,800 lbf (8,000 N), but soon scaling up to well over 2,000 lbf (8,900 N). Around that time, the Whittle W.2B was developing only 1,600 lbf (7,100 N). However, there were doubts about the reliability of the F.2, mainly due to problems associated with hot spots building up on the turbine bearing and combustion chamber, which caused warping and fracturing of the turbine inlet nozzles. Around seven weeks after its first flight, on 4 January 1944, DG204/G was flying high speed tests at 20,000 feet over Farnborough. The aircraft's port F.2 engine suffered a rotor failure and disintegrated. The pilot, Squadron Leader William Davie, was killed while attempting to bail out.

The axial compressor of the F.2 was later offered to Rolls-Royce and used as the initial stage of the Rolls-Royce Clyde.

=== F.2/2 ===
To address these problems, in August 1942 a minor redesign delivered the F.2/2, which changed the turbine material from Rex 75 to Nimonic 75, and lengthened the combustion chamber by 6 inches (150 mm). Thrust was improved to 2,400 lbf (11,000 N) static, but the problems with overheating remained.

=== F.2/3 ===
Another attempt to solve the overheating problems resulted in the more highly modified F.2/3 during 1943. This version replaced the original annular combustion chamber with can-type burners like those on the Whittle designs. This appears to have solved the problems, raising the thrust to 2,700 lbf (12,000 N) in the process. However, by this time it was decided to move on to a much more powerful version of the engine.

=== F.2/4 Beryl ===
Development of the F.2 continued on a version using a ten-stage compressor for additional airflow driven by a single stage turbine. The new F.2/4 - the Beryl - initially developed 3,250 lbf (14.5 kN) and was test flown in Avro Lancaster Mk.II s/n LL735 before being installed in the Saunders-Roe SR.A/1 flying boat fighter. Thrust had already improved to 3,850 lbf (17.1 kN) for the third prototype, and eventually settled at 4,000 lbf (18 kN).

In comparison, the contemporary Derwent 5 (an engine designed by Rover as an improvement on Whittle's work) developed over 3,600 lbf (16.0 kN) of thrust in its final form. Development of the SR.A/1 ended in 1947, ending development of the Beryl along with it. Nevertheless, later on a Beryl from the SR.A/1 prototype was removed and used by Donald Campbell for early runs in his famous 1955 Bluebird K7 hydroplane in which he set seven water speed records between 1955 and 1964.

=== F.3 ===
In 1942 MV started work on thrust augmentation. The resulting Metropolitan-Vickers F.3 was the first British turbofan engine to be designed, built and tested. It could be said that the F.3 was also the first three-shaft jet engine to be built, although the configuration was completely different from that of the much later Rolls-Royce RB211 turbofan series, since the fan was located at the rear of the engine, not unlike that of the General Electric CJ805-23. Using a stock F.2/2, MV added a separate module to the rear of the engine (directly behind the HP turbine) which comprised contra-rotating LP turbines attached to two contra-rotating fans. Apart from the first stage nozzle guide vanes, the LP turbine was completely statorless, with four consecutive rotor stages. Rotors one and three drove the front fan clockwise (viewed from the front), whereas the rear fan was driven anticlockwise by rotors two and four. Although the front fan had inlet guide vanes, there were no vanes between the contra-rotating fan rotors or, downstream, any exit guide vanes. The core and bypass streams exhausted through separate coaxial propelling nozzles.

The project was generally successful, raising static thrust from around 2,400 to 4,000 lbf (11 to 18 kN) (4,600 lbf (20 kN) in 1947). Furthermore, specific fuel consumption fell from 1.05 to 0.65 lb/(lbf⋅h) (30 to 18 g/(kN⋅s)), which was the true aim of the project. The weight increase for all the extra turbomachinery and ducting was significant, however. A bonus was a marked decrease in noise levels which resulted from the slower, cold air from the fan mixing with the fast, hot exhaust from the gas generator.

Although the F.3 progressed nicely, development was curtailed by the pressures of war. When the war ended the F.2/2 was no longer current, so some of the ideas were applied to the more up-to-date F.2/4 to produce the Metropolitan-Vickers F.5 propfan.

=== F.5 ===
Following on where the F.3 left off, the F.5 was a version of the F.2/4 with an open rotor (unducted) thrust augmenter added to the end of the jet pipe, somewhat remote from the HP turbine The 5 ft 6 in diameter fixed pitch propellers, which contra-rotated, were driven by a four-stage statorless LP turbine unit, similar to that of the F.3. Static thrust increased from the 3,500lbf of the F.2/2 to in excess of 4,710 lbf (21,000 N), with a corresponding reduction in specific fuel consumption. Relative to the parent turbojet, the weight increase for this prop fan configuration was about 26%, compared to 53% for the F.3 turbofan. Development was cancelled when they sold their gas turbine business to Armstrong Siddeley in 1946.

=== F.9 Sapphire ===
Development of the F.2 ended in 1944. Development of the basic concept continued, however, eventually leading to the considerably larger F.9 Sapphire. However, in 1947, Metrovick left jet engine production and their design team moved to Armstrong Siddeley. The Sapphire matured into a successful design, initially besting the thrust of its Rolls-Royce contemporary, the Avon. Design features of the Metrovick line were worked into Armstrong Siddeley's own line of axial compressor turboprops, although Armstrong Siddeley dropped Metrovick's use of gemstone names for their engines in favour of continuing with animal names, in particular snakes.

An example of the prototype engine can be found in the Science Museum Flight Gallery in London.

== Engines on display ==
A Metrovick Beryl is on display at the Rolls-Royce Heritage Trust (Derby).

== Specifications (F.2/2) ==
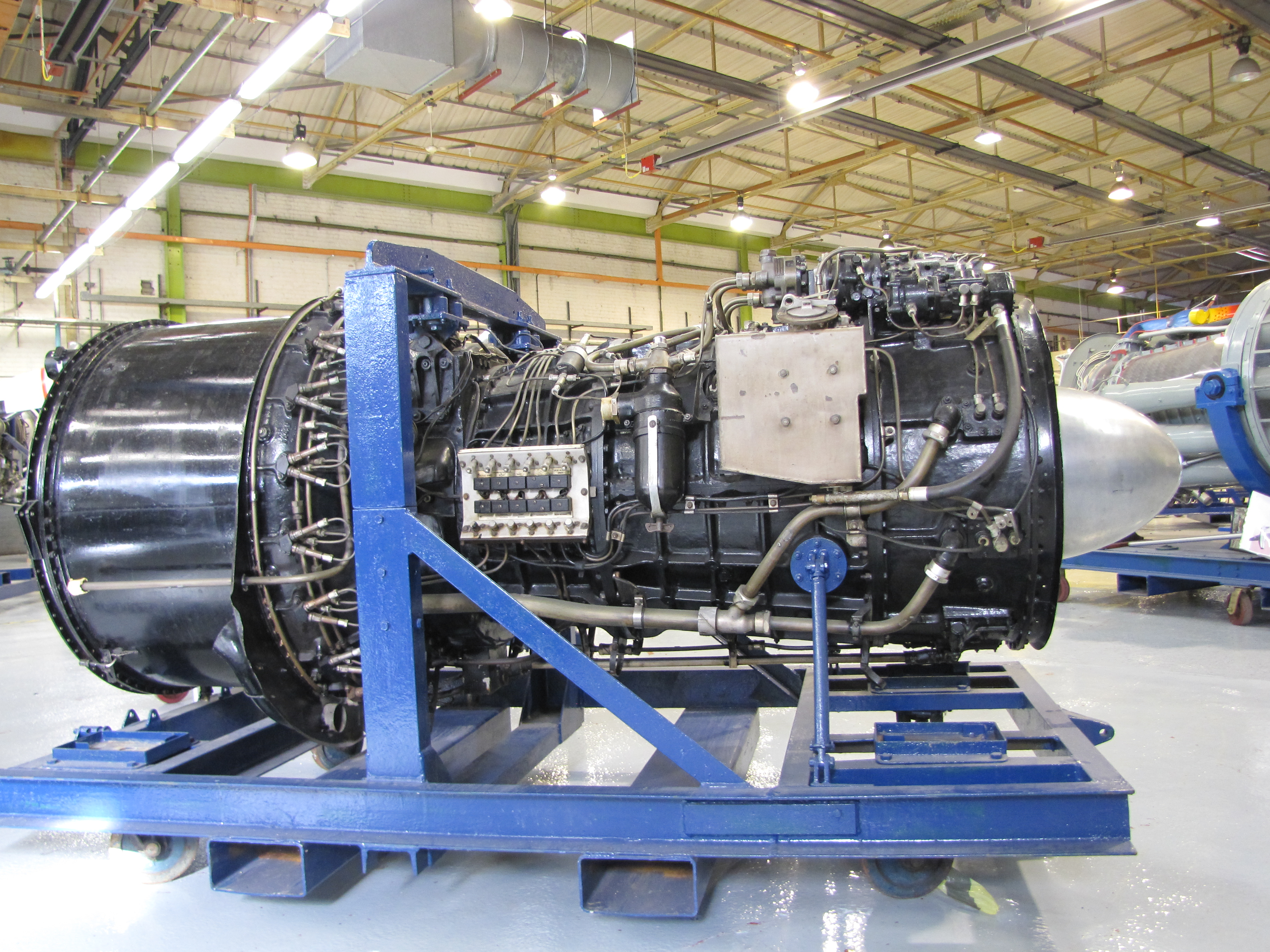
On display at the Rolls-Royce Heritage Trust (Derby)

Data from Wilkinson.

==== General characteristics ====
- Type: axial flow turbojet
- Length: 159 in (4,039 mm)
- Diameter: 34.9 in (886 mm)
- Dry weight: ~1,500 lb (680 kg)

==== Components ====
- Compressor: 9-stage axial flow compressor
- Combustors: one annular stainless steel combustion chamber
- Turbine: two stage axial flow turbine
- Fuel type: kerosene

==== Performance ====
- Maximum thrust: 2,400 lbf (11 kN) at sea level static, take-off
- Overall pressure ratio: 3.5:1
- Air mass flow: ~50.23lb/s (~22.78kg/s)
- Turbine inlet temperature: 1,382 °F (750 °C)
- Specific fuel consumption: 1.07 lb/(lbf⋅h) (30 g/(kN⋅s))
- Thrust-to-weight ratio: ~1.6

== See also ==
Comparable engines

- BMW 003
- General Electric J47

Related lists

- List of aircraft engines
