= Turbojet =

Airbreathing jet engine which is typically used in aircraft

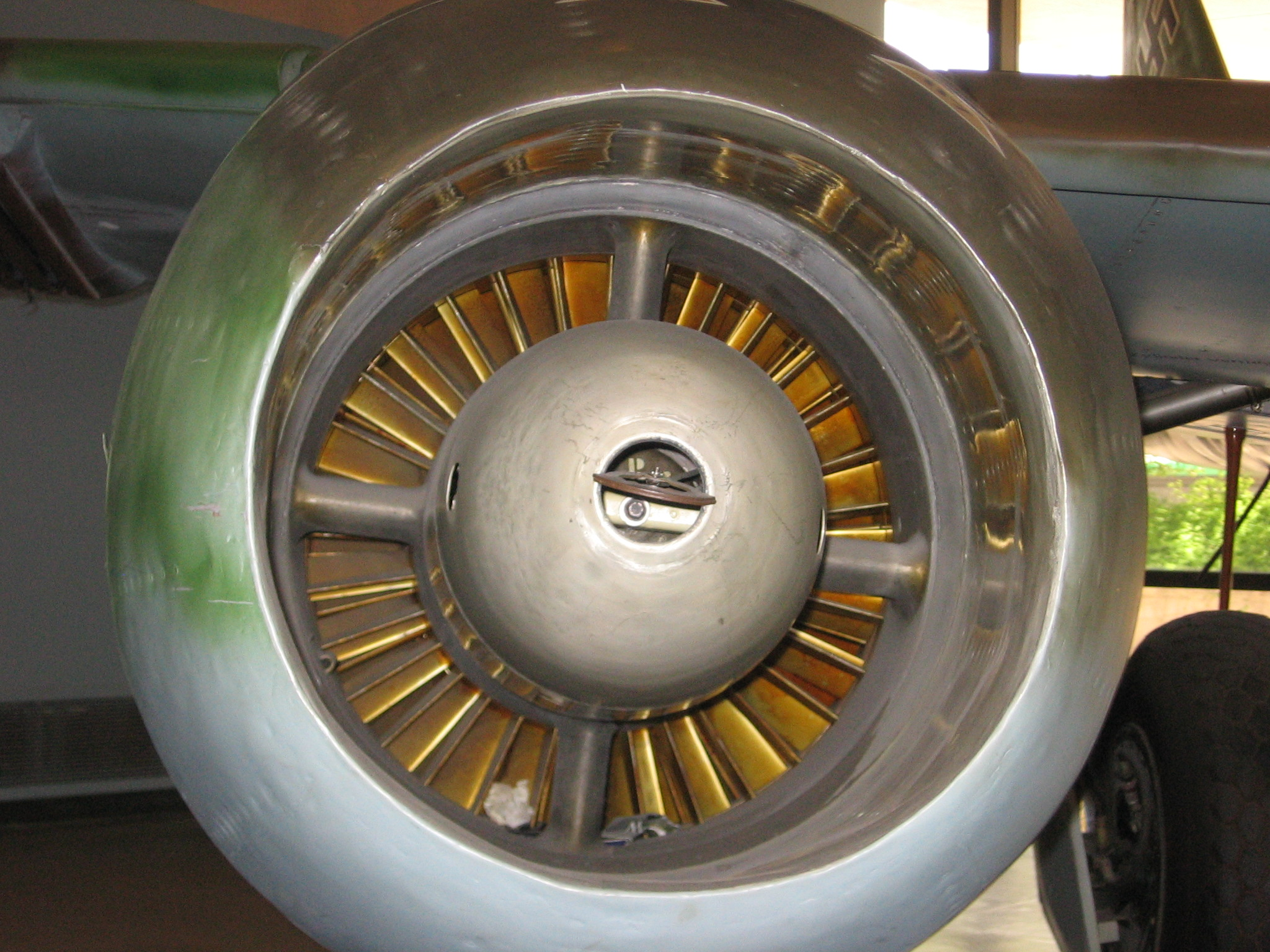
Junkers Jumo 004, the first production turbojet in operational use, showing the starter pull-start handle housed in the center of the intake nose bullet.

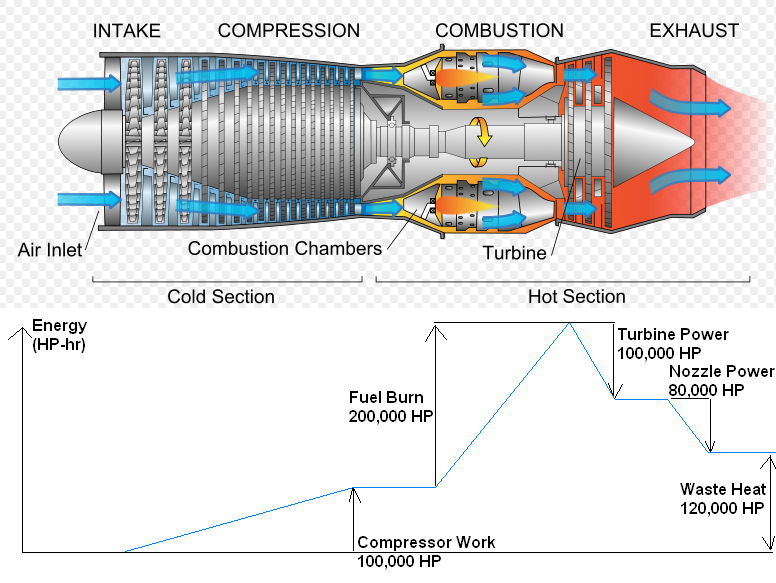
Diagram of a typical gas turbine jet engine

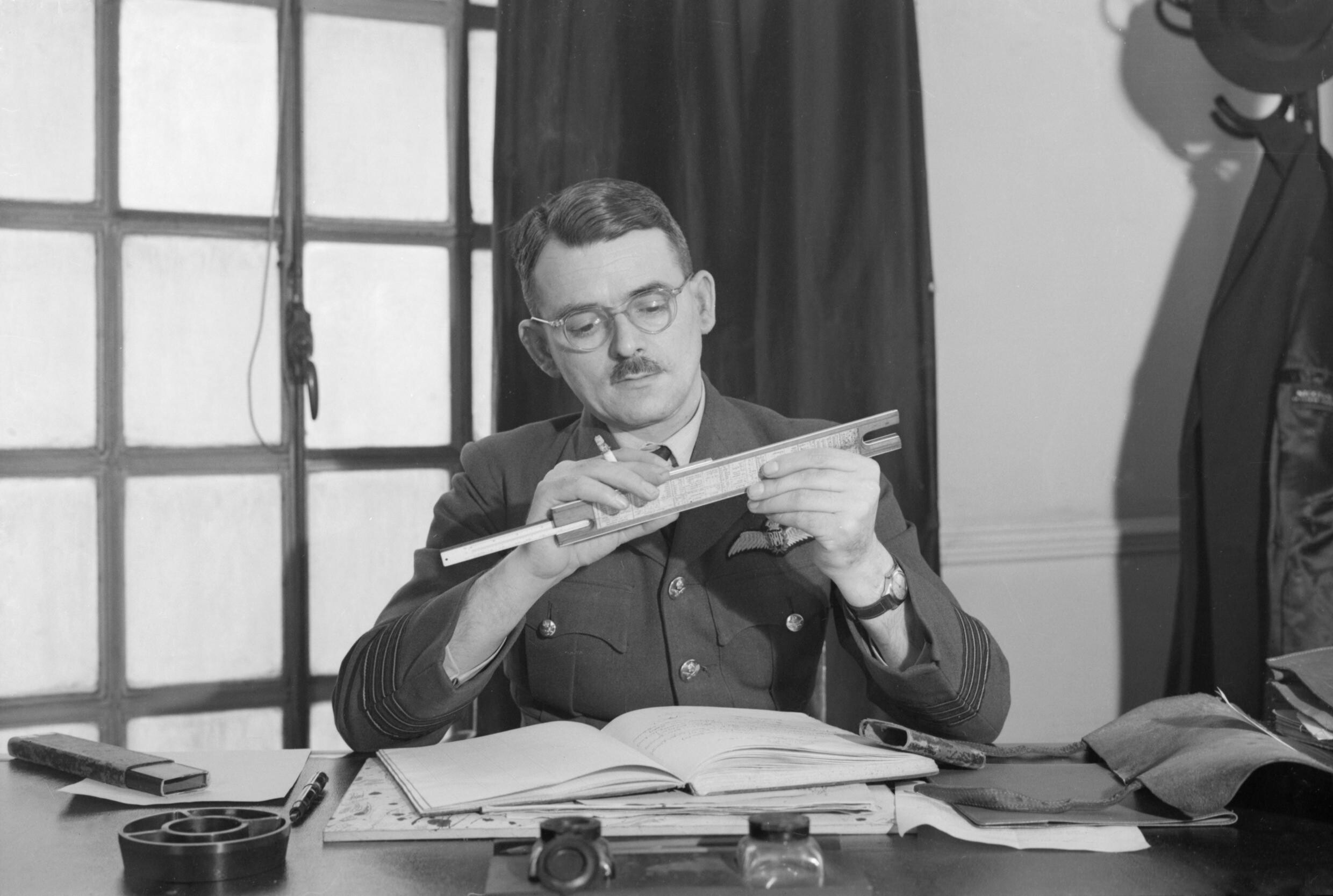
Frank Whittle

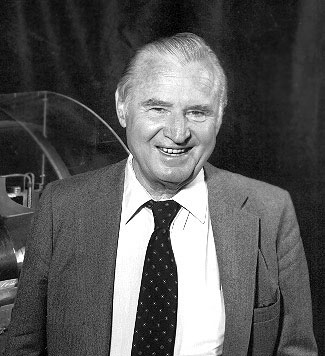
Hans von Ohain

The turbojet is an airbreathing jet engine which is typically used in aircraft. It consists of a gas turbine with a propelling nozzle. The gas turbine has an air inlet which includes inlet guide vanes, a compressor, a combustion chamber, and a turbine (that drives the compressor). The compressed air from the compressor is heated by burning fuel in the combustion chamber and then allowed to expand through the turbine. The turbine exhaust is then expanded in the propelling nozzle where it is accelerated to high speed to provide thrust. Two engineers, Frank Whittle in the United Kingdom and Hans von Ohain in Germany, developed the concept independently into practical engines during the late 1930s.

Turbojets have poor efficiency at low vehicle speeds, which limits their usefulness in vehicles other than aircraft. Turbojet engines have been used in isolated cases to power vehicles other than aircraft, typically for attempts on land speed records. Where vehicles are "turbine-powered", this is more commonly by use of a turboshaft engine, a development of the gas turbine engine where an additional turbine is used to drive a rotating output shaft. These are common in helicopters and hovercraft.

Turbojets were widely used for early supersonic fighters, up to and including many third generation fighters, with the MiG-25 being the latest turbojet-powered fighter developed. As most fighters spend little time traveling supersonically, fourth-generation fighters (as well as some late third-generation fighters like the F-111 and Hawker Siddeley Harrier) and subsequent designs are powered by the more efficient low-bypass turbofans and use afterburners to raise exhaust speed for bursts of supersonic travel. Turbojets were used on the Concorde and the longer-range versions of the Tu-144 which were required to spend a long period travelling supersonically. Turbojets are still common in medium range cruise missiles, due to their high exhaust speed, small frontal surface area, and relative simplicity.

== History ==
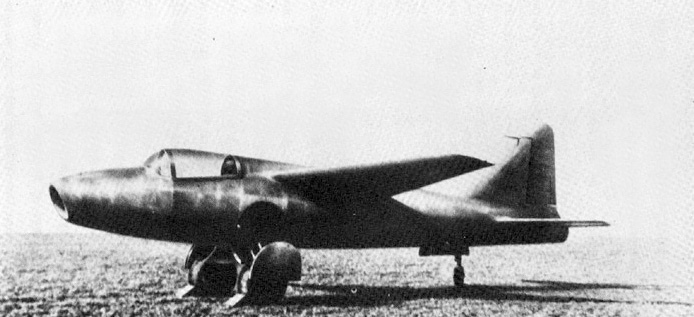
Heinkel He 178, the world's first aircraft to fly purely on turbojet power, using an HeS 3 engine

The first patent for using a gas turbine to power an aircraft was filed in 1921 by Frenchman Maxime Guillaume. His engine was to be an axial-flow turbojet, but was never constructed, as it would have required considerable advances over the state of the art in compressors.

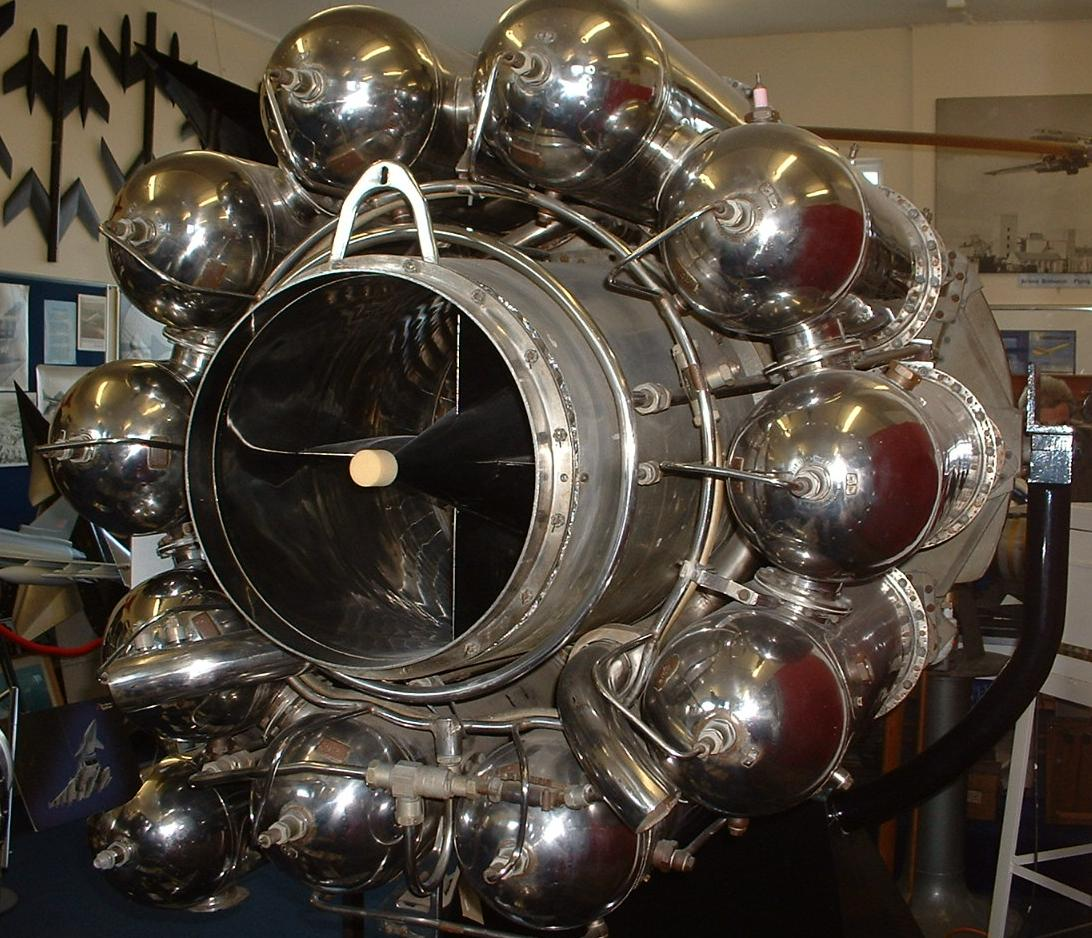
The Whittle W.2/700 engine flew in the Gloster E.28/39, the first British aircraft to fly with a turbojet engine, and the Gloster Meteor

In 1928, British RAF College Cranwell cadet Frank Whittle formally submitted his ideas for a turbojet to his superiors. In October 1929 he developed his ideas further. On 16 January 1930 in England, Whittle submitted his first patent (granted in 1932). The patent showed a two-stage axial compressor feeding a single-sided centrifugal compressor. Practical axial compressors were made possible by ideas from A.A. Griffith in a seminal paper in 1926 ("An Aerodynamic Theory of Turbine Design"). Whittle later concentrated on the simpler centrifugal compressor only, for a variety of practical reasons. A Whittle engine was the first turbojet to run, the Power Jets WU, on 12 April 1937. It was liquid-fuelled. Whittle's team experienced near-panic during the first start attempts when the engine accelerated out of control to a relatively high speed despite the fuel supply being cut off. It was subsequently found that fuel had leaked into the combustion chamber during pre-start motoring checks and accumulated in pools, so the engine would not stop accelerating until all the leaked fuel had burned off. Whittle was unable to interest the government in his invention, and development continued at a slow pace.

In Germany, Hans von Ohain patented a similar engine in 1935. His design, an axial-flow engine, as opposed to Whittle's centrifugal flow engine, was eventually adopted by most manufacturers by the 1950s.

On 27 August 1939 the Heinkel He 178, powered by von Ohain's design, became the world's first aircraft to fly using the thrust from a turbojet engine. It was flown by test pilot Erich Warsitz. The Gloster E.28/39, (also referred to as the "Gloster Whittle", "Gloster Pioneer", or "Gloster G.40") made the first British jet-engined flight in 1941. It was designed to test the Whittle jet engine in flight, and led to the development of the Gloster Meteor.

The first two operational turbojet aircraft, the Messerschmitt Me 262 and then the Gloster Meteor, entered service in 1944, towards the end of World War II, the Me 262 in April and the Gloster Meteor in July. Only about 15 Meteor saw WW2 action but up to 1400 Me 262s were produced, with 300 entering combat, delivering the first ground attacks and air combat victories of jet planes.

Air is drawn into the rotating compressor via the intake and is compressed to a higher pressure before entering the combustion chamber. Fuel is mixed with the compressed air and burns in the combustor. The combustion products leave the combustor and expand through the turbine where power is extracted to drive the compressor. The turbine exit gases still contain considerable energy that is converted in the propelling nozzle to a high speed jet.

The first turbojets, used either a centrifugal compressor (as in the Heinkel HeS 3), or an axial compressor (as in the Junkers Jumo 004) which gave a smaller diameter, although longer, engine. By replacing the propeller used on piston engines with a high speed jet of exhaust, higher aircraft speeds were attainable.

One of the last applications for a turbojet engine was Concorde which used the Olympus 593 engine. However, joint studies by Rolls-Royce and Snecma for a second generation SST engine using the 593 core were done more than three years before Concorde entered service. They evaluated bypass engines with bypass ratios between 0.1 and 1.0 to give improved take-off and cruising performance. Nevertheless, the 593 met all the requirements of the Concorde programme. Estimates made in 1964 for the Concorde design at Mach 2.2 showed the penalty in range for the supersonic airliner, in terms of miles per gallon, compared to subsonic airliners at Mach 0.85 (Boeing 707, DC-8) was relatively small. This is because the large increase in drag is largely compensated by an increase in powerplant efficiency (the engine efficiency is increased by the ram pressure rise which adds to the compressor pressure rise, the higher aircraft speed approaches the exhaust jet speed increasing propulsive efficiency).

Turbojet engines had a significant impact on commercial aviation. Aside from giving faster flight speeds turbojets had greater reliability than piston engines, with some models demonstrating dispatch reliability rating in excess of 99.9%. Pre-jet commercial aircraft were designed with as many as four engines in part because of concerns over in-flight failures. Overseas flight paths were plotted to keep planes within an hour of a landing field, lengthening flights. The increase in reliability that came with the turbojet enabled three- and two-engine designs, and more direct long-distance flights.

High-temperature alloys were a reverse salient, a key technology whose incomplete development dragged down progress on jet engines. Non-UK jet engines built in the 1930s and 1940s had to be overhauled every 10 or 20 hours due to creep failure and other types of damage to blades. British engines, however, utilised Nimonic alloys which allowed extended use without overhaul, engines such as the Rolls-Royce Welland and Rolls-Royce Derwent, and by 1949 the de Havilland Goblin, being type tested for 500 hours without maintenance. It was not until the 1950s that superalloy technology allowed other countries to produce economically practical engines.

== Early designs ==
Early German turbojets had severe limitations on the amount of running they could do due to the lack of suitable high temperature materials for the turbines. British engines such as the Rolls-Royce Welland used better materials, giving improved durability. The Welland was type-certified for 80 hours initially, later extended to 150 hours between overhauls, as a result of an extended 500-hour run being achieved in tests.

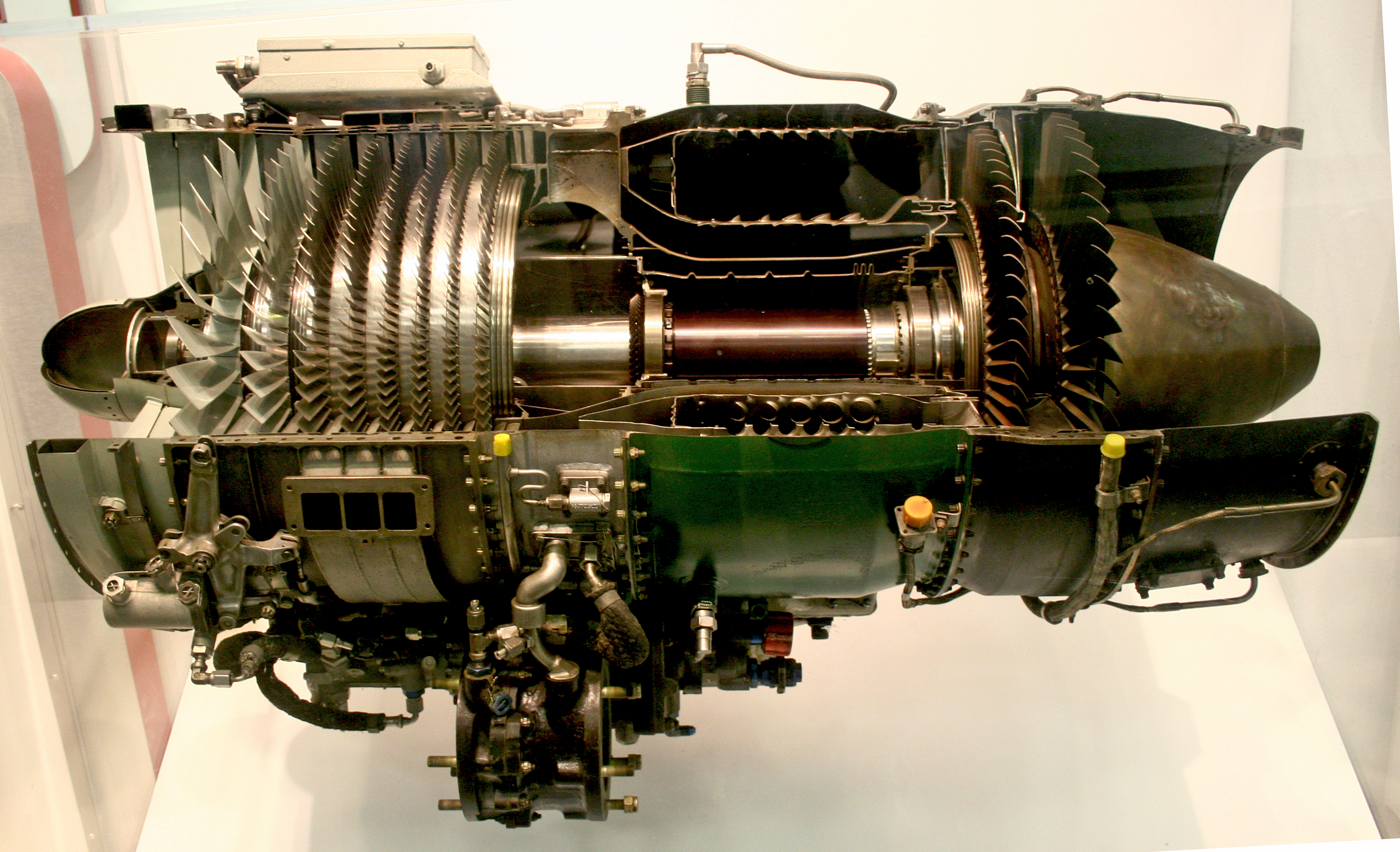
J85-GE-17A turbojet engine from General Electric (1970)

General Electric in the United States was in a good position to enter the jet engine business due to its experience with the high-temperature materials used in their turbosuperchargers during World War II.

Water injection was a common method used to increase thrust, usually during takeoff, in early turbojets that were thrust-limited by their allowable turbine entry temperature. The water increased thrust at the temperature limit, but prevented complete combustion, often leaving a very visible smoke trail.

Allowable turbine entry temperatures have increased steadily over time both with the introduction of superior alloys and coatings, and with the introduction and progressive effectiveness of blade cooling designs. On early engines, the turbine temperature limit had to be monitored, and avoided, by the pilot, typically during starting and at maximum thrust settings. Automatic temperature limiting was introduced to reduce pilot workload and reduce the likelihood of turbine damage due to over-temperature.

== Components ==
An animation of an axial compressor.

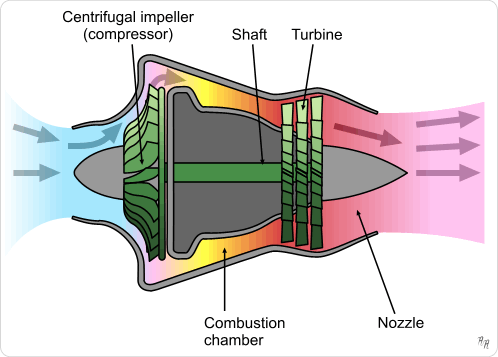
Schematic diagram showing the operation of a centrifugal flow turbojet engine. The compressor is driven by the turbine stage and throws the air outwards, requiring it to be redirected parallel to the axis of thrust.

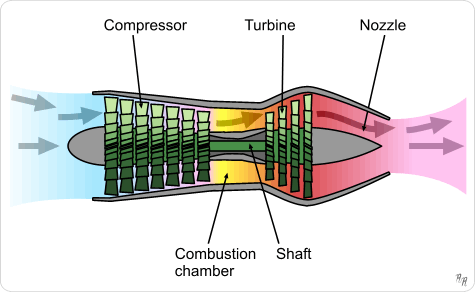
Schematic diagram showing the operation of an axial flow turbojet engine. Here, the compressor is again driven by the turbine, but the air flow remains parallel to the axis of thrust.

=== Nose bullet ===
A nose bullet is a component of a turbojet used to divert air into the intake, in front of the accessory drive and to house the starter motor.

=== Air intake ===
An intake, or tube, is needed in front of the compressor to help direct the incoming air smoothly into the rotating compressor blades. Older engines had stationary vanes in front of the moving blades. These vanes also helped to direct the air onto the blades. The air flowing into a turbojet engine is always subsonic, regardless of the speed of the aircraft itself.

The intake has to supply air to the engine with an acceptably small variation in pressure (known as distortion) and having lost as little energy as possible on the way (known as pressure recovery). The ram pressure rise in the intake is the inlet's contribution to the propulsion system's overall pressure ratio and thermal efficiency.

The intake gains prominence at high speeds when it generates more compression than the compressor stage. Well-known examples are the Concorde and Lockheed SR-71 Blackbird propulsion systems where the intake and engine contributions to the total compression were 63%/8% at Mach 2, and 54%/17% at over Mach 3. Intakes have ranged from "zero-length" on the Pratt & Whitney TF33 turbofan installation in the Lockheed C-141 Starlifter, to the twin 65 feet (20 m) long, intakes on the North American XB-70 Valkyrie, each feeding three engines with an intake airflow of about 800 pounds per second (360 kg/s).

=== Compressor ===
The turbine rotates the compressor at high speed, adding energy to the airflow while squeezing (compressing) it into a smaller space. Compressing the air increases its pressure and temperature. The smaller the compressor, the faster it turns. The (large) GE90-115B fan rotates at about 2,500 RPM, while a small helicopter engine compressor rotates around 50,000 RPM.

Turbojets supply bleed air from the compressor to the aircraft for the operation of various sub-systems. Examples include the environmental control system, anti-icing, and fuel tank pressurization. The engine itself needs air at various pressures and flow rates to keep it running. This air comes from the compressor, and without it, the turbines would overheat, the lubricating oil would leak from the bearing cavities, the rotor thrust bearings would skid or be overloaded, and ice would form on the nose cone. The air from the compressor, called secondary air, is used for turbine cooling, bearing cavity sealing, anti-icing, and ensuring that the rotor axial load on its thrust bearing will not wear it out prematurely. Supplying bleed air to the aircraft decreases the efficiency of the engine because it has been compressed, but then does not contribute to producing thrust.

Compressor types used in turbojets were typically axial or centrifugal. Early turbojet compressors had low pressure ratios up to about 5:1. Aerodynamic improvements including splitting the compressor into two separately rotating parts, incorporating variable blade angles for entry guide vanes and stators, and bleeding air from the compressor enabled later turbojets to have overall pressure ratios of 15:1 or more. After leaving the compressor, the air enters the combustion chamber.

=== Combustion chamber ===
The burning process in the combustor is significantly different from that in a piston engine. In a piston engine, the burning gases are confined to a small volume, and as the fuel burns, the pressure increases. In a turbojet, the air and fuel mixture burn in the combustor and pass through to the turbine in a continuous flowing process with no pressure build-up. Instead, a small pressure loss occurs in the combustor.

The fuel-air mixture can only burn in slow-moving air, so an area of reverse flow is maintained by the fuel nozzles for the approximately stoichiometric burning in the primary zone. Further compressed air is introduced which completes the combustion process and reduces the temperature of the combustion products to a level which the turbine can accept. Less than 25% of the air is typically used for combustion, as an overall lean mixture is required to keep within the turbine temperature limits.

=== Turbine ===
Hot gases leaving the combustor expand through the turbine. Typical materials for turbines include inconel and Nimonic. The hottest turbine vanes and blades in an engine have internal cooling passages. Air from the compressor is passed through these to keep the metal temperature within limits. The remaining stages do not need cooling.

In the first stage, the turbine is largely an impulse turbine (similar to a pelton wheel) and rotates because of the impact of the hot gas stream. Later stages are convergent ducts that accelerate the gas. Energy is transferred into the shaft through momentum exchange in the opposite way to energy transfer in the compressor. The power developed by the turbine drives the compressor and accessories, like fuel, oil, and hydraulic pumps that are driven by the accessory gearbox.

=== Nozzle ===
After the turbine, the gases expand through the exhaust nozzle producing a high velocity jet. In a convergent nozzle, the ducting narrows progressively to a throat. The nozzle pressure ratio on a turbojet is high enough at higher thrust settings to cause the nozzle to choke.

If, however, a convergent-divergent de Laval nozzle is fitted, the divergent (increasing flow area) section allows the gases to reach supersonic velocity within the divergent section. Additional thrust is generated by the higher resulting exhaust velocity.

==== Afterburner ====
An afterburner or "reheat jetpipe" is a combustion chamber added to reheat the turbine exhaust gases. The fuel consumption is very high, typically four times that of the main engine. Afterburners are used almost exclusively on supersonic aircraft, most being military aircraft. Two supersonic airliners, Concorde and the Tu-144, also used afterburners as does Scaled Composites White Knight, a carrier aircraft for the experimental SpaceShipOne suborbital spacecraft, and Boom XB-1, an experimental supersonic aircraft.

Reheat was flight-trialled in 1944 on the W.2/700 engines in a Gloster Meteor I.

== Thrust ==
=== Thrust augmentation ===
Thrust was most commonly increased in turbojets with water/methanol injection or afterburning. Some engines used both methods.

Liquid injection was tested on the Power Jets W.1 in 1941 initially using ammonia before changing to water and then water-methanol. A system to trial the technique in the Gloster E.28/39 was devised but never fitted.

==== Net thrust ====
The net thrust $F_N\;$ of a turbojet is given by:

$F_N =( \dot{m}_{air} + \dot{m}_f) V_{j} - \dot{m}_{air} V$

where:

$\dot{m}_{air}$	is the rate of flow of air through the engine
$\dot{m}_f$	is the rate of flow of fuel entering the engine
$V_j\;$	is the speed of the jet (the exhaust plume) and is assumed to be less than sonic velocity
$V\;$	is the true airspeed of the aircraft
$(\dot{m}_{air} + \dot{m}_f) V_j$	represents the nozzle gross thrust
$\dot{m}_{air} V$	represents the ram drag of the intake

If the speed of the jet is equal to sonic velocity the nozzle is said to be "choked". If the nozzle is choked, the pressure at the nozzle exit plane is greater than atmospheric pressure, and extra terms must be added to the above equation to account for the pressure thrust.

The rate of flow of fuel entering the engine is very small compared with the rate of flow of air. If the contribution of fuel to the nozzle gross thrust is ignored, the net thrust is:

$F_N = \dot{m}_{air} (V_{j} - V)$

The speed of the jet $V_j\;$ must exceed the true airspeed of the aircraft $V\;$if there is to be a net forward thrust on the airframe. The speed $V_j\;$ can be calculated thermodynamically based on adiabatic expansion.

== Cycle improvements ==
The operation of a turbojet is modelled approximately by the Brayton cycle.

The efficiency of a gas turbine is increased by raising the overall pressure ratio, requiring higher-temperature compressor materials, and raising the turbine entry temperature, requiring better turbine materials and/or improved vane/blade cooling. It is also increased by reducing the losses as the flow progresses from the intake to the propelling nozzle. These losses are quantified by compressor and turbine efficiencies and ducting pressure losses. When used in a turbojet application, where the output from the gas turbine is used in a propelling nozzle, raising the turbine temperature increases the jet velocity. At normal subsonic speeds this reduces the propulsive efficiency, giving an overall loss, as reflected by the higher fuel consumption, or SFC. However, for supersonic aircraft this can be beneficial, and is part of the reason why the Concorde employed turbojets. Turbojet systems are complex systems therefore to secure optimal function of such system, there is a call for the newer models being developed to advance its control systems to implement the newest knowledge from the areas of automation, so increase its safety and effectiveness.

== See also ==
- Air-start system
- Exoskeletal engine
- Jet car
- Turbine engine failure
- Turbojet development at the RAE
- Variable cycle engine
- Motorjet
