= Alan Arnold Griffith =

British engineer (1893–1963)

- Born: 13 June 1893
- Died: 13 October 1963 (aged 70)
- Education: University of Liverpool
- Known for: Fracture mechanics
- Awards: Fellow of the Royal Society
- Scientific career
- Workplaces: Royal Aircraft Establishment

Alan Arnold Griffith CBE FRS (13 June 1893 – 13 October 1963) was an English engineer and the son of Victorian science fiction writer George Griffith. Among many other contributions, he is best known for his work on stress and fracture in metals that is now known as metal fatigue, as well as being one of the first to develop a strong theoretical basis for the jet engine. Griffith's advanced axial-flow turbojet engine designs were integral in the creation of Britain's first operational axial-flow turbojet engine, the Metropolitan-Vickers F.2, which first ran successfully in 1941. Griffith, however, had little direct involvement in actually producing the engine, after he moved in 1939 from leading the engine department at the Royal Aircraft Establishment to start work at Rolls-Royce.

== Early work ==
A. A. Griffith took a first in mechanical engineering, followed by a master's degree and a Doctorate from the University of Liverpool. In 1915, he was accepted by the Royal Aircraft Factory as a trainee, before joining the Physics and Instrument Department the following year in what was soon renamed as the Royal Aircraft Establishment (or RAE).

Some of Griffith's earlier works remain in widespread use today. In 1917, he and G. I. Taylor suggested the use of soap films as a way of studying stress problems. Using this method a soap bubble is stretched out between several strings representing the edges of the object under study, and the coloration of the film shows the patterns of stress. This method, and similar ones, were used well into the 1990s, when computer modeling took over.

== Fracture mechanics ==
Griffith is more famous for a theoretical study on the nature of stress and failure due to crack propagation in brittle materials such as glass. His crack propagation criterion also applies to elastic materials. At the time it was generally taken that the strength of a material was E/10, where E was the Young's modulus for that material. However, it was well known that those materials would often fail at just a thousandth of this predicted value. Griffith discovered that there were many microscopic cracks in every material, and hypothesized that these cracks lowered the overall strength of the material. This was because any void in a solid, or scratch on the surface, concentrates stress, a fact already well known to machinists at the time. This concentration would allow the stress to reach E/10 at the tip of the crack long before it would seem to for the material as a whole.

From this work Griffith formulated his own theory of brittle fracture, using elastic strain energy concepts. His theory described the behaviour of crack propagation of an elliptical nature by considering the energy involved. Griffith described crack propagation in terms of the internal energy of the system in relation to the increase in the crack length described by the equation

$\frac{d(U_e+U_s+W)}{dc} = 0$

where U_{e} represents the elastic energy of the material, U_{s} represents the surface area of the crack, W represents the work applied to the sample and dc represents the increase in crack length.

This relation was used to establish Griffith's criterion, which states that when a crack is able to propagate enough to fracture a material, that the gain in the surface energy is equal to the loss of strain energy, and is considered to be the primary equation to describe brittle fracture. Because the strain energy released is directly proportional to the square of the crack length, it is only when the crack is relatively short that its energy requirement for propagation exceeds the strain energy available to it. Beyond the critical Griffith crack length, the crack becomes dangerous.

The work, published in 1920 ("The phenomenon of rupture and flow in solids"), resulted in a new awareness in many industries. The "hardening" of materials due to processes such as cold rolling was no longer mysterious. Aircraft designers were better able to understand why their designs had failed even though they were built much stronger than was thought necessary at the time, and soon turned to polishing their metals to remove cracks. This work was later generalised by G. R. Irwin and by R. S. Rivlin and A. G. Thomas, in the 1950s, applying it to almost all materials, not just brittle ones.

== Turbine engines ==
In 1926, Griffith published the seminal paper An Aerodynamic Theory of Turbine Design. He demonstrated that the woeful performance of existing turbines was due to a flaw in their design which meant the blades were "flying stalled", and proposed a modern airfoil shape for the blades that would dramatically improve their performance. The paper went on to describe an engine using an axial compressor and two-stage turbine, the first stage driving the compressor, the second a power-take-off shaft that would power a propeller. This early design was a forerunner of the turboprop engine. As a result of the paper, the Aeronautical Research Committee supported a small-scale experiment with a single-stage axial compressor and single-stage axial turbine. Work was completed in 1928 with a working tested design, and from this a series of designs was built to test various concepts.

At about this time, Frank Whittle wrote his thesis on turbine engines, using a centrifugal compressor and single-stage turbine, the leftover power in the exhaust being used to push the aircraft along. Whittle sent his paper to the Air Ministry in 1930, who passed it on to Griffith for comment. After pointing out an error in Whittle's calculations, he stated that the large frontal size of the compressor would make it impractical for aircraft use, and that the exhaust itself would provide little thrust. The Air Ministry replied to Whittle saying they were not interested in the design. Whittle was crestfallen, but was convinced by friends in the RAF to pursue the idea anyway. Whittle patented his design in 1930 and was able to start Power Jets in 1935 to develop it.

Griffith went on to become the principal scientific officer in charge of the new Air Ministry Laboratory in South Kensington. It was here that he invented the contraflow gas turbine, which used compressor/turbine discs alternately rotating in opposite directions. No stationary stator was required in between each spinning disc. It was difficult to design the blades for the correct amount of swirl and difficult to seal the compressor flow passage from the turbine flow passage. In 1931 he returned to the RAE to take charge of engine research, but it was not until 1938, when he became head of the Engine Department, that work on developing an axial-flow engine actually started. Hayne Constant joined the Engine Department, which started work on Griffith's original non-contraflow design, working with steam turbine manufacturer Metropolitan-Vickers (Metrovick).

After a short period, Whittle's work at Power Jets started to make major progress and Griffith was forced to re-evaluate his stance on using the jet directly for propulsion. A quick redesign in early 1940 resulted in the Metrovick F.2, which ran for the first time later that year. The F.2 was ready for flight tests in 1943 with a thrust of 2,150 lbf, and flew as replacement engines on a Gloster Meteor, the F.2/40 in November. The smaller engine resulted in a design that looked considerably more like the Me 262, and had improved performance. Nevertheless, the engine was considered too complex, and not put into production.

Griffith joined Rolls-Royce in 1939, working there until 1960, when he retired from his post as the company's Chief Scientist. He proposed an arrangement for a simple turbojet engine, which used an axial compressor and single stage turbine, called the AJ.65 and renamed Avon, the company's first production axial turbojet. He also proposed various bypass schemes, some too complex mechanically but including one which used 2 compressors in series, the arrangement subsequently used in the Conway. Griffith carried out pioneering studies into vertical take-off and landing (VTOL) technology, such as controlling in the hover using air jets. He proposed using batteries of small, simple, lightweight turbojets for lifting the aircraft in a horizontal attitude, a 'flat-riser'. Control in the hover was investigated using the Rolls-Royce Thrust Measuring Rig but using conventional engines with deflected thrust. A battery of four lift engines was used in the Short SC.1.

== Legacy ==
Griffith is commemorated in the annual A. A. Griffith Medal and Prize awarded by the Institute of Materials, Minerals and Mining for contributions to materials science. The award has been discontinued in 2021.
