= Reverse salient =

Insufficiently developed critical component limiting the whole system goals

A reverse salient refers to a component of a technological system that, due to its insufficient development, prevents the system in its entirety from achieving its development goals. The term was coined by Thomas P. Hughes, in his work Networks of power: Electrification in western society, 1880-1930.

== Technological systems and their evolution ==
Technological systems may refer to a hierarchically nested structure of technological parts, whereby the system is seen as a composition of interdependent sub-systems that are themselves systems comprising further sub-systems. In this manner the holistic system and its properties are seen to be synthesized through the sub-systems that constitute them. Technological systems may also be seen as socio-technical systems that contain both technical and social sub-systems, such as the creators and users of technology, as well as overseeing regulatory bodies. In both perspectives, technological systems are imputed to be goal-seeking, therefore evolving towards objectives.

Hughes proposed that technological systems pass through certain phases during their evolution. The first is invention and development, owed greatly to the efforts of inventors and entrepreneurs, such as Thomas Edison in the development of the electric technological system. The second is the era of technological transfer from one region or society to others, for example, the dissemination of Edison's electric system from New York City to London and Berlin. The third phase is of growth and expansion, marked by efforts to improve the system's performance, as in output efficiency. By this phase the system is dependent on the satisfactory evolution of ’’all’’ its components’ performances.

The development of technological systems is therefore reliant on reciprocated and interdependent cause and effect processes amongst social and technical components. It may be described as co-evolutionary, where the balanced co-evolution of system components carries significance in establishing desired system progress. Subsequently, a sub-system which evolves at a sufficient pace contributes positively to the collective development, while one which does not prevents the system from achieving its targeted goals. Hughes names these problematic sub-systems “reverse salients”.

== Reverse salients in technological system evolution ==
A reverse salient is the inverse of a salient that depicts the forward protrusion along an object's profile or a line of battle. Hence, reverse salients are the backward projections along similar, continuous lines. The reverse salient subsequently refers to the sub-system that has strayed behind the advancing performance frontier of the system due to its lack of sufficient performance. In turn, the reverse salient hampers the progress or prevents the fulfillment of potential development of the collective system. In line with the socio-technical standpoint, reverse salients can be technical elements such as motors and capacitors of an electric system, or social elements such as organizations or productive units.

Because reverse salients limit system development, the further development of the system lies in the correction of the reverse salient, where correction is attained through incremental or radical innovations. The reverse salient denotes a focusing device, in the words of Nathan Rosenberg, for technological system stakeholders, which strive to remove it through innovation. It is possible that the reverse salient is not able to be corrected within the bounds of the existing technological system through incremental innovations. Consequently, radical innovations may be needed to correct the reverse salient. However, radical innovations can lead to the creation of new and different technological systems, as witnessed in the emergence of the alternating current system that overcame the problem of low cost electricity distribution, which the direct current system could not.

Hence, the reverse salient is a useful concept for analyzing technological system evolution, because often the analysis of technological systems centers on the factors that limit system development. More than technical components, these factors may also be social components. Subsequently, reverse salients may be more applicable in certain contexts to denote system performance hindrance than similar or overlapping concepts such as bottleneck and technological imbalance or disequilibrium.

The reverse salient refers to an extremely complex situation in which individuals, groups, material forces, historical influences, and other factors have idiosyncratic, causal forces, and in which accidents as well as trends play a part. On the contrary, the disequilibrium concept suggests a relatively straightforward abstraction of physical science. Additionally, while the reverse salient and bottleneck concepts share similarities and have been used interchangeably in particular contexts, the reverse salient often refers to the sub-system that not only curbs the performance or output of the collective system but also requires correction because of its limiting affect. This is not necessarily the case with bottlenecks, which are geometrically too symmetrical and therefore do not represent the complexity of system evolution. For instance, a particular system's output performance may be compromised due to a bottleneck sub-system but the bottleneck will not require improvement if the system's present output performance is satisfactory. If, on the other hand, a higher level of performance would be required of the same system, the bottleneck may emerge as a reverse salient that holds the system back from attaining that higher output performance.

== Reverse salient examples ==
While numerous studies illustrate technological systems that have been hampered by reverse salients, the most seminal work in this field of study is that of Hughes, who gives a historical account of the development of Edison's direct-current electric system. In order to supply electricity within a defined region of distribution, sub-systems such as the direct current generator were identified as reverse salients and corrected. The most notable limitation of the direct-current system was, however, its low voltage transmission distance, and the resulting cost of distributing electricity beyond a certain range. To reduce costs, Edison introduced a three-wire system to replace the previously installed two-wire alternative and trialed different configuration of generators, as well as the usage of storage batteries. These improvements however did not correct the reverse salient completely. The satisfactory resolution of the problem was eventually provided by the radical innovation of the alternating current system.

Since Hughes' seminal work, other authors have also provided examples of reverse salients in different technological systems. In the ballistic missile technological development, where the systemic objective has been to increase missile accuracy, MacKenzie has identified the gyroscope sub-system as a technical reverse salient. Takeishi and Lee have argued that music copyright managing institutions have acted as a social reverse salient in the evolution of the mobile music technology system in Japan and Korea, where the objective was to proliferate mobile music throughout the end-user market. And further, Mulder and Knot, see the development of the PVC (polyvinyl chloride) plastic technology system to have been sequentially hampered by several states of reverse salience, including: difficulty to process PVC material, quality of manufactured products, health concerns for individuals exposed to effluent from PVC manufacturing facilities, and finally the carcinogenic nature of vinyl chloride.

== Analytical measure of reverse salience ==
The magnitude of reverse salience emerges as an informative parameter in technological systems analysis as it signifies not only the technological disparity between sub-systems but also the entire system's limited level of performance. Notwithstanding its importance, the literature studying technological system evolution has remained limited in terms of analytical tools that measure the state of reverse salience. Dedehayir and Mäkinen have subsequently proposed an absolute performance gap measure of reverse salience magnitude. This measure evaluates the technological performance differential between the salient sub-system (i.e. the advanced sub-system) and the reverse salient sub-system at a particular point in time. In turn, by evaluating a series of performance differentials over time, the performance gap measure helps reflect the dynamics of change in the evolving technological system through changing reverse salience magnitude.

== Origin of term ==
According to Thomas Hughes, the name "reverse salient" was inspired by the Verdun salient during the Battle of Verdun, which he claimed his history professor in college referred to as a "reverse salient". He described it as a backward bulge in the advancing line of a military front. This is the same as a salient; moreover, "reverse salient" is not a military term in general usage.
