= Stage loading =

Measure of load on turbomachinery stage

Stage Loading is a measure of the load on a turbomachinery stage, be it a part of a compressor, fan or turbine.

The parameter, which is non-dimensional, is defined as:

$L = \frac{gJ{\Delta}H}{U^2}$

where: Imperial Units (SI Units)

$g$ acceleration of gravity ft/s/s (1.0)

$J$ mechanical equivalent of heat ft.lb/(s.hp) (1.0)

${\Delta}H$ change in specific enthalpy over stage hp.s/lb (KW.s/Kg)

$U$ peripheral blade speed ft/s (m/s)

Average stage loading has a very similar definition, where the number of stages, n, within the compressor, fan or turbine is used to provide an average value:

$L = \frac{gJ{\Delta}H}{nU^2}$

In this case the change in enthalpy is across the whole unit, not just a stage. Similarly, the blade speed used is a mean for the whole device.

The above equation shows that if blade speed cannot be increased for, say, mechanical or aerodynamic reasons, the number of stages has to be increased to get the average stage loading back to an acceptable level, to obtain a satisfactory level of efficiency. The ideal average stage loading for a turbine is about 1.8.
