= Edward Greitzer =

American physicist

Edward M. Greitzer is an American physicist currently the H. N. Slater Professor of Aeronautics and Astronautics at Massachusetts Institute of Technology.

Greitzer was elected as a member into the National Academy of Engineering in 1995 for contributions to aircraft gas-turbine compressor aerodynamics and leadership of the MIT Gas Turbine Laboratory. He is also a Fellow of the American Institute of Aeronautics and Astronautics, Royal Academy of Engineering and ASME.

His vast research includes turbomachinery, fluid mechanics, thermodynamics, energy, internal flows, fluid systems and gas turbines and engine design.

== Education ==
- A.B. (Physics), 1962 Harvard College
- S.M. (Engineering), 1964 Harvard University
- Ph.D. 1970 (Mechanical Engineering), Harvard University
