= Hayne Constant =

English mechanical and aeronautical engineer

- Born: 26 September 1904
- Died: 12 January 1968 (aged 63)
- Education: Queens' College, Cambridge
- Awards: Fellow of the Royal Society
- Scientific career
- Workplaces: Imperial College London; University of Cambridge; Royal Aircraft Establishment; Ministry of Defence

Hayne Constant, CB, CBE., MA., FRAeS., FRS, (26 September 1904 – 12 January 1968) was an English mechanical and aeronautical engineer who developed jet engines during World War II.

== Education ==
Constant was born at Gravesend, the son of Frederick Charles Constant and his wife Mary Theresa (Tissie) Hayne. His father was a dental surgeon in Folkestone. Hayne was educated at King's College Choir School Cambridge, King's School, Canterbury, The Technical Institute Folkestone, Sir Roger Manwood's School, Sandwich and Queens' College, Cambridge.

== Career ==
Constant stayed at Cambridge for a post graduate year in 1927/28 and then joined the Royal Aircraft Establishment at Farnborough. He became a member of the Institution of Mechanical Engineers. After six years he joined Imperial College.

In 1936 Henry Tizard persuaded Constant to return to the RAE from Imperial College to help with the development of A. A. Griffith's turbine engine designs. A series of engines to Griffith's design were built under Constant's direction at the RAE. He was the Head of the Research Department at Power Jets (R&D) from 1944 to 1946. Hayne was director of the National Gas Turbine Establishment from 1948 to 1960, and was awarded the Gold Medal of the Royal Aeronautical Society in 1963 for his outstanding contribution to gas turbine development. In 1964 he became Chief Scientist (R.A.F.) at the Ministry of Defence.

Constant died unmarried at the age of 63.
