= DTC =

The DTC may refer to:

== Places ==
- Desert Training Center, a World War II training area located mostly in southwestern California and western Arizona
- Downtown Transit Center (TC), San Joaquin Regional Transit District
- Denver Technological Center, a business park in Denver and Greenwood Village, Colorado

== Companies and organizations ==
- Developmental Test Command, a component of the United States Army
- Defence Technology Centres, British military research facilities
- Delhi Transport Corporation, the bus transport provider in Delhi
- Depository Trust Company, American securities depository, subsidiary of Depository Trust & Clearing Corporation (DTCC)
- Diamond Trading Company, rough diamonds sales and distribution arm of De Beers
- Digital Trust Center, former Dutch government organisation and platform with the aim to help businesses with cyber security
- Doctoral Training Centres, British centres for managing PhD studies
- Discount Tire Company, an American tire and wheel retailer

== Software ==
- Direct-threaded code, a compiler implementation technique.
- Distributed Transaction Coordinator, in Microsoft Servers for a subsystem concerned with atomic transactions across multiple datastores
- Domain Technologie Control, a Web-based control panel for admin and accounting for hosting web and e-mail services
- Diagnostic Trouble Code, in the automotive industry, codes that are prescribed by SAE standards to help track problems in a vehicle detected by its on-board computer

== Sports ==
- Danish Touring Car Championship, Danish touring car racing series
- Deutsche Tourenwagen Cup, a former German touring car racing series
- Distance to conversion, in chess endgames

== Business methods and techniques ==
- Design-to-cost, a cost management technique
- Direct-to-consumer, business model focusing on e-commerce of a single product category
- Direct to Consumer (Retail), describes the sales channel where the original equipment manufacturer sells directly to the consumer (instead of using wholesale channel)
- Direct-to-consumer advertising, the term for sale of goods without intermediary third parties

== Arts and entertainment ==
- DTC: Yukemuri Junjo Hen from High & Low, 2018 Japanese film
- High&Low: The DTC, 2017 Japanese streaming show

== Tax ==
- Direct Taxes Code, changes in tax slabs
- Disability Tax Credit, Canadian benefit

== Science ==
- Dithiocarbamate, a chemical
- d-tubocurare, a neuromuscular blocking agent
- Digital-to-time converter (a.k.a. digital delay generator), an electronic circuit or piece of equipment that generates precise delays defined by a digital control signal
- Dimension Time Cost model
- Digitally tuned capacitor, a type of electrical capacitor whose capacitance can be changed by means of a digital control signal
- Direct Torque Control, a method to control electric motors with very good torque dynamics
- Direct traffic control, a method of authorizing track occupancy on American railroads
- Dynamic Traction Control, a system that controls a car's traction according to many conditions

== Other ==
- dtc (trigraph), in linguistics

== See also ==
- .510 DTC EUROP bullet
