= Marty Bradley =

American aerospace engineer

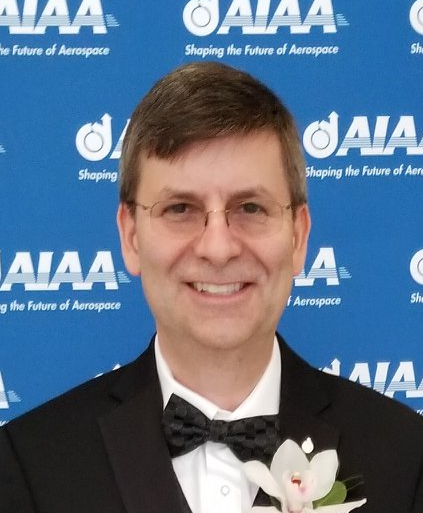

Academic background
- Education: University of Southern California (PhD)
- Thesis: Flow Models for the Design of a Hypersonic Iodine Vapor Wind Tunnel Nozzle with Chemical and Vibrational Nonequilibrium Effects (1994)

Marty Bradley is an American aerospace engineer who specializes in advanced propulsion, electric aircraft, and sustainable aviation. He is a fellow of the American Institute of Aeronautics and Astronautics (AIAA), an adjunct professor of aerospace and mechanical engineering practice at the University of Southern California (USC), and a sustainable aviation consultant.

== Education and career ==
Bradley received his Ph.D. in aerospace engineering from USC in 1994. He worked for Northrop Corporation in the 1980s, Rockwell International in the 1990s, then at Boeing until 2020, advancing to the position of Boeing Technical Fellow. In 2020, he joined Electra.aero, a hybrid-electric aircraft company.

== Research and projects ==
In the 1990s, Bradley specialized in propulsion integration for hypersonic vehicles such as missiles and airplanes, and was the leader of the nozzle team for the Rockwell X-30. He authored test standards documents for nozzle and flowpath testing.

Later, Bradley was involved in the Transonic Truss-Braced Wing (TTBW) project. The TTBW is an experimental aircraft demonstrator designed with a long wingspan that burns much less fuel than traditional jet liners. This was originally part of the Subsonic Ultra Green Aircraft Research (SUGAR) program, a series of NASA studies that investigated future technologies that would burn less fossil fuels, with the goal of predicting the technology and designs of commercial aircraft around the years 2030–2050. Bradley was the principal investigator for SUGAR. Boeing designed a low-emission aircraft concept called the Sugar Volt as part of this program.

While at Boeing, Bradley created test plans for aviation biofuel demonstrations. Aviation biofuel was later approved and used industry-wide. The use of aviation biofuel reduces net carbon dioxide emissions from aircraft. He also created a life-cycle assessment (LCA) tool for aircraft called qUWick, and integrated it into Boeing's commercial aircraft design process, which helps to evaluate the environmental impact of potential new aircraft.

In a paper in Nature in 2022, Bradley and his co-authors investigated what would be needed to drive forward the fledgling electric aircraft industry, and concluded that batteries with high watt hours per kilogram and high safety and reliability were the main bottlenecks. The paper concluded that with sufficient research and investment, 600 watt hour per kilogram batteries suitable for the mass production of short-range electric aircraft could be developed within a decade.

== AIAA ==
Bradley became an American Institute of Aeronautics and Astronautics (AIAA) fellow in 2018. He helped create and was the first chairman of the High Speed Airbreathing Propulsion Technical Committee and the yearly Electric Aircraft Technology Symposium (EATS).
