= HyShot =

Australia hypersonic project 2000-2007

HyShot is a research project of The University of Queensland, Australia Centre for Hypersonics, to demonstrate the possibility of supersonic combustion under flight conditions using two scramjet engines, one designed by The University of Queensland and one designed by QinetiQ (formerly the MOD's Defence Evaluation & Research Agency).

== Overview ==
The project has involved the successful launch of one engine designed by The University of Queensland, and one launch of the scramjet designed by the British company QinetiQ. Each combustion unit was launched on the nose of a Terrier-Orion Mk70 sounding rocket on a high ballistic trajectory, reaching altitudes of approximately 330 km. The rocket was rotated to face the ground, and the combustion unit ignited for a period of 6–10 seconds while falling between 35 km and 23 km at around Mach 7.6. The system is not designed to produce thrust.

- The first HyShot flight was on 30 October 2001 but was a failure due to the rocket going off course.
- The first successful launch (Hyshot II) was of a University of Queensland scramjet on 30 July 2002. (There has been much analysis of the data obtained in flight and comparison with results from experiments conducted in ground-testing facilities.) (It is believed by many to be the first successful flight of a scramjet engine, although some dispute this and point primarily to earlier tests by Russian scientists. Also of note was the successful achievement of thrust by GASL scramjets launched on June 20 and July 26, 2001 under DARPA sponsorship.)
- A second successful flight (HyShot III) using a QinetiQ scramjet was achieved on 25 March 2006. The later QinetiQ prototype is cylindrical with four stainless steel combustors around the outside. The aerodynamics of the vehicle is improved by this arrangement but it was expensive to manufacture.
- The HyShot IV flight on 30 March 2006 launched successfully, and telemetry was received, however it is believed that the scramjet did not function as expected. Data analysis is required to confirm what occurred.
- HyCAUSE was launched on 15 June 2007. (The HyCAUSE experiment differed from the HyShot launches in that a Talos-Castor combination was used for launch and the target Mach number was 10.)

The carrier rocket for the HyShot experiments was composed of a RIM-2 Terrier first stage (6 second burn, 4000 km/h) and an Orion second stage (26 second burn, 8600 km/h, 56 km altitude). A fairing over the payload was then jettisoned. The package then coasted to an altitude of around 300 km. Cold gas nitrogen attitude control thrusters were used to re-orient the payload for atmospheric reentry. The experiments each lasted for some 5 seconds as the payload descended between approximately 35 and 23 kilometers altitude, when liquid hydrogen fuel was fed to the scramjet. Telemetry reported results to receivers on the ground for later analysis. The payload landed about 400 km down range from the launch site, at which time its temperature was still expected to be about 300 degrees Celsius, which may be enough to cause a small brush fire and thereby make spotting and recovery easier even though a radio beacon was in the payload.

=== Legacy ===
The team continues to work as part of the Australian Hypersonics Initiative, a joint program of The University of Queensland, the Australian National University and the University of New South Wales' Australian Defence Force Academy campus, the governments of Queensland and South Australia and the Australian Defence Department.

The Hyshot program spawned the HyCAUSE (Hypersonic Collaborative Australian/United States Experiment) program : a collaborative effort between the United States’ Defense Advanced Research Projects Agency (DARPA) and Australia's Defence Science and Technology Organisation (DSTO), also representing the research collaborators in the Australian Hypersonics Initiative (AHI).

All tests were conducted at the Woomera Test Range in South Australia.

== HIFiRE program ==
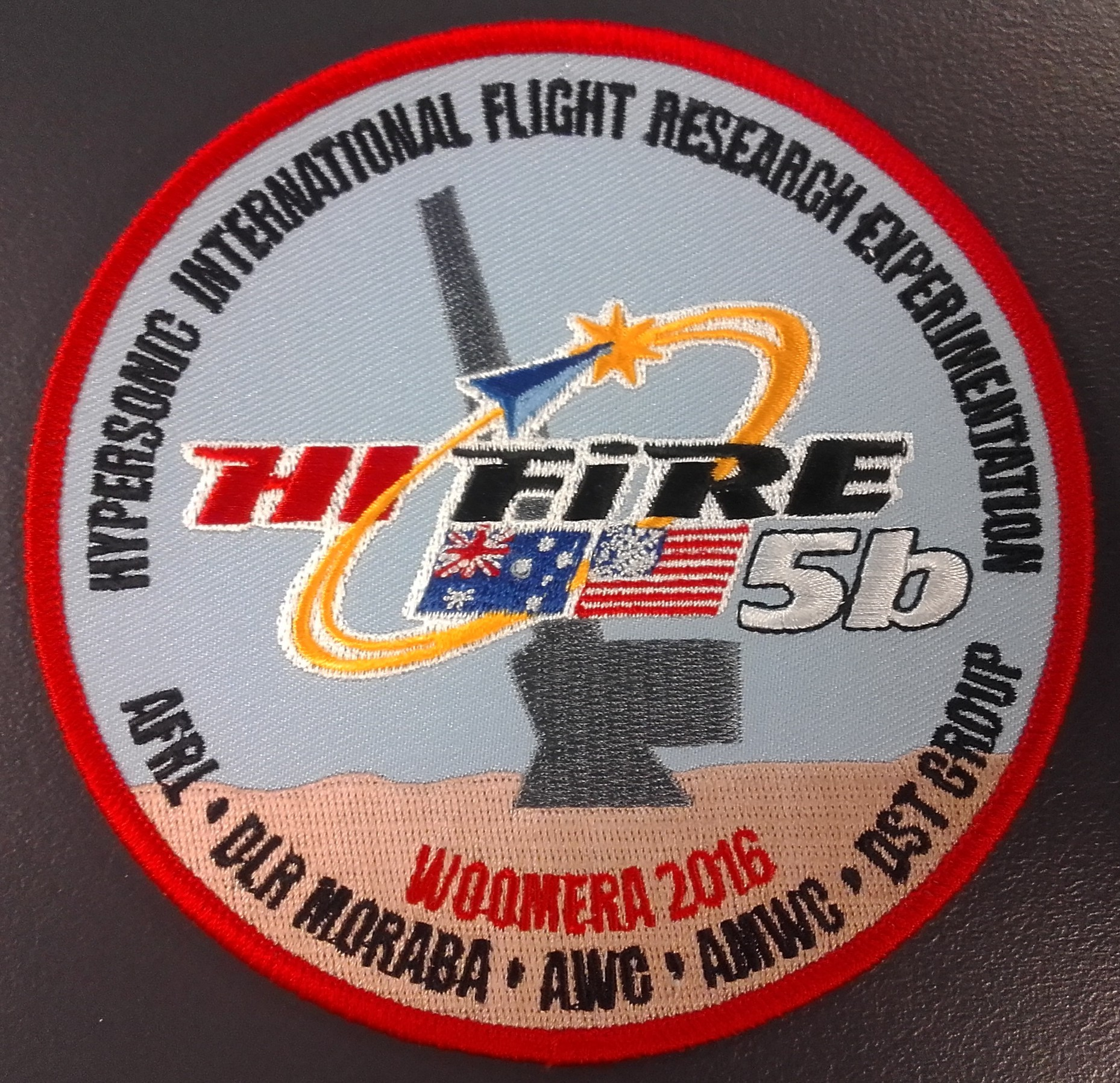
Badge of the HiFire 5b launch program.

The Hypersonic International Flight Research Experimentation (HIFiRE) program was created jointly by DSTO (now DSTG) and the Air Force Research Laboratory (AFRL). HIFiRE was formed to investigate hypersonic flight technology, the fundamental science and technology required, and its potential for next generation aeronautical systems. Boeing is also a commercial partner in the project. This will involve up to ten flights with The University of Queensland involved in at least the first three:

- HyShot V — A free-flying hypersonic glider
- HyShot VI — A free-flying Mach 8 scramjet
- HyShot VII - Sustained Mach 8 scramjet-powered flight

== See also ==
- Scramjet
- NASA X-43
- Boeing X-51
