= Tupolev Tu-2000 =

Soviet hypersonic aircraft

Tu-2000
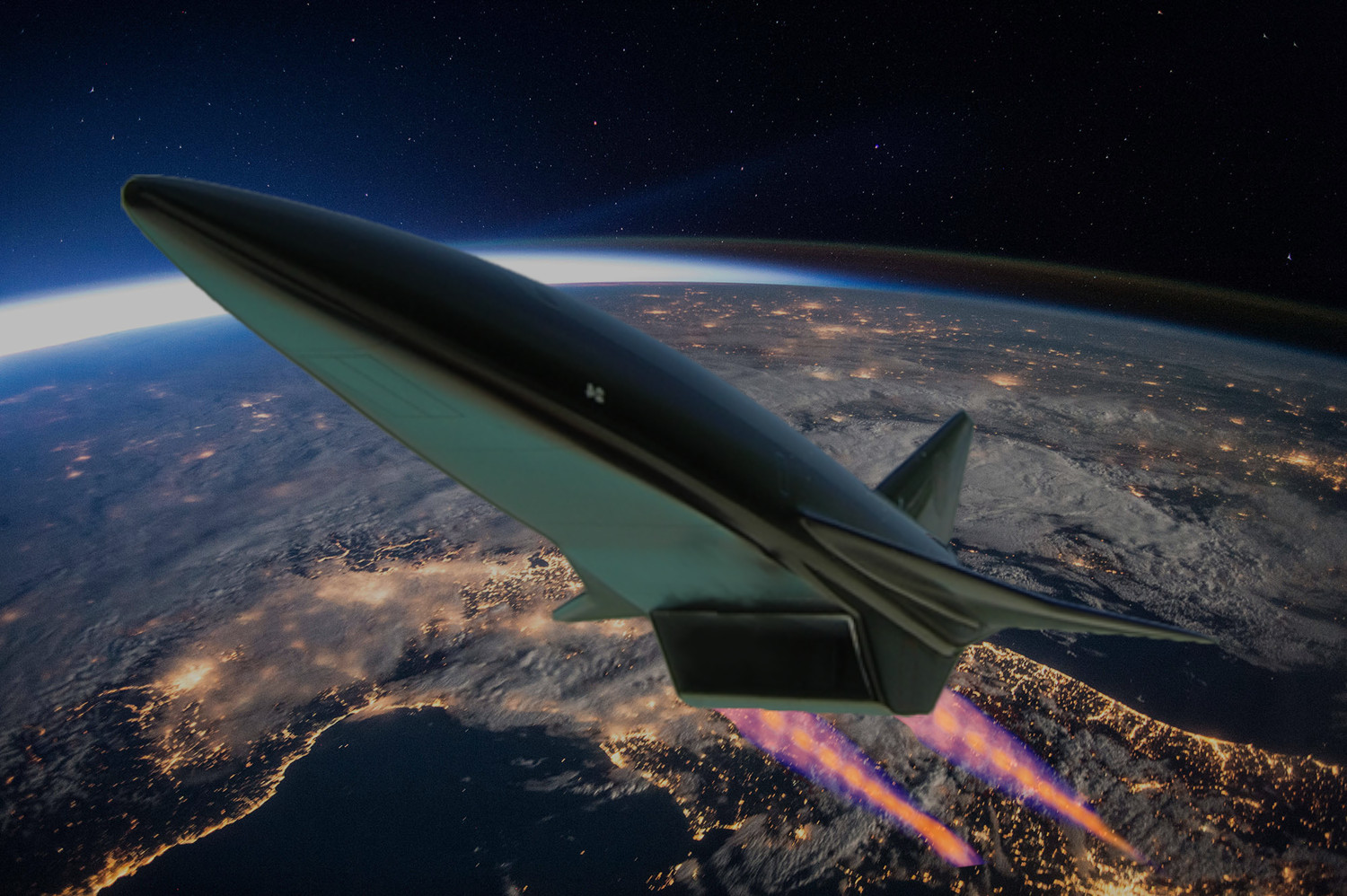
- Artist's impression of the Tu-2000 entering orbit around Earth

General information
- Type: Hypersonic technology demonstrator
- Manufacturer: Tupolev OKB
- Status: Cancelled
- Number built: 0

History
- Variant: Tupolev Tu-360

The Tupolev Tu-2000 was a planned hypersonic flight experimental aircraft designed by the Tupolev design bureau. It was intended to test technologies for a single-stage-to-orbit aerospace plane and also the Tupolev Tu-360 intercontinental bomber.

== Design and development ==
Development of the Tu-2000 began in 1986 as a Soviet response to the X-30 project in the US. Following the fall of the Soviet Union, Russia took over the project and pursued it until 1992, when it was suspended due to lack of funds.

The experimental technology demonstrator would have weighed 70–90 tonnes (150,000–200,000 lb) with a length of 60 m (196 ft), while the single-stage-to-orbit vehicle would have weighed 210–280 tonnes (460,000–620,000 lb) and carried a maximum payload of 10 tonnes (22,000 lb) into earth orbits 200–400 km (120–250 mi) high.

Work on the project began in the 1970s. The Tupolev Design Bureau began the development of an aerospace plane with a launch weight of about 300 tonnes (660,000 lb). Various propulsion methods were considered, such as liquid rocket engine on fuel elements, aircraft nuclear propulsion, plasma engine, or an ion engine.

The reason for the appearance of the Soviet Air Defense was the appearance of the US Space Shuttle. Works were activated in 1981. Three years later, an aerospace system based on a single-stage orbital aircraft with a liquid-propellant rocket engine was proposed, which could be launched both from the ground and from aircraft carriers. However, to increase efficiency and increase the fuel stock, a variant with a combined power plant of a turbojet engine, ramjet engine, and a liquid rocket engine was soon adopted, which became the prototype of the Tu-2000.

The aircraft was designed as a tailless aircraft, and had an engine and triangular wing low extension located under fuselage. The core of the design was the power plant, which included:

- 4 turbojet engines in the rear fuselage;
- 1 main accelerating wide-range ramjet (located at the rear of the fuselage);
- 2 liquid fuel rocket engines for maneuvering in vacuum (installed between the turbojets).

The large number of engines was required to optimize efficiency in different flight modes. Most of the aircraft's volume was occupied by liquid hydrogen fuel tanks. The crew of two people was located in the nose of the fuselage. An automatic crew rescue system was to provide an escape route at all altitudes. The bow section, including the cabin, was detachable. Two escape options were considered: rescued by parachute from the cockpit and an ejection seat.

Radio and electronic equipment was located behind the flight deck. The nose strut chassis was removed in the same compartment. The middle and rear parts of the fuselage held the liquid hydrogen fuel tank. The liquid oxygen tank supplying oxidizer for the rocket engines was located in the tail of the fuselage. Liquid hydrogen was used as fuel for all engines and came from a single fuel system.

The aircraft was designed with tricycle landing gear. The front gear had twin small diameter wheels with high pressure tyres. The main landing gear was to be single-wheeled, retracting to the fuselage compartments.

The VKS was supposed to take off from standard runways up to 3 km (1.9 mi) long, fly back to subsonic speed after takeoff to reach the set starting point of acceleration and before landing for approach to a given airfield; carry out flights to change the airfield base, quickly perform acceleration to a given speed and altitude, including access to a circular orbit; perform multiple orbital maneuvers; perform an autonomous orbital flight of up to a day; perform cruising flight in the atmosphere with hypersonic speeds, perform deceleration with deceleration when returning from orbit; in the process of acceleration to orbital parameters and in the process of descending, perform maneuvering for the passage of a given route and exit to a given orbit and a given airfield; change the orbital flight plane.

Acceleration of the work contributed to the information about the Rockwell X-30 project, a technology demonstrator for the US National Aero-Space Plane (NASP) project. In 1986, two government decrees were issued to develop a similar project. On September 1 of the same year, the Ministry of Defense was released technical task to single-stage reusable video conferencing, capable of solving problems in the atmosphere and near space and performing high-speed intercontinental transatmospheric transportation.

It was planned to implement the project in two stages:

1. Creation of a Tu-2000A aircraft with a flight weight of 70–90 tonnes (150,000–200,000 lb) and a speed of Mach 6 at an altitude of 30 km (98,000 ft). The VKS was to be 60 m (200 ft) long; with a wing span of 14 m (46 ft); and a 70-degree leading edge wing sweep.
2. The second stage assumed various implementation options: Tu-2000B, MVKS, and a hypersonic airliner.
- The Tu-2000B was a double bomber, which had a range of 10,000 km (5,400 nmi) and a take-off weight of 350 tonnes (770,000 lb). Six engines provided a speed of Mach 6 at an altitude of 30 km (19 mi).
- The MVKS version was to have a take-off weight of 260 tonnes (570,000 lb), a flight ceiling of over 60 km (200,000 ft), and a speed of Mach 15–25. It would carry a load of 8–10 tonnes (18,000–22,000 lb) into a 200 km (110 nmi) orbit.
- Detailed study of the hypersonic liner proposal was not carried out, because it was not considered a priority.

By the time of the collapse of the USSR the project was in full swing. Perestroika resulted in lower project costs. However, by December 1991, many structural elements had already been manufactured: the nickel alloy wing torque box, part of the fuselage, cryogenic fuel tanks, and composite fuel lines. For comparison, at the time the US X-30 project was stuck on an attempt to build a titanium alloy section of the fuselage. The Tu-2000 could have been completed by the year 2000, but circumstances had changed.

Due to lack of funding in the summer of 1992, the project was declassified and had to be transferred to a commercial basis. The layout of the MVKS was presented at the Mosaeroshow-92 exhibition. The country's top leadership promised to support the project to raise the country's prestige, but did nothing. Soon, funding was discontinued altogether.

At 1995 prices, the cost of building one Tu-2000 was estimated at $450 million, and the cost of development work estimated as $5.29 billion. At a rate of 20 starts per year, the cost of one start should have been $13.6 million. With adequate funding, the project could have been completed in 13–15 years, but in 1993 the Tu-2000 was cancelled.

== Specifications (Single-stage-to-orbit design) ==
Data from

General characteristics

- Crew: two
- Capacity: 8,000 kilograms (18,000 lb) payload
- Length: 72 m (236 ft 3 in)
- Wingspan: 14 m (45 ft 11 in)
- Diameter: 13 m (42 ft 8 in)
- Max takeoff weight: 280,000 kg (617,294 lb)
- Powerplant: 7 × liquid hydrogen with liquid oxygen oxidizer 4 turbojets, 1 scramjet, and 2 rockets

Performance

- Maximum speed: Mach 25 (in orbit)
