= Modular Advanced Armed Robotic System =

Robot that is being developed by Qinetiq

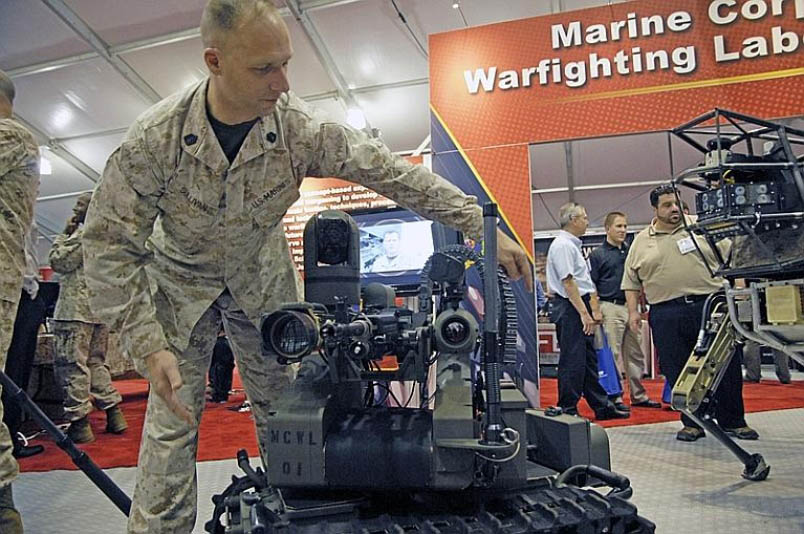
A US Marine with the remote-controlled Modular Advanced Armed Robotic System (MAARS) in 2012

The Modular Advanced Armed Robotic System (MAARS) is a robot that is being developed by Qinetiq. A member of the TALON family, it will be the successor to the armed SWORDS robot. It has a different, larger chassis than the SWORDS robot, so has little physically in common with the SWORDS and TALON

== Design ==
The MAARS platform was designed for reconnaissance, surveillance, and target acquisition (RSTA) to increase security at forward locations. It can be configured for non-lethal, less-lethal, and lethal effects. The system weighs 369 lb (167 kg) fully loaded with sensors, weapons, and ammunition. Its battery can last 3–12 hours, with a sleep mode to last for up to one week. The MAARS can move at 7 mph (11.27 km/h) and travel 800–1000 meters from its controller. It has 7 cameras for driving, situational awareness, and for the weapon that can operate in daytime or thermal modes. MAARS is armed with an M240B machine gun and four M203 grenade launcher tubes on a 360 degree rotating turret. It carries 450 rounds of 7.62×51mm NATO bullets and four 40mm grenades in the 4 M203s. Grenades can include sponge, buckshot and tear gas for less-lethal purposes, while high explosive and airburst for lethal purposes. Each tube is loaded individually, allowing lethal and less-lethal capabilities to be available and selected when needed. Other features include an on-board loudspeaker to communicate, a siren, a laser dazzler, and a gunfire detection system. The weapons system can be replaced with a manipulator arm that can lift 120 lb (54 kg), making it able to pick up 155 mm artillery rounds, and can pull over 300 lb (140 kg).

== History ==
On 5 June 2008, QinetiQ announced it had shipped the first MAARS robot to the U.S. Military under a contract from the Explosive Ordnance Disposal/Low-Intensity Conflict (EOD/LIC) Program. On 5 August 2008, the MAARS participated in a demonstration to showcase technology for the battlefield and urban environments. Its exercise was a traffic control point encounter with a suspected suicide bomber or vehicle-emplaced explosive. In another scenario, the MAARS provided overwatch as a different robot attached an explosive charge to a door for door breaching. After the door was blown open by that explosive charge, MAARS entered the doorway, encountered hostile fire, and returned fire with its machine gun.

One obstacle to the deployment of MAARS, and armed unmanned ground vehicles in general, is the reluctance of military leaders to utilize remote-controlled weapon systems at ground level. One concern is collateral damage, as 7.62 NATO bullets fired by the machine gun can travel further than sensors mounted on the robot. The Defense Department is in agreement that any lethal force applied by an unmanned system will be decided by an individual, not by the system autonomously. Ground combat commanders prefer to perfect autonomy for UGVs for supply purposes to lighten infantrymens' loads. Autonomous ground robots that could shoot have been compared to land mines, in that they can't be directly controlled. Although remote weapon systems have been successfully used on vehicles, there is question on how far a remote-controlled platform can be stretched, from a guard tower for perimeter defense or through a mobile platform. SWORDS robots deployed to Iraq were placed in fixed locations and behind sandbags, as senior officials were not comfortable using them to seek out and shoot enemy combatants. QinetiQ North America has said that despite press reports claiming that SWORDS was only there briefly, they were deployed for six years and performed the combat role of serving the protection of a site. The Maneuver Center of Excellence at Fort Benning asked for a demonstration of MAARS in fall 2013, and the Marine Corps is continuing to investigate the possibility of employing it as well. Army officers hope to use armed ground robots as part of an infantry squad, rather than a substitute for them. They planned to have an armed system in use by 2018.

From 7-10 October 2013, the MAARS took part in testing, along with other systems, at Fort Benning as part of the U.S. Army's Armed Unmanned Ground Vehicle (AUGV) program. The program objective is to find an unmanned robotic platform to conduct reconnaissance missions and maneuver with infantry units to help engage and destroy the enemy. Tests included moving to a firing point, firing an M240 medium machine gun at targets up to 800 meters away, and then leaving the area. Reliability of control at various distances was also looked at for safety reasons. The effect of the machine gun on the platforms was reviewed to observe how the size, weight, and stability of the platforms affect accuracy at range. The armed ground robots were not autonomous and always had a human controller.

The MAARS was displayed at a U.S. Marine Corps defense expo on 28 January 2015. The Marine Corps Warfighting Laboratory hopes to have an armed UGV like MAARS to provide more firepower on foot patrols, since medium machine guns are usually not taken with them; it can also "stand post" for 12 hours or be left in sleep mode for more than a week. With a handheld controller, a MAARS operator can receive a surveillance feed from thermal and video cameras. The Marines found it to have limitations, such as being too small to ram through doors to enter a room and being too big to move smoothly through tight corridors.
