= Omni-ID =

American company

Omni-ID, Ltd.
- Company type: Private
- Industry: Radio-frequency identification
- Founded: 2007
- Headquarters: Rochester, New York, United States
- Key people: President and CEO: Tony Kington
- Products: RFID Tags
- Parent: HID GLOBAL (AssaAbloy Group)
- Website: http://www.omni-id.com

Omni-ID is a vendor of passive UHF Radio-frequency identification (RFID) tags, founded in 2007 as Omni-ID, Ltd. It produces a range of RFID tags designed to operate in all environments, including on metal and liquids.

== History ==
=== Founding ===
The company is based on a research unit that was formed within QinetiQ, an international defence technology company that was spun off from the former UK government agency Defence Evaluation and Research Agency (DERA) when it was split up in June 2001.

One of the problems the research unit studied was the difficulty reading radio frequency identification (RFID) tags placed close to metals and liquids. On August 22, 2007, Omni-ID was granted UK patent number GB2429878 for an "electromagnetic radiation decoupler". With a working RFID tag that overcame those difficulties, the design was commercialized by launching a new company, Omni-ID, in March 2007. Initial funding was provided by Cody Gate Ventures LLP a technology venture fund created in 2007 by QinetiQ and Coller Capital. An additional US$15 million in Series C funding was provided to Omni-ID by Cody Gate Ventures in February 2009.

=== HID GLOBAL ===
In 2021, HID Global acquired Omni-ID.

== Products ==
The core principle of the passive RFID tag design marketed by Omni-ID was that it contained a complex proprietary arrangement of metal layers within the tag which reflected and boosted the signal broadcast from an RFID reader. This allowed the tag to be read accurately even when placed on metal, on a liquid container, or when immersed. This was confirmed in independent testing in November, 2008.

The company offers five different tag designs named Ultra, Max, Flex, Prox, and Curv, each with a different read range based on the trade-off between tag size and performance. The Ultra tag has the longest read range of up to 135 ft. with a stationary reader. The Max tag has a long read range and is designed for tracking conveyances and outdoor assets. The Max HD is a long-range global tag for use in all regions.

The thin, low-profile Flex tag has a medium range. The small Prox tag has the shortest read range, 4m, and is often used for tracking high value IT assets. The small, flexible Curv tag is for use on cylindrical objects.

In October 2008, the company announced a new product, OmniTether, to attach RFID tags to items with insufficient surface area for normal attachment methods. A Service Bureau was also launched to simplify RFID tag commissioning. Omni-ID prints a barcode and human-readable information on the outer label, and pre-commissions tags with a customer's inventory and associated EPC coding.

In November 2008, the company announced Omni-ID On Demand for their Prox RFID tag, to print, encode and deploy Omni-ID tags, and applied for a patent.

In September 2009, the long range passive Ultra tag was introduced with a read range of 135 ft. with a stationary RFID reader.

== Awards ==
In April, 2008, Omni-ID was a finalist and the second runner-up at the RFID Journal Awards.

Omni-ID was awarded the 2009 Asia Pacific Frost & Sullivan Technology Innovation Award for UHF RFID Tags.
