= Shcramjet =

Shock-induced combustion ramjet engine

A shock-induced combustion ramjet engine (abbreviated as shcramjet; also called oblique detonation wave engine; also called standing oblique detonation ramjet (sodramjet); or simply referred to as shock-ramjet engine) is a concept of air-breathing ramjet engine, proposed to be used for hypersonic and/or single-stage-to-orbit propulsion applications.

== Design ==
The shcramjet engine geometry is simple and similar to scramjet, varying only in the combustor design. The engine includes a supersonic inlet followed by a combustion chamber and a nozzle, respectively. The inlet design is similar to a scramjet, in which the whole nose structure is used as inlet. Combustion in a shcramjet can occur in shock-induced combustion or detonation combustion, depending on the strength of the inducing shock. If ignition occurs far enough downstream that the ensuing combustion process does not influence the preceding shock, the combustion is said to be shock-induced. However, for extremely fast reactions, ignition occurs close to the preceding shock wave and the combustion couples with the shock wave and forms a detonation wave. Therefore, detonation wave ramjet, or oblique detonation wave engine, is a particular case of shcramjet.

Though shock and detonation waves are related to high pressure loss during combustion, the theoretical total pressure loss associated with shcramjet combustor approaches that of the scramjet engine at increasing mach numbers. This fact, together with the simpler engine geometry with concomitant increase in component efficiencies, results in superior predicted performance at flight Mach numbers beyond 12.

== Oblique detonation wave engine ==
This engine funnels a mixture of air and fuel at hypersonic speeds (more than five times the speed of sound) toward a ramp, which creates a shock wave. This shock wave heats the mixture and causes it to detonate, ejecting exhaust gasses. Such an approach burns nearly 100% of the fuel. In theory, vehicle speeds could reach 17 times the speed of sound.

A critical challenge is to confine the detonation in a small area, without allowing it to direct energy upstream towards the fuel source or downstream where it loses force. In 2021 an experimental device maintained a detonation in a fixed location for 3 seconds, far longer than earlier attempts.

== Scramjet ==
A shcramjet engine is similar to a scramjet engine; however, unlike the diffusive mode of combustion in a scramjet engine, shcramjet engine combustion takes place across a thin region of standing oblique shock and/or detonation waves stabilized over a wedge, blunt body, etc. Since combustion is confined to a narrow region across the igniting wave, the combustor length in a shcramjet can be significantly shorter than the scramjet, which requires a lengthy combustor for complete fuel-air mixing and combustion. Also, the shcramjet is believed to have a better overall propulsive performance than the scramjet at higher Mach numbers, especially above Mach 12. Recent researches have stipulated that shcramjet, alongside its other airbreathing variants, can act as an efficient high-speed vehicle propulsion system for SSTO flights. These potential advantages have attracted substantial research on propulsive applications, as well as on the fundamental physical phenomena.
