= Q-Net =

Armor system

The Q-NET is an add-on armor kit developed by QinetiQ to counter the threat of rocket-propelled grenades.

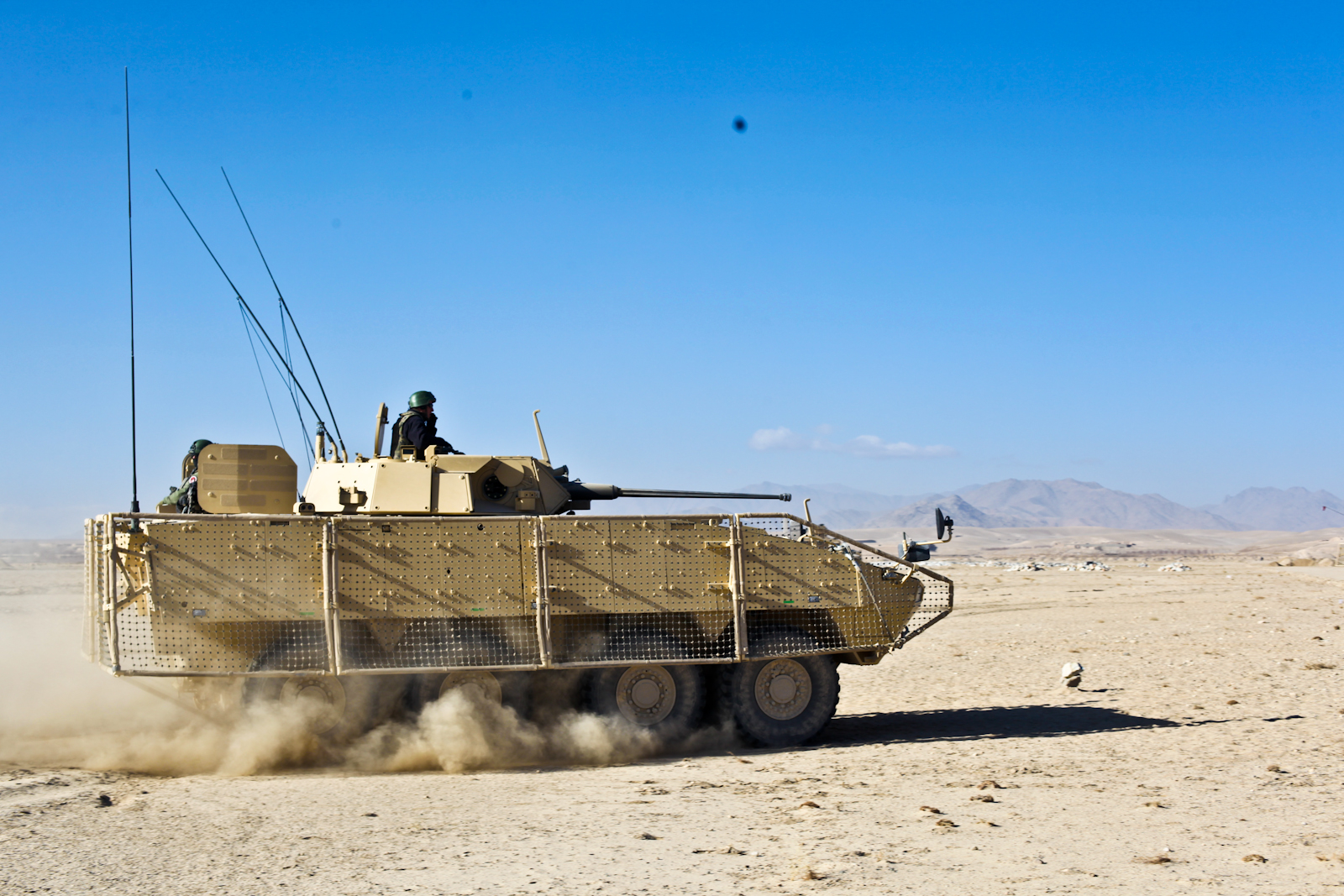
Rosomak-M1M with QinetiQ RPGNet (licence variant)

== Design ==
The Q-Net is an armor system that stands off from the vehicle's hull and "catches" the RPG before it hits the outside of the vehicle itself, using metal nodes connecting the net to disrupt the fusing of the warhead. The Q-Net is similar to other add-on systems like slat armor cages, but with additional benefits of being cheaper and 50–60% lighter than slat, allowing it to be integrated on light vehicles that cannot support slat such as Humvees. Because it is lighter, it reduces power train stress and fuel consumption, while giving equal or greater protection than bar armor. It is fully modular with a hook-and-loop installation method, allowing the system to be configured to different platforms. The net gives 360-degree coverage and can even provide overhead protection.

== History ==
The Q-Net was first sent to combat in Afghanistan in 2010. When soldiers saw the armor system, they were skeptical and concerned about its effectiveness. On September 19, a vehicle patrol equipped with Q-Nets was ambushed. At less than 100 meters distance, insurgents fired a volley of RPG rounds, followed by machine gun fire and then another RPG. The soldiers moved forward of the ambush and repelled the attack. Following the firefight, they found that the vehicles had taken three direct hits from RPGs and had not penetrated. They detonated at the nets, stopping them from penetrating the armor. One soldier commented, "All of the soldiers whose vehicles were hit by RPGs are alive today and still in the fight."

Following initial combat performance, 7,500 kits were ordered and produced at a rate of 1,000 per month. In February 2011, the U.S. Army ordered 829 nets for use on the Navistar MaxxPro. In May 2012, QinetiQ received a contract for 420 more Q-Net kits. They have been used on Humvees, RG-31s, M-ATVs, and other armored vehicles. On 6 December 2013, QinetiQ North America was awarded an $18.3 million contract to provide Q-Nets to protect hundreds of M-ATVs.

=== Q-Net II ===
By September 2012, 11,000 Q-Net kits had been delivered. At the same time, QinetiQ unveiled an improved version, the Q-Net II. Upgrades included the probability of defeating a warhead being further increased and even more weight reductions. It gives improvements to survivability and platform performance.

== Users ==
- United States
- France
- Poland
- Croatia
