= Tupolev Tu-360 =

Type of aircraft

Tu-360

General information
- Type: Strategic bomber
- Manufacturer: Tupolev OKB
- Status: Cancelled
- Number built: 0

The Tupolev Tu-360 was a proposed hypersonic strategic bomber conceived by the Tupolev design bureau in the 1980s. It used most of the same technologies as the Tupolev Tu-2000.

== Design and development ==
The Tupolev OKB intended the Tu-360 as a potential replacement for the Tupolev Tu-160, like the Mach 4 Tupolev Tu-230. Although some sources refer to it as the Tupolev Tu-2000B, largely because it used the same liquid hydrogen ramjet engine technology as the Tu-2000, it was officially called Tu-360 in the project index. The Tu-360 had the same layout as the Tu-230, but was much larger and faster. Speeds at Mach 6 required the use of liquid hydrogen, and the weapons were to be housed in two bomb bays. Take-off weight was projected to be around 350,000 kg, with a weapons load at 10,000 kg. Tupolev planned to build a subscale technology demonstrator weighing 176,370 pounds (80,000 kg) to test the flight characteristics of the Tu-360, but a lack of funds following the fall of the Soviet Union meant that the project was axed in 1992.

== Specifications ==
Data from https://www.testpilot.ru/russia/tupolev/360/

General characteristics

- Crew: two
- Length: 100 m (328 ft 1 in)
- Wingspan: 40.7 m (133 ft 6 in)
- Wing area: 1,250 m^{2} (13,500 sq ft)
- Gross weight: 192,000 kg (423,288 lb)
- Max takeoff weight: 350,000 kg (771,618 lb)
- Powerplant: × Liquid hydrogen (LH2) Turbo jet/ramjet

Performance

- Maximum speed: Mach 6
- Range: 15,000 km (9,300 mi, 8,100 nmi)
- Service ceiling: 30,000 m (98,000 ft)

Armament
