= Foster-Miller =

American robotics manufacturer

Foster-Miller, Inc.
- Type: Private
- Founded: 1956
- Headquarters: Waltham, Massachusetts
- Products: Military Robotics
- Revenue: US$76,190,000 (2019)
- Parent: Qinetiq
- Subsidiaries: Foster-Miller Technologies
- Website: Foster Miller

Foster-Miller, Inc., a wholly owned subsidiary of QinetiQ, is an American-based military robotics manufacturer. Its two best-known products are its TALON robots and its LAST Armor.

Founded and based in Waltham, Massachusetts, it has offices in Albany, New York, Washington, D.C., and near Boston. Foster-Miller became a wholly owned Independent subsidiary of Qinetiq in 2004. Its parent has signed a special security agreement, allowing it to work independently in sensitive projects for US defense.

Foster-Miller has about 300 members of staff skilled in aeronautical engineering, administration, chemical engineering, chemistry, physics, civil engineering, electrical engineering, mathematics, statistics, mechanical engineering, metallurgy, polymers, polymerization, electromechanical engineering.

Foster-Miller works in the fields of robotics, advanced materials, sensors, custom machinery, medical device design, biopharmaceuticals, C4ISR and transportation. It has been awarded the aerospace quality management standard AS9100 (6 January 2006) and SW-CMM Level 3 software certification (9 February 2006) and ISO 13485 for medical device design and development.

== Mergers/acquisitions ==
On 8 September 2004 Foster-Miller was acquired by Qinetiq North America for $163 million US dollars. QinetiQ is an offshoot of the UK's DERA, which is Europe's largest science and technology company with a revenue of over $2.2 billion in the 2008 financial year. The acquisition was finalized on 9 November 2004, with Foster-Miller remaining an independent wholly owned subsidiary.

In August, 2005, Qinetiq bought Planning Systems Inc. Planning Systems Inc has some 350 employees with interest in diversified advanced technology.

On 23 April 2007 Foster-Miller announced the acquisition of two Pittsburgh-based robotics companies, Applied Perception Inc. and Automatika Inc. for up to $9.2 million US dollars each . Automatika provides design, system prototyping, and product manufacturing for robotic systems. Applied Perception creates standardized perception, planning, and control software for unmanned ground vehicles.

== History ==
Foster-Miller associates was founded by MIT graduate students Eugene Foster and Al Miller, but when Miller left MIT and Foster-Miller associates he was replaced by Charles Kojabashian and Edward Nahikian. The trio went on to keep the Foster-Miller Associates name and in 1956 formally opened Foster-Miller Associates in Waltham, Massachusetts.

It is difficult to find information relating to Foster-Miller's earliest years, but its recent performance is well documented and quite extensive. Some of the earliest developments were in jet spray dispensers in vending machines and Velcro/Raychem (heat-shrink tubing) molding machines. They developed ballistic nets in the 1990s and an overhead/underground power line monitoring system, and underground piping and nuclear steam generator maintenance robots ("guided mole").

- 1986: As part of the interagency program between NASA Lewis and the Oak Ridge National Laboratory, (ORNL), Foster-Miller was involved in the design of the R1000 free-piston Stirling engine hydraulic output system of the unit with assistance from Sunpower Inc., of Athens, Ohio.
- 1995: A computer model was created for crash testing rail equipment, this allows the company to recommend ways to improve railroad crash safety through improved designs. A 465 square meter locomotive testing facility was built in Fitchburg, Massachusetts. The facility was full scale and allowed testing of 40,000 pound (18,150 kg/18 ton) locomotives. When computer design/testing is complete and the designs are tested at their Fitchburg facility they are then tested at the Transportation Technology Center, Inc. (TTCI) locomotive testing facility at Pueblo, Colorado.
- 2001: NASA and Foster-Miller were in the process of creating a model called "integrated advanced dynamic finite element modeling" to improve aircraft seat designs during crashes. The model included the seat, its occupants, restraints, energy-absorbing materials. The model was being tested against existing designs to establish its ability to analyze designs.
- Mid-2003: 20 Foster-Miller TALON robots were brought into Iraq to be used in EOD/IOD roles. In March 2004 Foster-Miller was awarded two more contracts jointly worth around $6,000,000. The contract awarded by the Technical Support Working Group and the Joint Program Office for Robotics increased the number of TALONs in Iraq to 45 and includes providing spare parts. In September 2004 news is released of the creation of a TALON with chemical, gas, temperature, and radiation sensors. The contract was increased further to $27 Million (shipped November 5, 2004) and then on September 19, 2005, to $124 Million to produce 1200+ TALONs in their now multi-dimensional roles.
- 2003 September 8: They received a $25 million contract with the Naval Air Systems Command in Lakehurst, New Jersey to develop a robotic weapons loader for aircraft; the payment included developing the units and building facilities to provide them. The contract was in conjunction with MIT Field and Space Robotics Lab to create the model of the finished product and new designs for transmissions and electric motors to be able to do the jobs with little downtime.
- 2003 November 14: They received a contract to build composite components to be used in building F/A-18 E/F Super Hornet fighters and Unmanned Combat Air Vehicle (UCAV). The contract is to develop these new components in 5 years with funding of $4,200,000 US: "This award is a true product of government-industry collaboration, ... Under the guidance of NAVAIR engineers and our aerospace company partners, our composites team has brought forth technology which will enable an enormous reduction in labor and the number of manufacturing operations associated with the production of stiffening elements. This will enable faster production of composite stiffeners that are of consistent quality and durability, resulting in a significant cost reduction for the end product." said Jay Boyce, Senior Vice President of Foster-Miller.
- 2003 Q4: the Federal Railroad Administration (FRA) was trying to expand its abilities for crash testing locomotives and their fire safety standards. Foster-Miller was given a $9,000,000 US contract to perform testing at its facilities at Fitchburg. At the start of 2006, an additional $1.5 million from federal transportation appropriations funds is awarded. This was given for "Advanced Freight Locomotive Research" including advanced sensors, safety, and hazard research.
- 2003: Foster-Miller had a revenue of US$120 million.
- 2004: Foster-Miller was working on the Stingray boat trapping net, the net carried by a helicopter would be carried over its target and dropped. The target vessel would then be entangled in the falling net damaging the boat's motor(s). The net was originally in development for the United States Coast Guard. In May however they were awarded a contract to work with Metal Storm to design and develop ship-based defenses to counteract sea-skimming cruise missiles, small fast attack suicide bombing boats. The system, termed "Thunder and Lightning", uses Metal Storms concentrated bullet weapons fire ("thunder") with Foster-Millers Stingray incapacitating nets ("lightning").
- 2004 January: A section of Foster-Miller called LAST Armor worked with Sioux Manufacturing, and Velcro USA, Inc. to manufacture a ceramic door armor for the US Marines. This armor was designed for Humvees to protect against IEDs and small arms. The armor, when damaged, could be detached from the proprietary Velcro hook fastener system and using the tools included in the repair pack would allow new panels to be easily attached. This means that soldiers in the field do not need any tools, cutting, welding, and drilling to repair their vehicles.
- 2004 May: NASA awarded Foster-Miller with the Turning Goals into Reality award an award for "the most significant accomplishments in FY 2003 contributing towards NASA’s goals and objectives in aerospace technology.". Foster-Miller gained the award for its proprietary development of ultrasonic tape lamination (UTL(TM)). Using this method in conjunction with Northrop Grumman, Alliant Tech Systems (ATK), NASA Langley Research Center, and NASA Marshall Space Flight Center they created a composite cryotank. The ultrasonic technique allows composite parts to be manufactured that are equal to autoclaving components, which is expensive for large parts. Foster-Miller believes that this technique will be instrumental in the development of composite fuel tanks for NASA's next generation of reusable launch vehicle (RLV).
- 2004 October: In conjunction with Carbon Nanotechnologies, Inc. the company produces a new generation of aircraft sealants based on Single Wall Nanotube (SWNT) technology. This contract on October 26, 2004, was worth $3,960,000 and was awarded by the Office of Naval Research in Washington, D.C.

== See also ==
- Foster-Miller TALON
- Dragon Runner
