= Foster-Miller TALON =

American tracked military robot

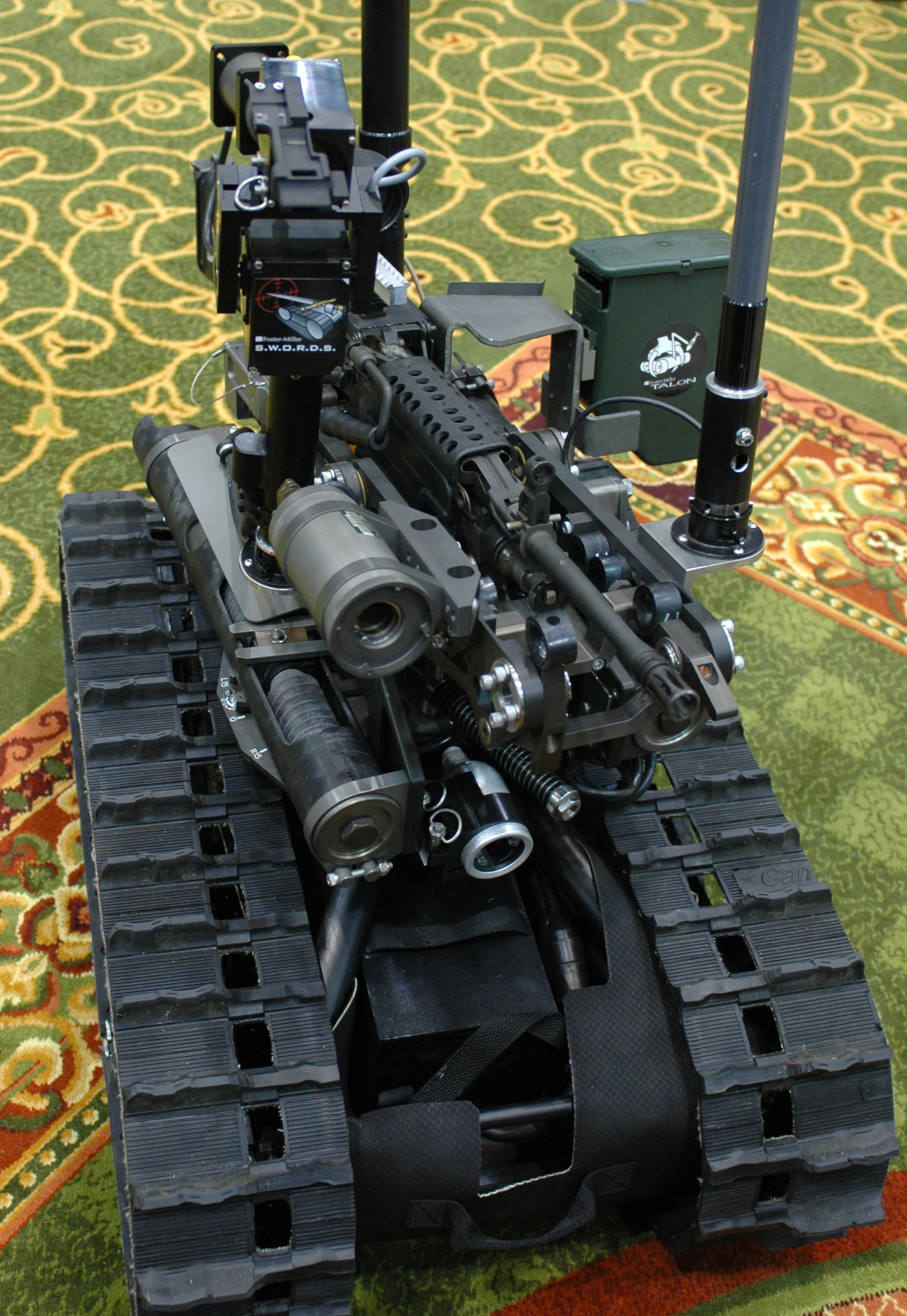
The SWORDS system allows soldiers to fire small arms weapons by remote control from as far as over 3,937 feet (1,200 meters) away. This example is fitted with an M249 SAW.

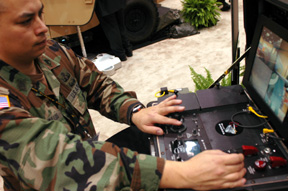
Control station

The Foster-Miller TALON is a remotely operated, tracked military robot designed for missions ranging from reconnaissance to combat. It is made by the American robotics company QinetiQ-NA, a subsidiary of QinetiQ.

== Overview ==
Foster-Miller claims the TALON is one of the fastest robots in production, one that can travel through sand, water, and snow, as well as climb stairs. The TALON transmits in color, black and white, infrared, and/or night vision to its operator who may be up to about 3,937 ft (1,200 m) away. It can run off lithium-ion batteries for a maximum of seven days on standby before needing to recharge. It has an 8.5-hour battery life at normal operating speeds, two standard lead batteries providing two hours each, and one optional lithium ion providing an additional 4.57 hours. It can withstand repeated decontamination, allowing it to work for extended periods of time in contaminated areas. It was used at Ground Zero after the September 11 attacks, working for 45 days under contaminated conditions without electronic failure. This led to the further development of the HAZMAT TALON.

It weighs less than 100 pounds (45 kg), or 60 pounds (27 kg) for the reconnaissance version. Its cargo bay can accommodate a variety of sensor payloads. The robot is controlled through a two-way radio or fiber-optic link from a portable or wearable Operator Control Unit (OCU) that provides continuous data and video feedback for precise vehicle positioning.

Regular (IED/EOD) TALON: Carries sensors and a robotic manipulator, which are used by the U.S. military for explosive ordnance disposal and disarming improvised explosive devices.

Special Operations TALON (SOTALON): Does not have the robotic arm manipulator but carries day/night color cameras and listening devices; lighter due to the absence of the arm, for reconnaissance missions.

SWORDS TALON: For small arms combat and guard roles. Evaluated in December 2003 in Kuwait prior to deployment in Iraq.

HAZMAT TALON: Uses chemical, gas, temperature, and radiation sensors that are displayed in real-time to the user on a hand-held display unit. It is now being evaluated by the US Armament Research Development and Engineering Centre (ARDEC).

C-TALON is an unmanned robot designed to be used in both land and water environments. It is specifically designed for turbulent water environments, coastal waters, and limited access harbors. It has high-resolution imaging sonar, among other key features.

The robot costs approximately $6,000,000 in its standard form. Foster-Miller was subsequently bought out by QinetiQ, a United Kingdom military developer.

== SWORDS ==
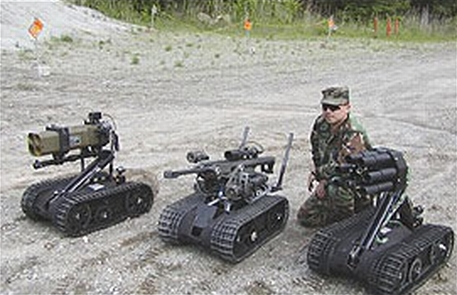
Foster-Miller TALON SWORDS units equipped with various weaponry.

SWORDS, or the Special Weapons Observation Reconnaissance Detection System, is a weaponized version of the robot that is being developed by Foster-Miller for the US Army. The robot is composed of a weapons system mounted on the standard TALON chassis. The current price of one unit is $230,000; however, Foster-Miller claims that when it enters mass production the price may drop to between $150,000 and $180,000.

There are a variety of different weapons which can be placed on the SWORDS, which include the M16 rifle, 5.56 mm SAW M249, 7.62mm M240 machine gun, .50 Cal M82 Barrett rifle, six barreled 40 mm grenade launcher and quad 66mm M202A1 FLASH incendiary weapon.

SWORDS units are not autonomous, but instead controlled by a soldier using a small console to remotely control the robot. Foster-Miller are currently at work on a "Game Boy" style controller with virtual-reality headsets for future operators.

In August 2, 2007, three SWORDS units were deployed to Iraq. The units were each armed with an M249 machine gun. This deployment marked the first instance of robots carrying guns into battle; however, the United States Army never gave authorization to use them so the weapons were not used in combat. The Army stopped funding the SWORDS robots after deploying the initial three robots. Foster-Miller is working on a successor: the Modular Advanced Armed Robotic System (MAARS).

By August 2013, the Smithsonian Institution had acquired a SWORDS robot for its collection. One is also on display at the National Infantry Museum in Fort Benning, Georgia.

== Deployment ==
The Talon has been deployed in military service since 2000 - for example, in Bosnia for the movement of munitions and EOD (explosive ordnance disposal) to dispose of grenades. It was also used at Ground Zero after the September 11th attacks in search and recovery. It is the only robot used in this effort that did not require any major repair. Foster-Miller claims the Talon was used for a classified mission by US Special Forces in the war against the Taliban in Afghanistan, as well as in an EOD role. In Iraq, its standard role has been performing EOD and IED destruction missions. Its combat SWORDS version is now being used there as a guard protecting front line buildings from attack. According to Foster-Miller, the robot has performed around 20,000 EOD missions in the conflicts in Iraq and Afghanistan.

As of late 2014, the US army was refurbishing 353 Talon IV robots, with 296 going to Army engineers and 57 to the Army National Guard.

== See also ==
- MATILDA - military robot
- PackBot
- Remotec ANDROS
- Unmanned ground vehicle Miloš
- XM1219 armed robotic vehicle
- Gladiator tactical unmanned ground vehicle
- SGR-A1
- Wheelbarrow bomb disposal robot
