= Defence Technology Centre =

UK military science research centre

A Defence Technology Centre carries out military science research on behalf of the UK government. They are consortia with members from industry, universities as well as QinetiQ. They are organised by scientific themes. There are currently four DTCs: Human Factors Integration; Electromagnetic Remote Sensing; Data and Information Fusion; Autonomous and Semi Autonomous Vehicles.
