= Rockwell X-30 =

NASA & DOD hypersonic project in 1986–1993

X-30 NASP
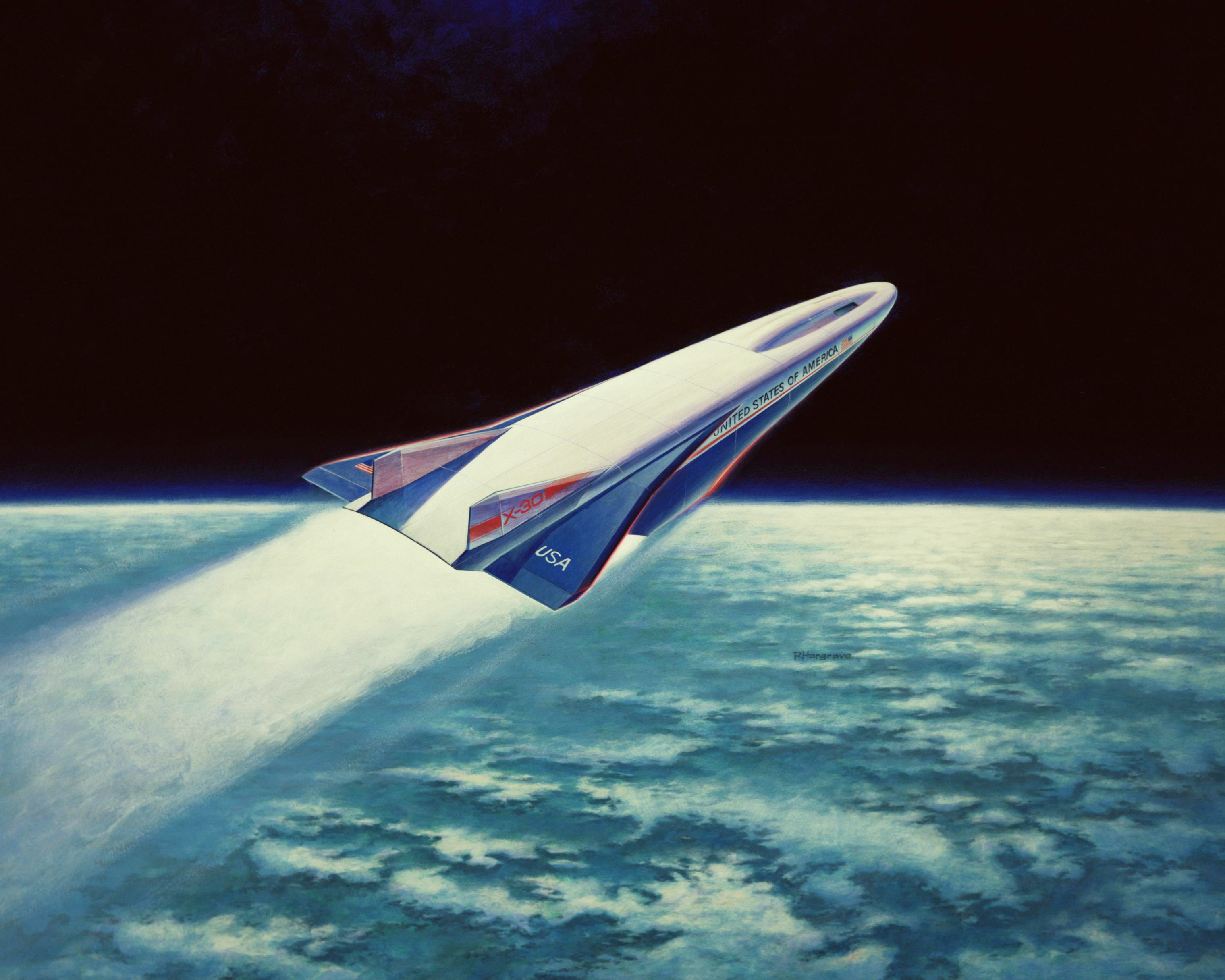
- An artist's concept of the X-30 entering orbit

General information
- Type: Single-stage-to-orbit (SSTO) spaceplane
- Manufacturer: Rockwell International
- Status: Cancelled in 1993
- Primary user: NASA

The Rockwell X-30 was an advanced technology demonstrator project for the National Aero-Space Plane (NASP), part of a United States project to create a single-stage-to-orbit (SSTO) spacecraft and passenger spaceliner. Started in 1986, it was cancelled in the early 1990s before a prototype was completed, although much development work in advanced materials and aerospace design was accomplished. While a goal of a future NASP was a passenger liner (the Orient Express) capable of two-hour flights from Washington to Tokyo, the X-30 was planned for a crew of two and oriented towards testing.

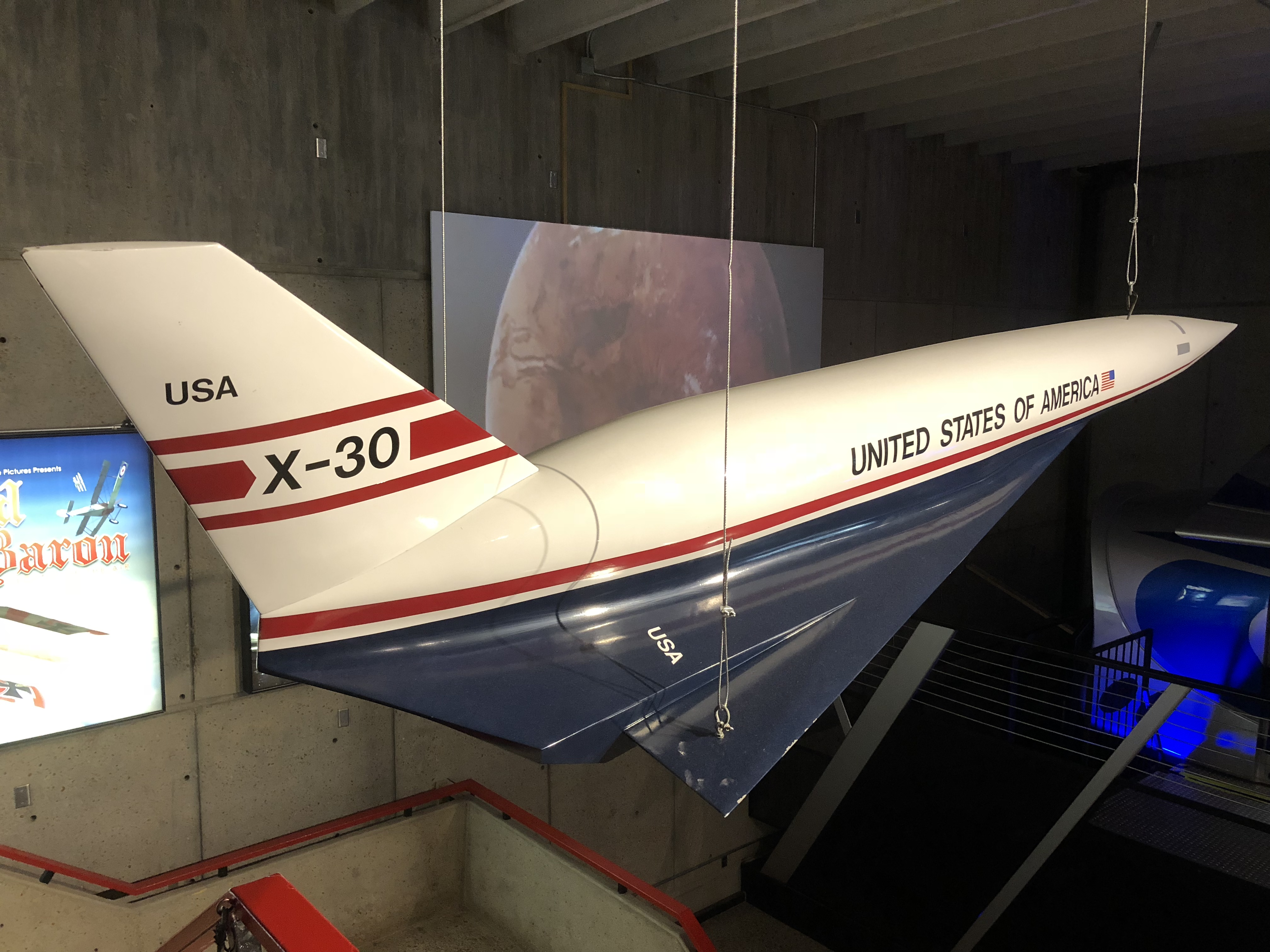
An older design model on display at the U.S. Space & Rocket Center in Huntsville, Alabama; note the conical nose and single-dorsal fin tail that distinguishes it from the newer model.

A newer design mockup on display at the Aviation Challenge campus of the U.S. Space & Rocket Center in Huntsville, Alabama; note the flat, duckbill nose and double-dorsal fin tail that distinguishes it from the older model.

== Development ==
The NASP concept is thought to have been derived from the "Copper Canyon" project of the Defense Advanced Research Projects Agency (DARPA), from 1982 to 1985. In his 1986 State of the Union Address, President Ronald Reagan called for "a new Orient Express that could, by the end of the next decade, take off from Dulles Airport, accelerate up to 25 times the speed of sound, attaining low earth orbit or flying to Tokyo within two hours".

Research suggested a maximum speed of Mach 8 for scramjet-based aircraft, as the vehicle would generate heat due to adiabatic compression, which would expend considerable energy. The project showed that much of this energy could be recovered by passing hydrogen over the skin and carrying the heat into the combustion chamber: Mach 20 then seemed possible. The result was a program funded by NASA, and the United States Department of Defense (funding was approximately equally divided among NASA, DARPA, the US Air Force, the Strategic Defense Initiative Office (SDIO) and the US Navy).

In April 1986, McDonnell Douglas, Rockwell International, and General Dynamics were awarded contracts (each no more than $35 M) to develop technology for a hypersonic air-breathing SSTO vehicle/airframe. Rocketdyne and Pratt & Whitney were each awarded contracts of $175 M to develop engines/propulsion. The airframe contractors would compete and two or three would be eliminated after a year. The plan was that 42 months later (end of 1989), contracts would be awarded to build the flight demonstrator vehicle.

In 1990, the companies joined under the direction of Rockwell International to develop the craft, to deal with the technical and budgetary obstacles. Development of the X-30, as it was then designated, began.

Despite progress in the necessary structural and propulsion technology, NASA had substantial problems to solve. The Department of Defense wanted it to carry a crew of two and a small payload. The demands of being a human-rated vehicle, with instrumentation, environmental control systems and safety equipment, made the X-30 larger, heavier, and more expensive than required for a technology demonstrator. The X-30 program was terminated amid budget cuts and technical concerns in 1993.

=== Legacy ===
A more modest hypersonic program culminated in the uncrewed X-43 "Hyper-X".

A detailed, one-third-scale (50-foot-long) mockup of the X-30 was built by engineering students at Mississippi State University's Raspet Flight Research Laboratory in Starkville, Mississippi. It is on display at the Aviation Challenge campus of the U.S. Space & Rocket Center in Huntsville, Alabama.

== Design ==
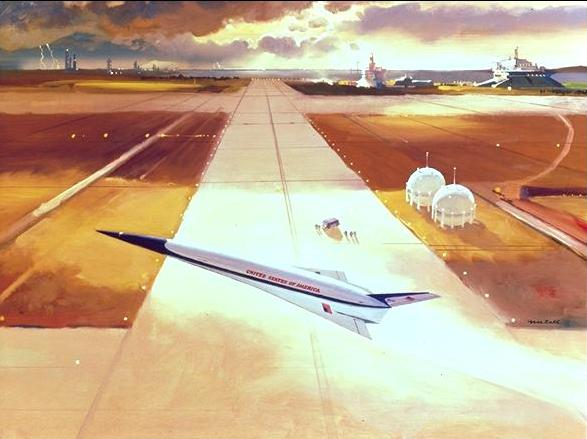
A 1986 artist's concept of the NASP on liftoff

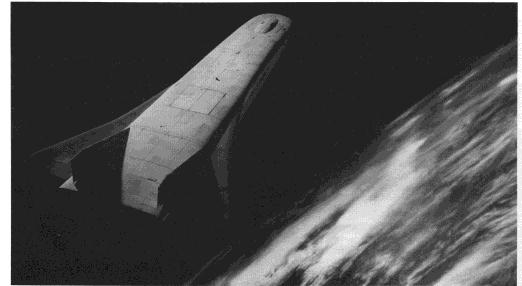
An artist's concept of the X-30 in orbit

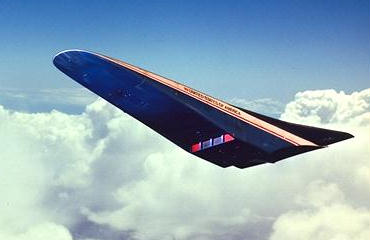
An artist's concept of the X-30 on re-entry

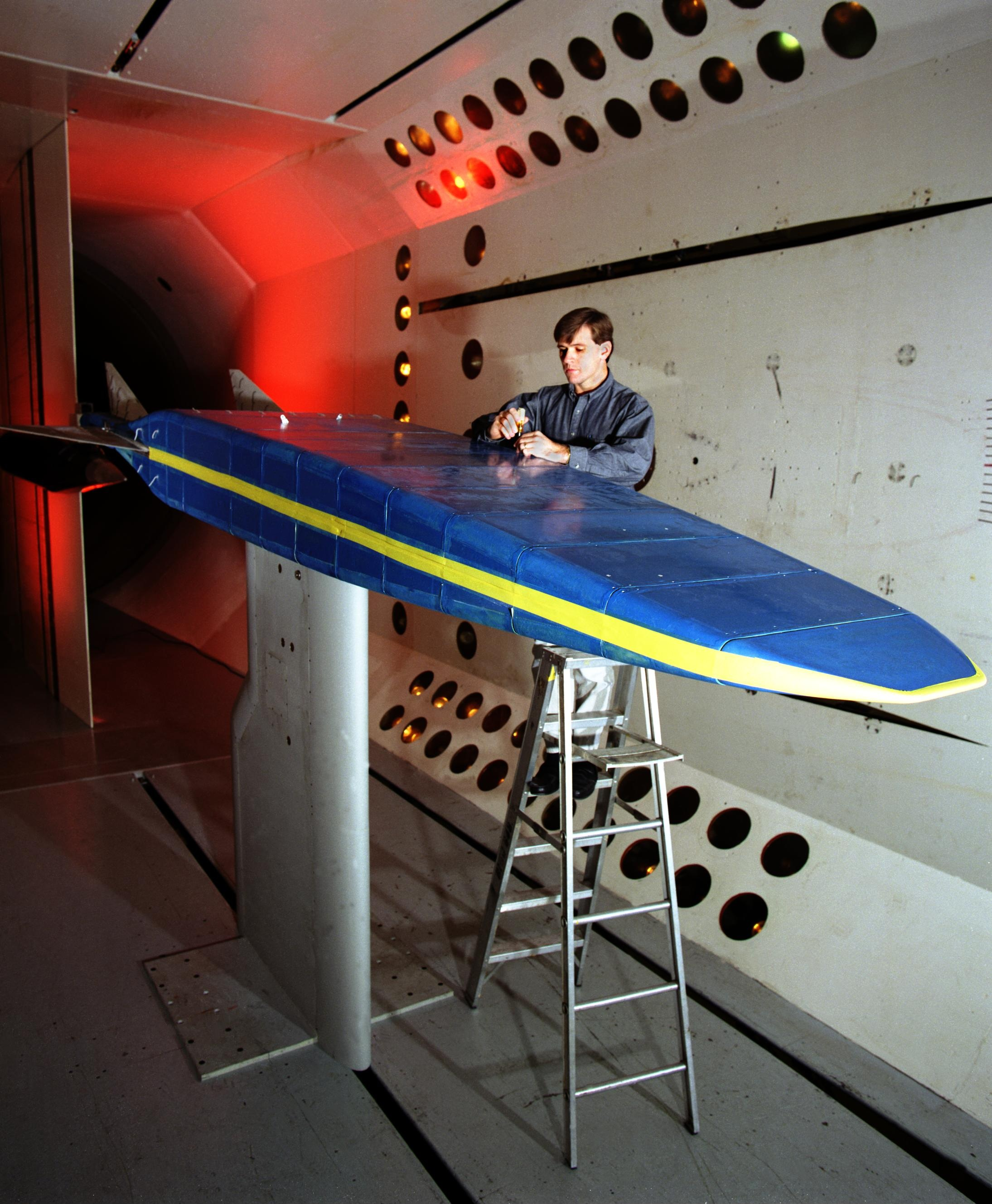
An X-30 model in a wind tunnel

The original concept was for a conical nose, this evolved (after 1987?) to a flat shovel shape.

The X-30 configuration integrated engine and fuselage. The shovel-shaped forward fuselage generated a shock wave to compress air before it entered the engine. The aft fuselage formed an integrated nozzle to expand the exhaust. The engine between was a scramjet. At the time, no scramjet engine was close to operational.

The aerodynamic configuration was an example of a waverider. Most of the lift was generated by the fuselage by compression lift. The "wings" were small fins providing trim and control. This configuration was efficient for high-speed flight, but would have made takeoff, landing and slow-speed flight difficult.

Temperatures on the airframe were expected to be 980 °C (1,800 °F) over a large part of the surface, with maxima of more than 1,650 °C (3,000 °F) on the leading edges and portions of the engine. This required the development of high temperature lightweight materials, including alloys of titanium and aluminum known as gamma and alpha titanium aluminide, advanced carbon/carbon composites, and titanium metal matrix composite (TMC) with silicon carbide fibers. Titanium matrix composites were used by McDonnell Douglas to create a representative fuselage section called "Task D". The Task D test article was four feet high by eight feet wide by eight feet long. A carbon/epoxy cryogenic hydrogen tank was integrated with the fuselage section and the whole assembly, including volatile and combustible hydrogen, was successfully tested with mechanical loads and a temperature of 820 °C (1,500 °F) in 1992, just before program cancellation.

== Specifications (X-30 as designed) ==
General characteristics

- Length: 160 ft 0 in (48.768 m)
- Wingspan: 74 ft 0 in (22.5552 m)
- Gross weight: 300,000 lb (136,077 kg)
- Powerplant: 1 × scramjet

Performance

- Propellants: air/slush LH2

== See also ==
- Scramjet

Aircraft of comparable role, configuration, and era

- NASA X-43 (essentially a scaled-down model)
- Tupolev Tu-2000
- HOTOL – UK spaceplane design of the 1980s
