= Digital Trust Center =

Cybercrime

Agency overview
- Formed: 2018
- Dissolved: 2026
- Superseding agency: National Cyber Security Center (NCSC-NL)
- Parent department: Ministry of Economic Affairs
- Website: digitaltrustcenter.nl

Overview of information security organizations of the government of the Netherlands

The Digital Trust Center was a Dutch government agency as part of the Ministry of Economic Affairs and Climate Policy (Dutch: Ministerie van Economische Zaken en Klimaat). It was supported by the Confederation of Netherlands Industry and Employers (VNO-NCW), the Royal Association MKB-Nederland), the National Coordinator for Security and Counterterrorism, the National Cyber Security Centre / Platform for the Information Society, Platform Netherlands, NLdigital, and the Dutch Chamber of Commerce.

On January 1 2026, the organization merged into the National Cyber Security Center (NCSC-NL).

== Target group ==
The Digital Trust Center's target group consists of 2.2 million companies: from freelancers to large companies. These are all companies in the Netherlands that do not belong to the so-called vital sectors, such as banks, telecom, energy and water companies. Companies in these vital sectors have the National Cyber Security Centre as a partner within the central government.

== Mission ==
The Dutch Trust Centers mission is to increase the resilience of businesses to cyber threats with a focus on two key tasks. Its first task is to provide businesses with reliable and independent information on digital vulnerabilities and concrete advice on the action they should take, by means of a digital platform and other facilities. Its second task is to foster cyber security alliances between businesses. Both tasks aim to help businesses improve their cyber security arrangements and to increase their resilience to cyber threats.
