= Qinetiq =

British multinational defence technology company

QinetiQ Group plc
- Type: Public limited company
- Traded as: LSE: QQ.; FTSE 250 component
- ISIN: GB00B0WMWD03
- Industry: Aerospace; Defence; Research and development
- Predecessor: Defence Evaluation and Research Agency
- Founded: 1 July 2001; 25 years ago
- Headquarters: Cody Technology Park, Farnborough, Hampshire, United Kingdom
- Key people: Neil Johnson (chairman); Steve Wadey (CEO)
- Products: Defence, security, aviation, and energy and environment
- Revenue: ▼£1,922.6 million (2026)
- Operating income: ▲£247.2 million (2026)
- Net income: ▲£107.5 million (2026)
- Total assets: ▼£1,738.4 million (2026)
- Total equity: ▼£553.0 million (2026)
- Number of employees: 8,000 (2026)
- Website: qinetiq.com

QinetiQ (/kɪˈnɛtɪk/ as in kinetic) is a British defence technology company headquartered in Farnborough, Hampshire. It operates primarily in the defence, security and critical national infrastructure markets and runs testing and evaluation capabilities for air, land, sea and target systems.

As a private entity, QinetiQ was created in July 2001; prior to this its assets had been part of the Defence Evaluation and Research Agency (DERA), a now-defunct British government organisation. While a large portion of DERA's assets, sites, and employees were transferred to QinetiQ, other elements were incorporated into the Defence Science and Technology Laboratory (DSTL), which remains in government ownership. Some former DERA locations have thus become key sites for QinetiQ. These include Farnborough, Hampshire; MoD Boscombe Down, Wiltshire; and Malvern, Worcestershire.

In February 2006, QinetiQ was floated on the London Stock Exchange. The privatisation process was subject to an inquiry by the UK's National Audit Office, which was critical of the generous incentive scheme available to the company's management. QinetiQ has completed numerous acquisitions of defence- and technology-related companies – mostly ones that are based in the United States – and is a trusted supplier to the US government. QinetiQ USA operates under a Special Security Arrangement which allows it to work independently and separately on some of the most sensitive United States defence programs despite its foreign ownership. It has also spun off some of its technologies into new companies, such as Omni-ID Ltd. It is currently a constituent of the FTSE 250 Index.

== Name ==
"QinetiQ" is an invented name. "Qi" is supposed to reflect the company's energy, "net" its networking ability, and "iq" its intellectual resources. The name was adopted in early 2001 as a marker of Defence Evaluation and Research Agency (DERA) privatisation; the rebranding reportedly cost £400,000.

== History ==
=== Creation and early years ===
In early 2001, defence minister Lewis Moonie announced the creation of QinetiQ via the privatisation of the Defence Evaluation and Research Agency (DERA). At the time, Moonie stated that the entity would remain a British business, being based in the UK, and that the Ministry of Defence (MoD) would retain a 'special share' in the company, while safeguards would be in place to prevent conflicts of interest.

By April 2002, while QinetiQ had taken steps to operate on a commercial basis and saw third parties as its key growth area, 80% of its annual sales was reportedly being derived from the UK MoD. It was observed that QinetiQ's close relationship with the MoD gave it a competitive edge over most private-sector rivals.

Initially, QinetiQ was entirely owned by the British government; from an early stage, it was planned for a flotation of the firm on the stock market to occur sometime during 2002. However, this flotation was postponed; according to aerospace industry periodical Flight International, a lack of investor confidence was the principal reason for the delay.

In late 2002, the American private equity firm the Carlyle Group publicly declared its intention to purchase a $263 million stake in QinetiQ. In February 2003, the Carlyle Group completed the acquisition of a 33.8 percent share for £42 million. Prior to QinetiQ's flotation years later, ownership of the firm was divided between the MoD (56 percent), Carlyle Group (31 percent) and individual staff members (13 percent). The Carlyle Group was expected to remain invested in QinetiQ for between three and five years, after which a floatation would take place.

In September 2004, QinetiQ acquired the US defence companies Westar Corporation and Foster-Miller, maker of the Talon robot. Also in 2004, it acquired HVR Consulting Services a leading UK-based engineering consultancy.

In early August 2005, the company announced it would acquire Apogen Technologies, Inc., pending regulatory approval; according to QinetiQ's website, the purchase came at a cost of $288.0m (£162.7m). In September 2005, the company acquired a 90% share of Verhaert Design and Development NV (VDD), a Belgian space systems integrator. In October that year, it acquired Broadreach Networks Limited, a supplier of Wi-Fi internet equipment to the European rail industry, and in February 2006, it bought Graphics Research Corporation Ltd, developer of the Paramarine software suite of ship and submarine design tools.

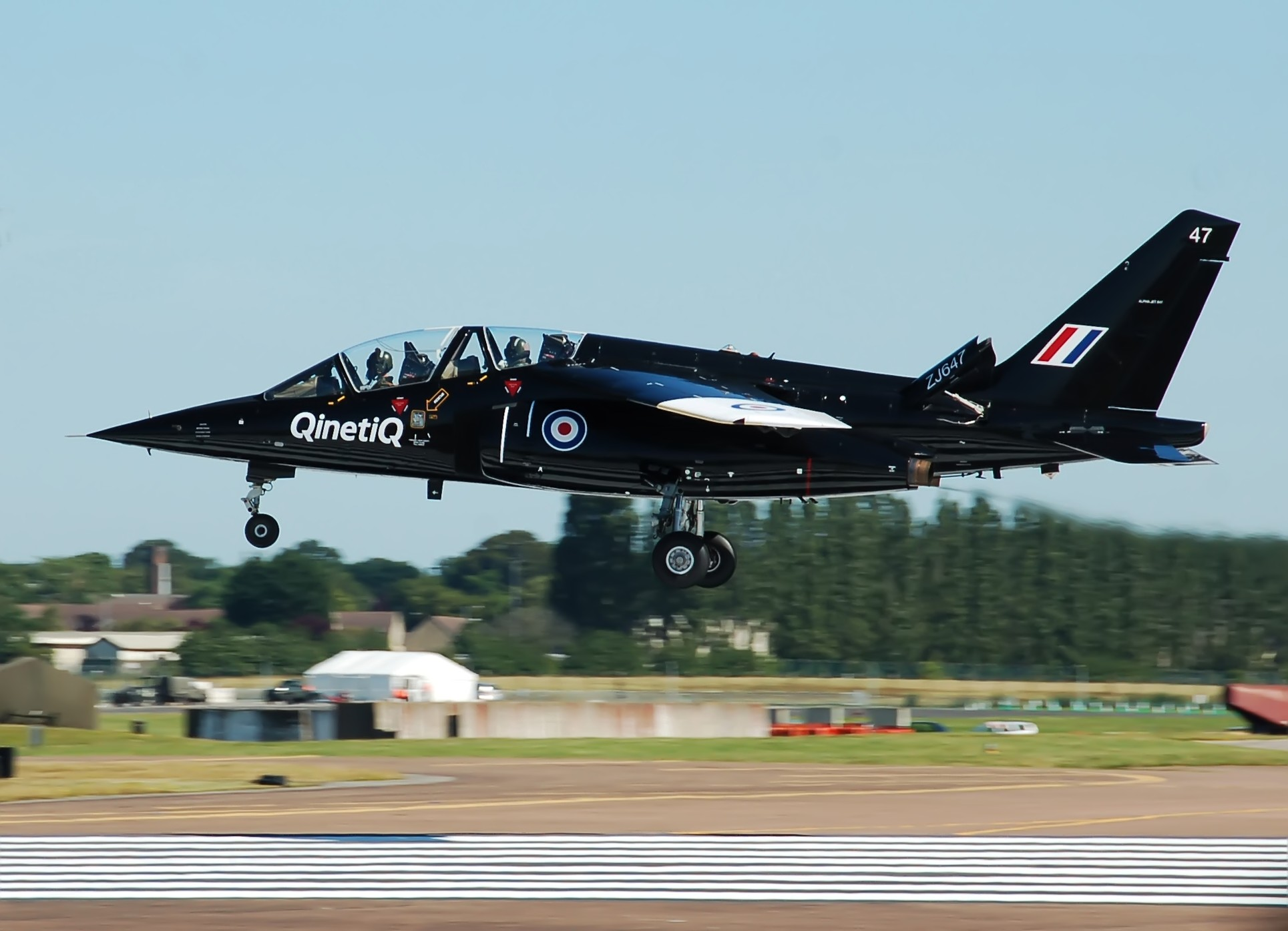
QinetiQ Dassault/Dornier Alpha Jet (ZJ647) arrives at RAF Fairford, Gloucestershire, England, for the Royal International Air Tattoo (2014)

=== Stock exchange listing ===
On 12 January 2006, an announcement was made in Parliament by John Reid, Secretary of State for Defence, regarding the pending floatation of QinetiQ. Reid stated that the Carlyle Group 'will continue to retain a significant stake in the company', and that the government would continue to hold a 'golden share' to protect the UK's security and defence interests. On 10 February 2006, QinetiQ was floated on the London Stock Exchange. The valuation of the company, and of how much taxpayers would benefit from QinetiQ's privatisation, was a subject of considerable debate and controversy.

The company had been valued at between £1.1bn and £1.3bn, with the MoD holding estimated to be worth £616m – £728m, the Carlyle Group's holding £341m – £403m, and staff/management's holding worth £143m – £169m. Controversy was generated by the very large returns generated for both the Carlyle Group and senior managers at the company; reportedly Sir John Chisholm is speculated to have benefitted by over £20 million alone. Lord Moonie, who handled the initial sale, stated in 2006 that the government's 31 per cent stake should not have been sold when equity markets were languishing in 2002. Moonie said that he had argued for the sale to be delayed, but was over-ruled by the Treasury, which had convinced the Ministry of Defence to go ahead.

Controversy also arose around the fact that retail investors were excluded from the initial public offering (IPO) due to QinetiQ's complexity and that institutional investors would require less complicated marketing and financing. This led to contrasts with the 'Sid' campaign for British Gas plc in 1986, where retail investors were encouraged to buy shares, with discounts and a large advertising campaign. The issue was partially resolved by allowing some brokerage firms to place orders in the IPO as part of a combined order, allowing the firm to purchase as though an institutional investor but on behalf of clients. While this did not result in a public campaign or retail investor discounts, it did allow many investors to purchase shares. Upon its floating on 10 February 2006, QinetiQ had an IPO of 200p per share, resulting in a market value of £1.3bn. On 13 February 2006, shares closed at 219.5p, valuing it at over £1.4bn.

Speculation that a consortium including QinetiQ was about to win a £10bn MoD training contract helped push their share price back above 190p in early November 2006. It was announced on 17 January 2007 that the QinetiQ-led Metrix consortium was the preferred bidder for package one of the MoD's Defence Training Rationalisation programme, worth approx £16bn.

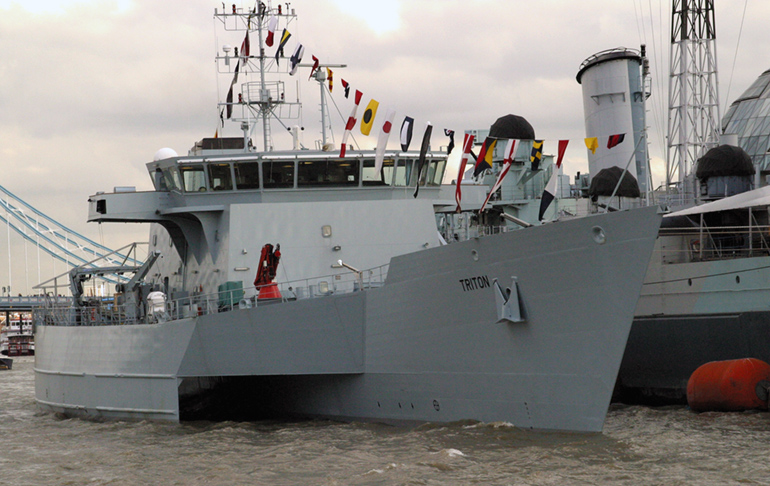
QinetiQ's experimental RV Triton

=== NAO inquiry ===
In 2007, the National Audit Office conducted an inquiry into the privatisation to determine whether UK taxpayers received good value for money. The inquiry looked at the following issues:

- the choice of privatisation strategy;
- management of the process (the split of the Defence Evaluation and Research Agency into two, the sale to Carlyle and the flotation);
- costs incurred and the proceeds achieved; and
- whether the deal met its objectives.

In November 2007, the NAO reported that taxpayers could have gained "tens of millions" more and was critical of the incentive scheme given to QinetiQ managers, the 10 most senior of whom gained £107.5 million on an investment of £540,000 in the company's shares. The return of 19,990% was described as "excessive" by the NAO. The role of QinetiQ's management in negotiating terms with the Carlyle Group while the private equity company was bidding for the business was also criticised by the NAO. Carlyle bought a third of the business for £42 million, which grew in value to £372 million in less than four years. However, the Ministry of Defence defended the sale:

"It has delivered excellent value for money, generating more than £800m for the taxpayer, while protecting UK defence and security interests," said Baroness Taylor, Minister for Defence Equipment and Support.

=== Expansion ===
In January 2007, the company bought Analex, a US corporation that provides high technology professional services, principally to the US government and its agencies. It was originally incorporated in 1964 under the name Biorad and evolved into Hadron, a US government systems consulting firm.

In February 2007, the acquisition of ITS Corporation, a provider of IT services to the US government and its agencies, was announced. The disposal of Aerospace Filtration Systems (formerly part of Westar) was announced at the same time. In June of that year, QinetiQ announced that Apogen Technologies Inc., its US subsidiary, had completed the acquisition of 3H Technology LLC, a specialist IT company with US government and commercial clients. In October, the company completed the acquisition of Boldon James Holdings Limited, a UK-based provider of software for high end secure messaging, primarily for military, government and security customers worldwide.

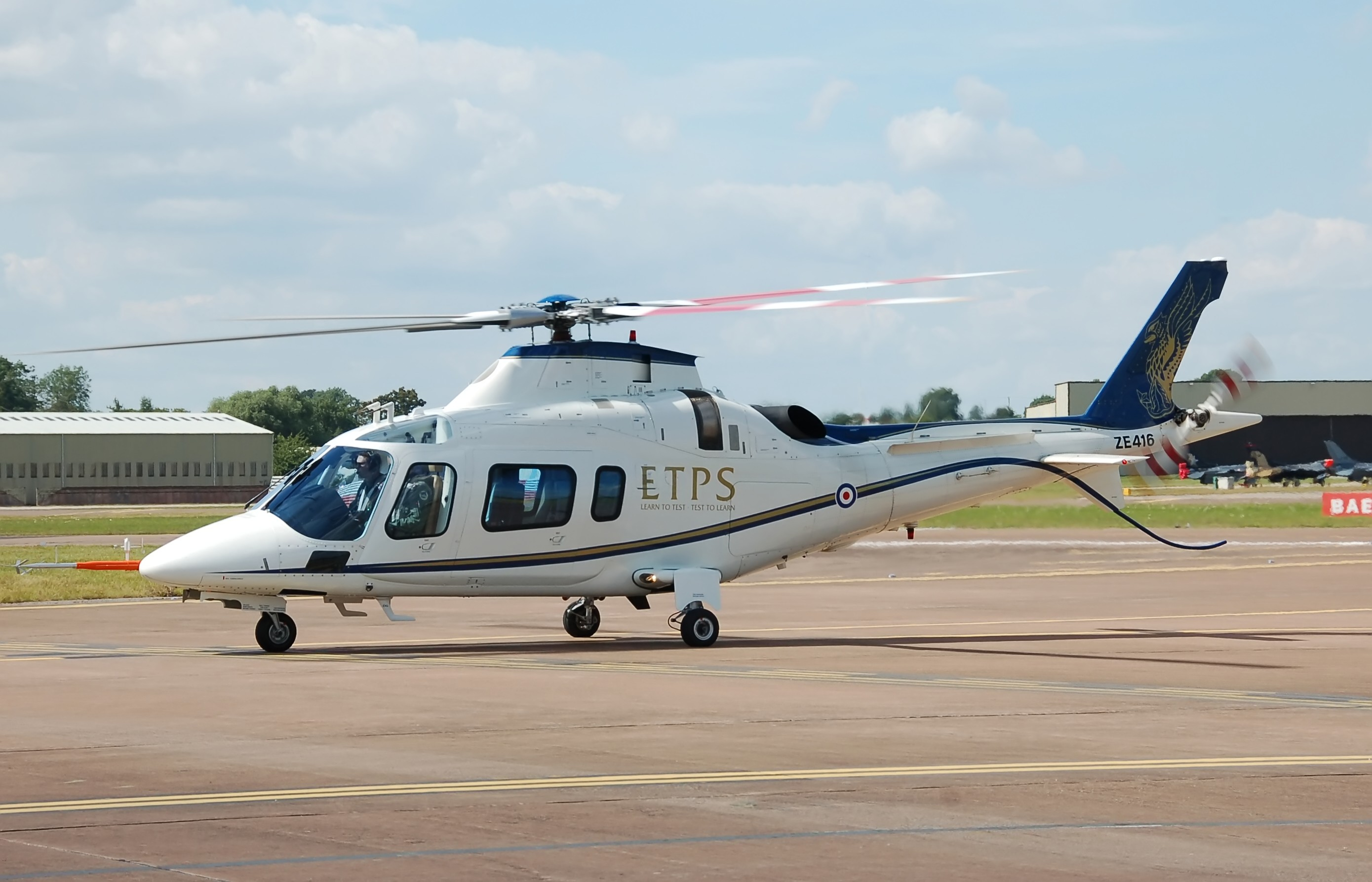
QinetiQ AgustaWestland AW109E Power arrives for the 2014 Royal International Air Tattoo, England

In March 2007, QinetiQ spun off a new company, Omni-ID Ltd; this entity specialises in the commercial opportunities for passive UHF radio-frequency identification (RFID) tags. Prior to the spin off, a research team at QinetiQ had been active since the 1990s to develop new and more effective RFID technologies.

On 9 February 2007, the Carlyle Group sold its remaining 10.3% stake in the group at 205p per share, resulting in a £290 million return on its original investment. During September 2008, the MoD sold its remaining 18.9% holding in QinetiQ at 206p per share, raising £254 million. The British government retained its 'special share', giving it control over any potential takeover. In February 2020, QinetiQ acquired military training specialist Newman & Spurr Consultancy Ltd for £14 million.

In November 2022, it was announced QinetiQ had completed the acquisition of the McLean-headquartered provider of cybersecurity and data analytics software to US government agencies, Avantus Federal for $590 million USD.

=== Cybersecurity ===
During mid-2013, reports emerged that Chinese hackers had allegedly compromised sensitive military research being performed by QinetiQ. It was claimed that, between 2007 and 2010, QinetiQ's North American business was the subject of a cyber-attack. At the time of the incidents, the company said it disclosed all of its breaches to the responsible government agencies and these were resolved to their satisfaction. The Pentagon has stated that it still entrusts QinetiQ with sensitive defence technology. The issue of cyber security affected other organisations; a Pentagon report stated that various US government agencies had been victims of cyber attacks.

QinetiQ provides auditing and consultancy services on cyber security to third party businesses. In 2011, the company announced the launch of a strategic collaboration with information security firm Nexor to pool their cyber security portfolios. During 2016, QinetiQ released a whitepaper on the topic, which identified employee behaviour as a major contributing factor in the majority of security breaches. QinetiQ has partnered with mobile phone network provider Vodafone to support end-to-end internet security services.

== Operations ==
QinetiQ provides technology-based products and services to numerous government and commercial customers. More than 2,000 of QinetiQ subsidiary Foster-Miller's Talon robots have been deployed to Iraq and Afghanistan, most used to remotely locate and disable roadside bombs. QinetiQ's SPO stand-off threat detection system has been sold to the US Transportation Security Administration for railway stations and airports.

During August 2008, QinetiQ's Zephyr, a solar powered unmanned aerial vehicle (UAV), performed a non-stop flight spanning 14 days; this was a world record for the longest duration unmanned flight. Over the following years, Qinetiq performed further record-breaking flights of the UAV. During summer 2018, an improved model of the Zephyr conducted an even-longer flight, lasting nearly 26 days. The Zephyr UAV has been offered as a commercial product, the programme having been acquired by multinational aerospace company Airbus Group. QinetiQ have been involved in the further development of the Zephyr, such as the provision of LIDAR payload for the type.

QinetiQ has a 25-year T3E (Test, Trials, Training and Evaluation) agreement formerly called the Long Term partnering Agreement (LTPA) with the UK Ministry of Defence (MoD) to provide test and evaluation services and manage military ranges. It is a major stakeholder in the UK Defence Technology Centre, which places military research contracts on behalf of the MoD.

QinetiQ has a 25-year Maritime Strategic Facilities Agreement (MSCA) with the MoD to provide strategic maritime facilities and capabilities, including hydromechanic facilities at Haslar, biomedical facilities on the UK's South Coast, and submarine structures, survivability and shock testing facilities at Rosyth.

=== Organisation ===
The QinetiQ Group comprises QinetiQ EMEA (Europe, Middle East and Africa) and QinetiQ North America. QinetiQ North America, which was set up after the takeover of Foster-Miller, is a wholly owned subsidiary of QinetiQ, but remains independent and separated from the QinetiQ group by a proxy agreement with the US to comply with US laws that prevent sensitive technology coming under the control of a foreign venture that takes over a US company. The major UK sites are at Farnborough, Hampshire (the historical Royal Aircraft Establishment) and Malvern, Worcestershire (the historical RSRE/RRE/TRE).

=== Workforce ===
QinetiQ is one of the ten largest UK employers of science and engineering graduates, recruiting around 150 per year. Between 2002 and 2006, it has appeared in the Times Top 100 Graduate Employers list.

During 2005, QinetiQ was accused by union officials of its employees exhibiting higher than average levels of stress-related depression, a finding that was strongly denied by the company.

On 25 March 2021, a worker was seriously injured at a QinetiQ-run Ministry of Defence facility in Pendine, Carmarthen.

== Services and products ==
The company's services and products include:

=== Defence ===
- LAST Armour
- Talon Robot
- ALARM radar (Alerter of Approaching Rocket Munitions)
- Family of Advanced Cost Estimating Tools (FACET)
- Operating and Support Cost Model (OSCAM)
- Q-Net, an armour attachment

=== Airships and balloons ===
- QinetiQ 1

=== Unmanned aircraft system ===
- QinetiQ Banshee (purchased from Meggitt in 2016)
- Qinetiq Mercator
- Zephyr (sold to Airbus in 2013)

=== Security ===
- Cyveillance (sold to LookingGlass Cyber Solutions in 2015, acquired by ZeroFox in 2020)
- Optasense – Distributed acoustic sensing
- X-Net

=== Aviation ===
- Acoustic testing
- Wind tunnel testing

== Notable staff and directors ==
- George Tenet, former Central Intelligence Agency Director, was an independent non-executive director between October 2006 and January 2008.
- David Sharp worked for the company as a mechanical engineer until 2005, when he resigned.
- Ben Wallace, later an MP and the UK Secretary of State for Defence, worked for the company from 2003 to 2005 as Overseas Director in the Security & Intelligence Division.

== See also ==
- Railgun
- Scramjet
- Aerogenerator
