= Velox boiler =

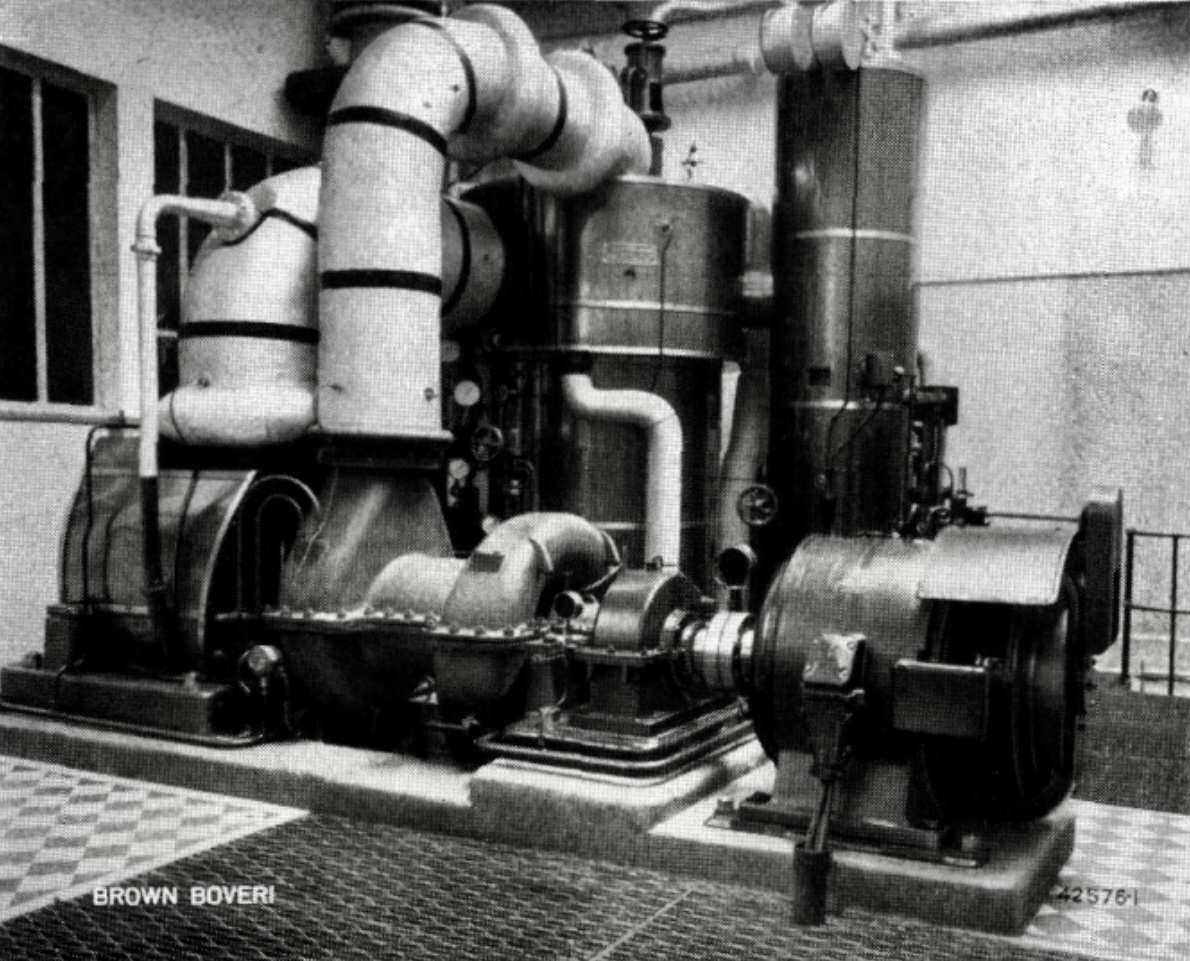
- Velox steam generator installed at Blin and Blin
- Classification: Turbo steam generator
- Application: Mostly used for electrical generation
- Fuel source: Fuel oil
- Components: Axial compressor; Combustion chamber; Flue gas turbine
- Inventor: Brown Boveri Company (BBC)
- Invented: 1931

A Velox boiler is a turbocharged, forced circulation, water-tube boiler which utilises an axial flow compressor and a gas turbine. Velox (Latin: "fast") boilers, also known as Velox steam generators, were developed in the early 1930s by the Brown Boveri Company (BBC) of Switzerland. Velox boilers were the first commercially available machines to make use of axial compressors and played a pivotal role in the later development of BBC’s industrial gas turbines.

== Design ==
=== Velox principle ===
From Brown Boveri Review

The Velox principle combines the use of combustion under pressure, with very high flue gas velocities and with a gas turbine, whereby the pressure in the combustion chamber, the high gas velocities and the pressure drop of the gases for production of work are created by means of a compressor driven by the gas turbine, the latter being actuated by the products of combustion.

The great significance of the Velox idea lies in the fact that by means of the increase in pressure and velocities the components are greatly reduced in size, and the processes are accelerated without impairing the efficiency.

== Working ==
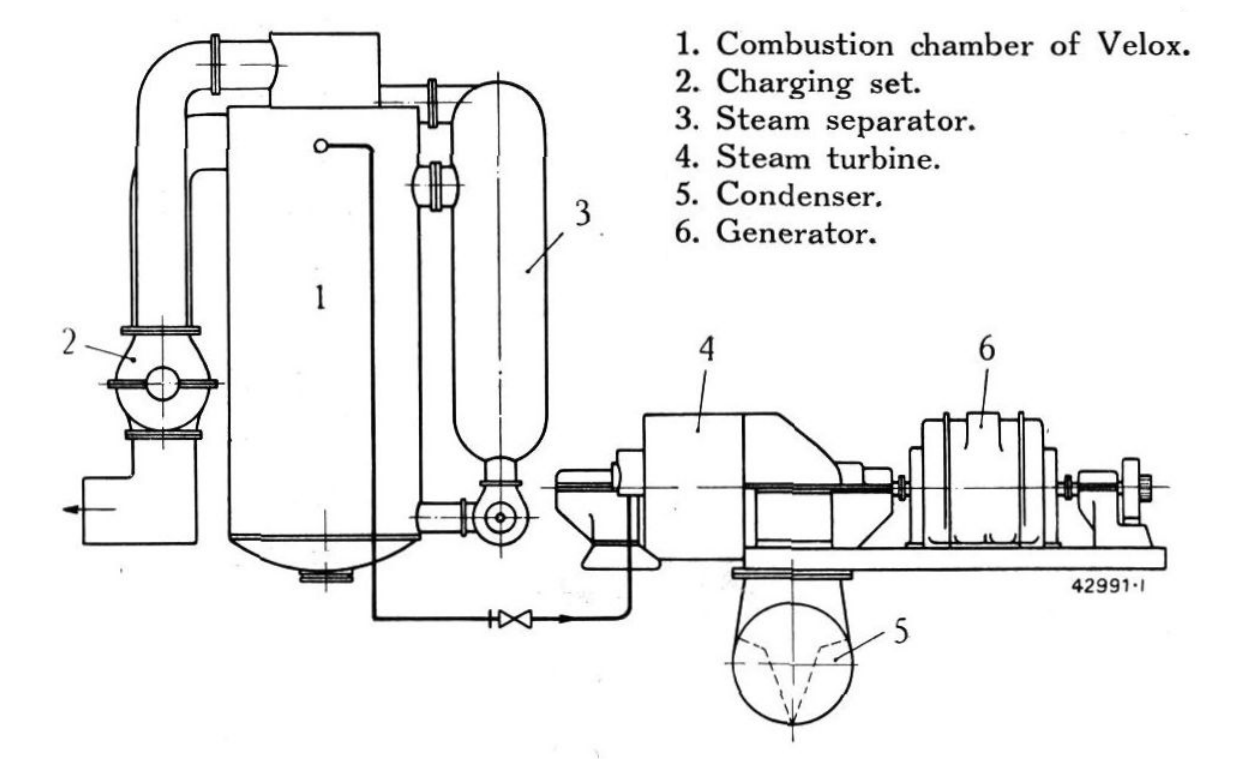
Diagram showing the main components of a quick-acting stand-by power plant with a Velox steam generator.

In a Velox steam generator used for electrical generation, flue gases from the combustion chamber are used to turn a gas turbine which is connected to a compressor which together make up the charging set. The compressor increases the flow of hot air which increases the rate of heat transfer to the water in the boiler tubes causing more steam to generate. The steam is used to turn a steam turbine which is coupled to an electrical generator.

The combustion chamber of the Velox could produce flue gasses by burning fuel gasses or heavy fuel oil. Blast furnace gas was typically used as fuel by Velox sets installed in steel mills. Efficiency of Velox steam generators was generally around 88—90% when burning blast furnace gas and 91—93% with fuel oil. Such efficiencies were maintained from 25—100% of load.

== History ==
Prior to World War I, BBC had worked on a number of experimental gas turbine projects addition to their commercially successful steam turbine business. BBC's gas turbine collaborations included those of Hans Holzwarth, Armengaud-Lemale and Auguste Rateau. BBC had also done experimental work on a two-stroke version of Herbert Humphrey’s Humphrey pump which would have been used for power generation (a so called "wet gas turbine"). None of these early gas turbine experiments produced a commercially viable product.

From 1928, BBC again collaborated with Hans Holzwarth on a two-stage constant volume explosion gas turbine. The performance of the Holzwarth turbines ultimately did not meet expectations with a major issue being the loss of heat through the water jacketing. It was recognised that the loss of heat into the water jacket could be turned into an advantage by using the heat in a turbocharged boiler. Based on these observations, and existing competencies with turbochargers and steam turbines, BBC developed a constant flow gas-turbine compressor set for use in steam turbines which became the Velox boiler.

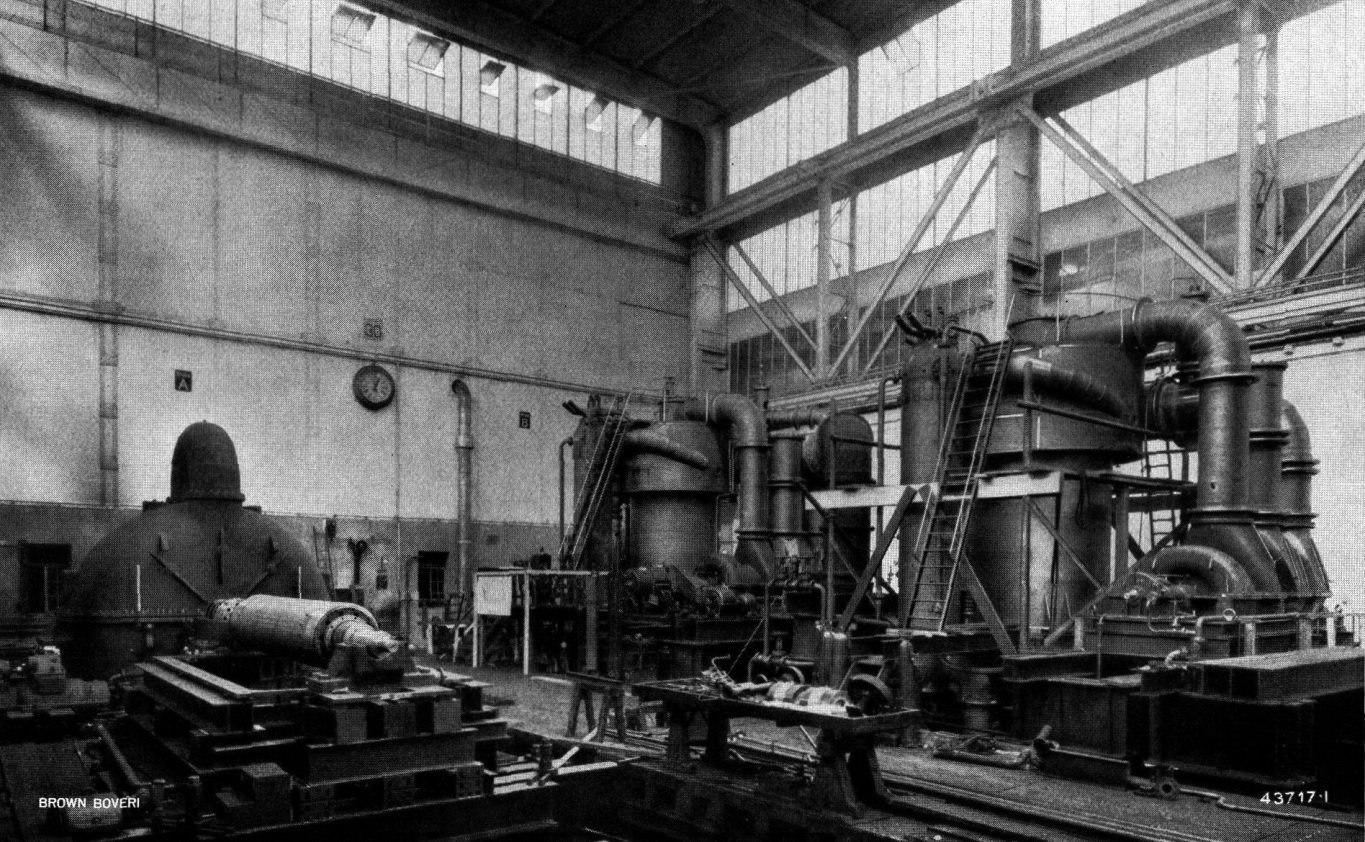
Two Velox steam generators on the test bed at BBC works in Baden, Switzerland

The first Velox boiler was exhibited at the VDI conference in Berlin during 1931. Orders quickly followed with the first being for the Mondeville steelworks in Normandy, France during 1932. A total of 110 Velox Boilers were built with 75 of these being ordered during the 1930s.

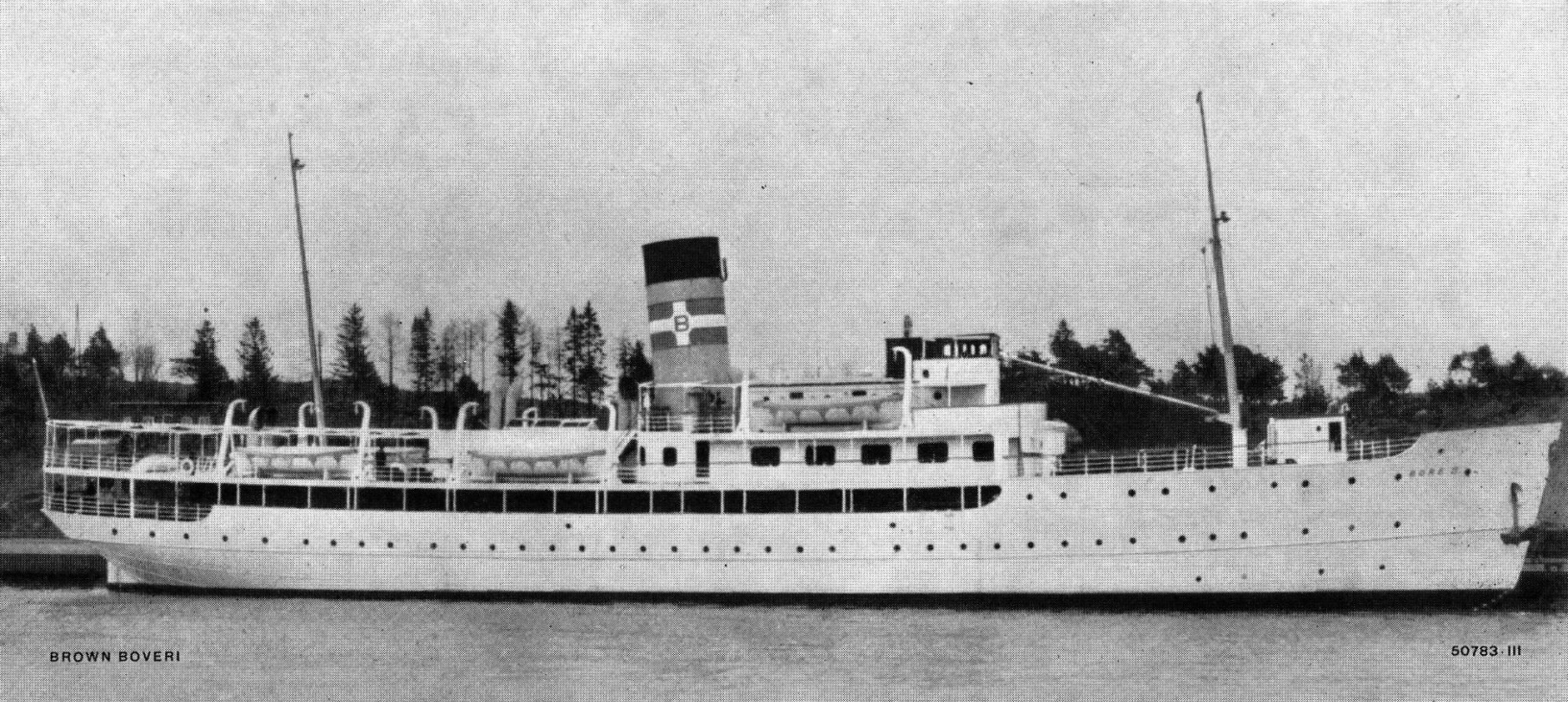
SS Bore II. The first vessel to be exclusively equipped with Velox boilers.

The vast majority of Velox boilers were used for electrical generation. In power stations Velox boilers were valued for their rapid starting times and compact size. Velox boilers were also built for ships and railway locomotives however they never found widespread use in these applications. In 1939, BBC delivered a single Velox boiler to the British Royal Aircraft Establishment in Farnborough for evaluation and testing.

Experiments with coal fuel were conducted by BBC in an attempt to increase sales of Velox boilers beyond customers with gaseous and liquid fuels. Pulverised coal, fed into the Velox combustion chamber by compressed air, was tried but caused excessive erosion on the gas turbine from flying ash particles.

The development of the Velox steam generator lead directly to the development of the first industrial gas turbines. In 1936, BBC built the world’s first constant flow industrial gas turbine for the Sun Oil refinery in Marcus Hook, Pennsylvania. The early BBC gas turbines were essentially Velox boilers with the steam component removed. The Marcus Hook compressor turbine set was used for the catalyst regeneration cycle of the Houndry oil refining process and included a 900 kW alternator coupled to the set's gas turbine. Experience with Houndry gas turbines lead to BBC’s development of the world's first gas turbine power station built at Neuchâtel, Switzerland.
