= Ægidius Elling =

Norwegian engineer and inventor

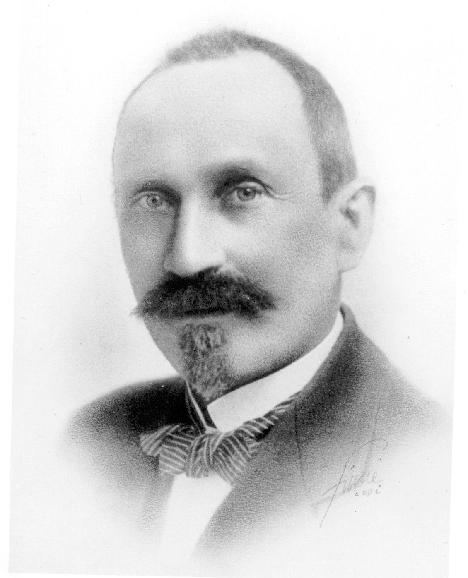
- Born: 26 July 1861
- Died: 27 May 1949 (aged 87)
- Engineering career
- Discipline: Mechanical
- Projects: First working gas turbine

Jens William Ægidius Elling (also Aegidus or Aegidius) was a Norwegian researcher, inventor and pioneer of gas turbines. In 1903, he built the first gas turbine capable of producing more power than required to drive its own components; however, his work remained largely unknown outside his native country during his own lifetime.

== Biography ==
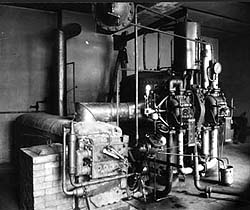
Gas turbine designed by Ægidius Elling (improved version of his 1903 patent), installed at Christiania Seildugsfabrikk

Elling was born and raised in Oslo, Norway. He studied mechanical engineering at Kristiania Technical College, (now part of Oslo and Akershus University College of Applied Sciences) graduating in 1881. Between 1885 and 1902, he worked as an engineer and designer at a number of workshops in Sweden and Norway.

Elling’s first gas turbine patent was granted in 1884. In 1903, he built the first gas turbine that produced excess power (i.e. more power than its own gas compressor consumed); his original machine used both rotary compressors and turbines to produce 11 bhp (8 kW; 11 PS) net. He further developed the concept, and by 1912 he had developed a gas turbine system with separate turbine unit and compressor in series, a combination that is now common. Elling continued to refine his gas turbine design adding water injection for compressor cooling and recuperation of exhaust gas heat. By 1932 his gas turbine was producing 75 bhp (56 kW; 76 PS). During the German occupation of Norway, Elling took steps to hide his gas turbine and research from the occupying forces.

One major challenge was to find materials that could withstand the high temperatures developed in the turbine to achieve high output powers. His 1903 turbine could withstand inlet temperatures up to 400 °C (752 °F). Elling understood that if better materials could be found, the gas turbine would be an ideal power source for airplanes.

Although Elling patented his gas turbine design, he remained in Norway and did not pursue development opportunities with major engineering firms in Europe or North America. As a result, his work was never commercialised, and went largely unnoticed until after the Second World War, by which time gas turbines and jet aircraft were already in widespread use. Notably, Brown, Boveri & Cie’s 1939 history of the gas turbine, issued the same year that the first industrial gas turbine went on public exhibition in Zurich, discusses the work of John Barber, Armengaud-Lemale, and Hans Holzwarth, but makes no reference to Elling’s pioneering research.

Elling also did research work in other areas, such as steam engine controls, pumps, compressors and vacuum drying. In 1914 Elling produced a book called Billig opvarmning: veiledning i at behandle magasinovner økonomisk og letvint. (English: Cheap Heating: Guidance for the simple and economical treatment of base burners), which was published by Aschehoug.

His gas turbine prototypes from 1903 and 1912 are exhibited at Norsk Teknisk Museum in Oslo.
