= Brayton cycle =

Thermodynamic cycle

The Brayton cycle, also known as the Joule cycle, is a thermodynamic cycle that describes the operation of certain heat engines that have air or some other gas as their working fluid. It is characterized by isentropic compression and expansion, and isobaric heat addition and rejection, though practical engines have adiabatic rather than isentropic steps.

The most common current application is in airbreathing jet engines and gas turbine engines.

The engine cycle is named after George Brayton (1830–1892), the American engineer, who developed the Brayton Ready Motor in 1872, using a piston compressor and piston expander. An engine using the cycle was originally proposed and patented by Englishman John Barber in 1791, using a reciprocating compressor and a turbine expander

There are two main types of Brayton cycles: closed and open. In a closed cycle, the working gas stays inside the engine. Heat is introduced with a heat exchanger or external combustion and expelled with a heat exchanger. With the open cycle, air from the atmosphere is drawn in, goes through three steps of the cycle, and is expelled again to the atmosphere. Open cycles allow for internal combustion. Although the cycle is open, it is conventionally assumed for the purposes of thermodynamic analysis that the exhaust gases are reused in the intake, enabling analysis as a closed cycle.

== History ==
In 1872, George Brayton applied for a patent for his "Ready Motor", a reciprocating heat engine operating on a gas power cycle. The engine was a two-stroke and produced power on every revolution. Brayton engines used a separate piston compressor and piston expander, with compressed air heated by internal fire as it entered the expander cylinder. The first versions of the Brayton engine were vapor engines which mixed fuel with air as it entered the compressor; town gas was used or a surface carburetor was also used for mobile operation . The fuel / air was contained in a reservoir / tank and then it was admitted to the expansion cylinder and burned. As the fuel/air mixture entered the expansion cylinder, it was ignited by a pilot flame. A screen was used to prevent the fire from entering or returning to the reservoir. In early versions of the engine, this screen sometimes failed and an explosion would occur. In 1874, Brayton solved the explosion problem by adding the fuel just prior to the expander cylinder. The engine now used heavier fuels such as kerosene and fuel oil. Ignition remained a pilot flame. Brayton produced and sold "Ready Motors" to perform a variety of tasks like water pumping, mill operation, running generators, and marine propulsion. The "Ready Motors" were produced from 1872 to sometime in the 1880s; several hundred such motors were likely produced during this time period. Brayton licensed the design to Simone in the UK. Many variations of the layout were used; some were single-acting and some were double-acting. Some had under walking beams; others had overhead walking beams. Both horizontal and vertical models were built. Sizes ranged from less than one to over 40 horsepower. Critics of the time claimed the engines ran smoothly and had a reasonable efficiency.

Brayton-cycle engines were some of the first internal combustion engines used for motive power. In 1875, John Holland used a Brayton engine to power the world's first self-propelled submarine (Holland boat #1). In 1879, a Brayton engine was used to power a second submarine, the Fenian Ram. John Philip Holland's submarines are preserved in the Paterson Museum in the Old Great Falls Historic District of Paterson, New Jersey.

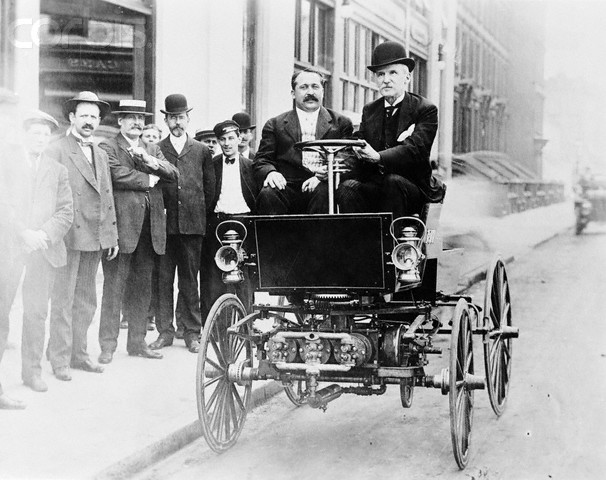
George B Selden driving a Brayton-powered automobile in 1905

In 1878, George B. Selden patented the first internal combustion automobile. Inspired by the internal combustion engine invented by Brayton displayed at the Centennial Exposition in Philadelphia in 1876, Selden patented a four-wheel car working on a smaller, lighter, multicylinder version. He then filed a series of amendments to his application which stretched out the legal process, resulting in a delay of 16 years before the patent was granted on November 5, 1895. In 1903, Selden sued Ford for patent infringement and Henry Ford fought the Selden patent until 1911. Selden had never actually produced a working car, so during the trial, two machines were constructed according to the patent drawings. Ford argued his cars used the four-stroke Alphonse Beau de Rochas cycle or Otto cycle and not the Brayton-cycle engine used in the Selden auto. Ford won the appeal of the original case.

In 1887, Brayton developed and patented a four-stroke direct-injection oil engine. The fuel system used a variable-quantity pump and liquid-fuel, high-pressure, spray-type injection. The liquid was forced through a spring-loaded, relief-type valve (injector) which caused the fuel to become divided into small droplets. Injection was timed to occur at or near the peak of the compression stroke. A platinum igniter provided the source of ignition. Brayton describes the invention as: “I have discovered that heavy oils can be mechanically converted into a finely divided condition within a firing portion of the cylinder, or in a communicating firing chamber.” Another part reads, “I have for the first time, so far as my knowledge extends, regulated speed by variably controlling the direct discharge of liquid fuel into the combustion chamber or cylinder into a finely divided condition highly favorable to immediate combustion.” This was likely the first engine to use a lean-burn system to regulate engine speed and output. In this manner, the engine fired on every power stroke and speed and output were controlled solely by the quantity of fuel injected.

In 1890, Brayton developed and patented a four-stroke, air-blast oil engine. The fuel system delivered a variable quantity of vaporized fuel to the center of the cylinder under pressure at or near the peak of the compression stroke. The ignition source was an igniter made from platinum wire. A variable-quantity injection pump provided the fuel to an injector where it was mixed with air as it entered the cylinder. A small crank-driven compressor provided the source for air. This engine also used the lean-burn system.

Rudolf Diesel originally proposed a very high compression, constant-temperature cycle where the heat of compression would exceed the heat of combustion, but after several years of experiments, he realized that the constant-temperature cycle would not work in a piston engine. Early Diesel engines use an air blast system which was pioneered by Brayton in 1890. Consequently, these early engines use the constant-pressure cycle.

Examples of Brayton engines

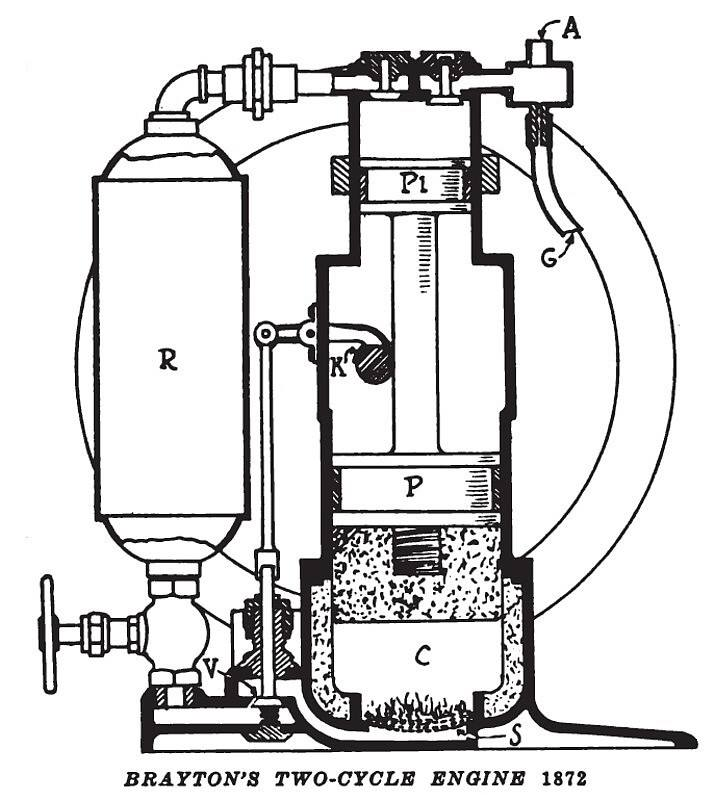
Brayton gas engine 1872

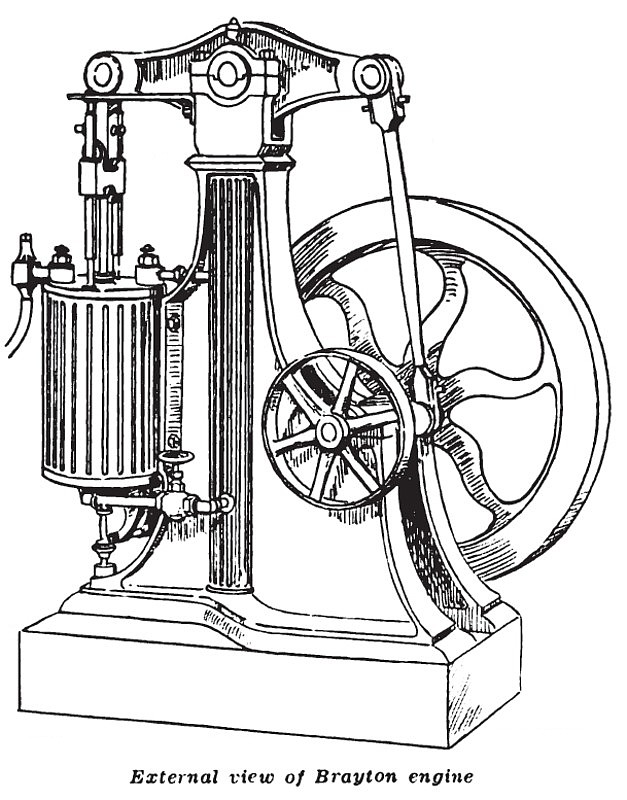
Brayton walking beam engine 1872

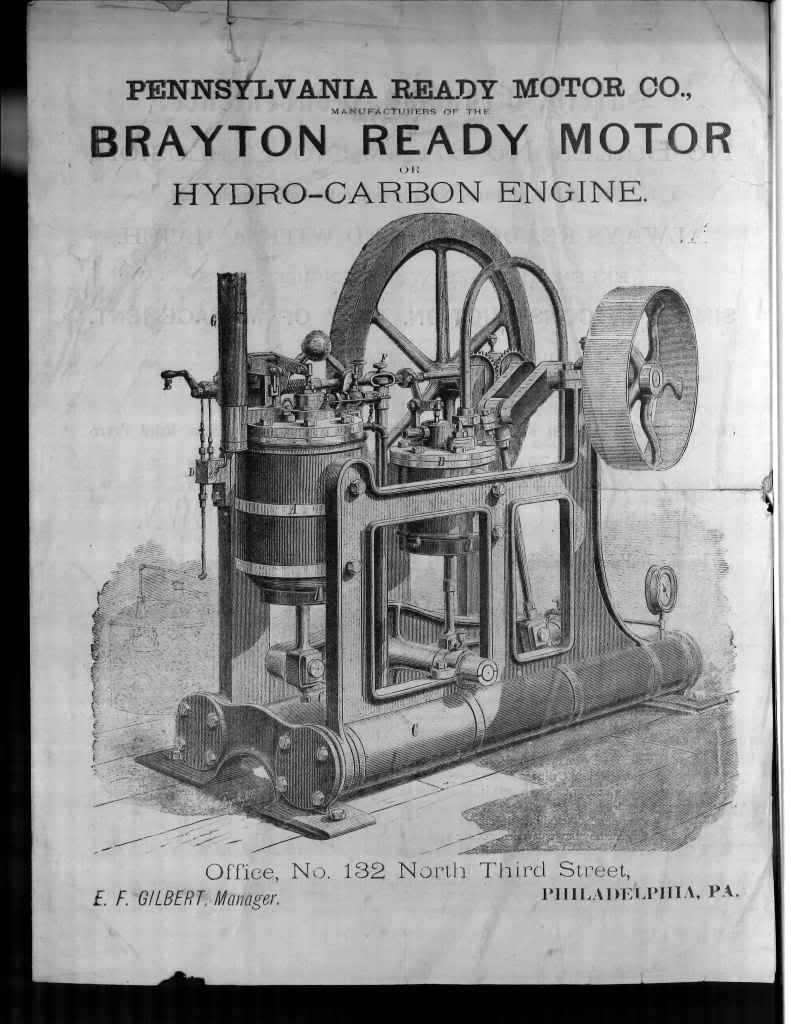
Brayton engine 1875

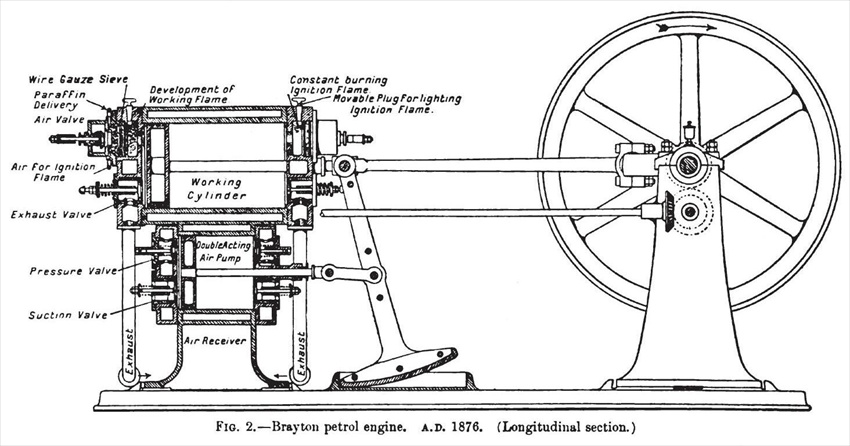
Brayton double-acting constant-pressure engine cut away 1877

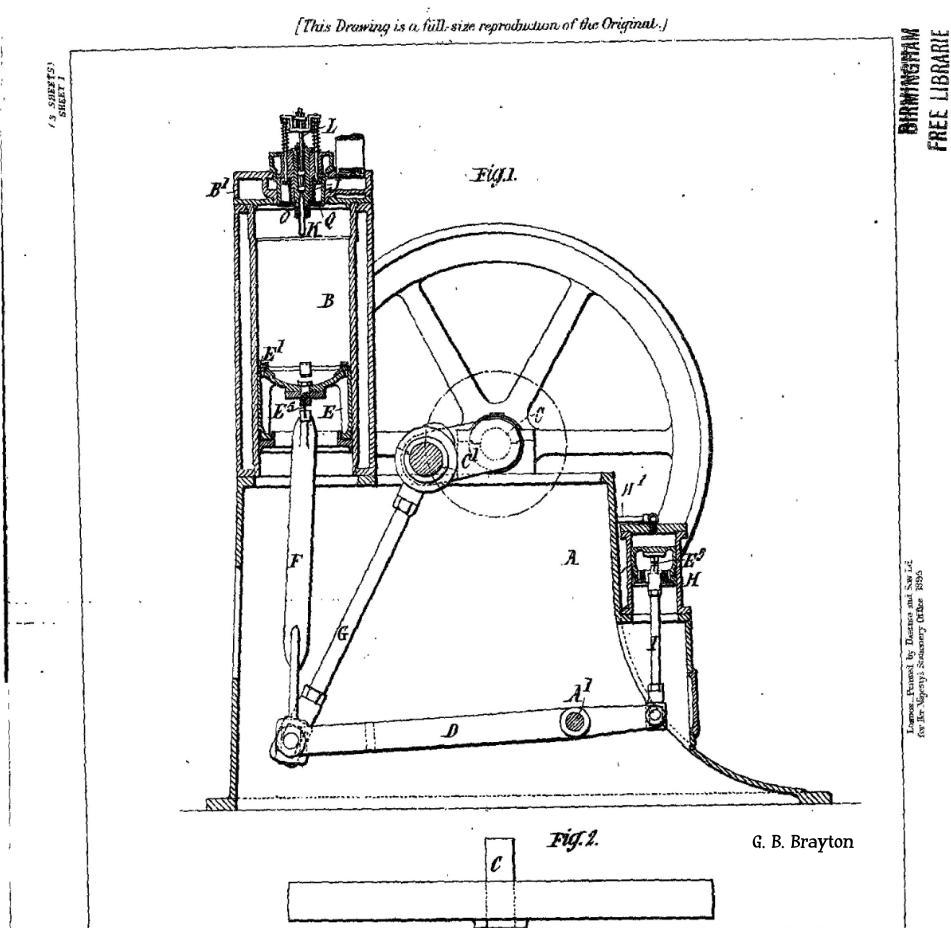
Brayton four-stroke air blast engine 1889

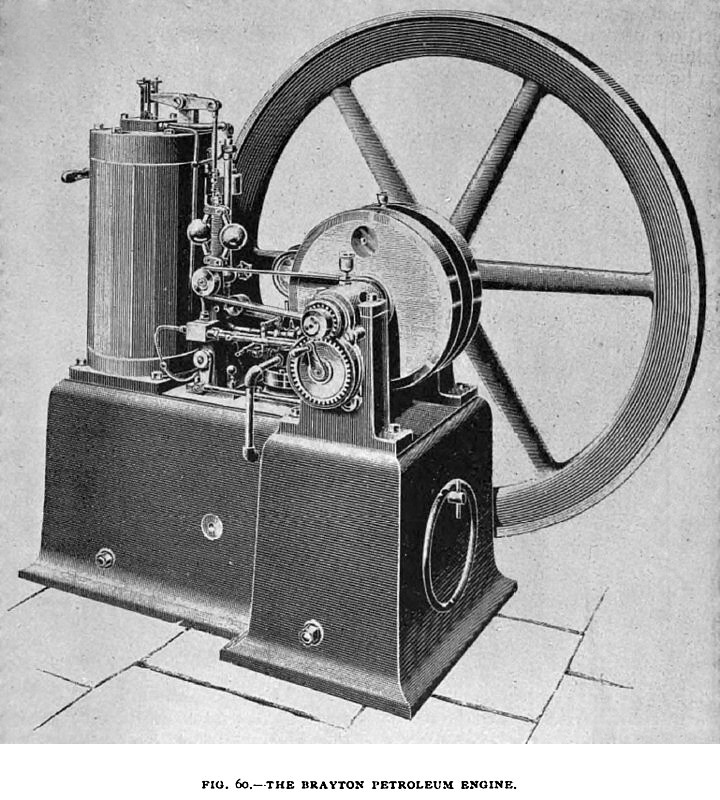
Brayton four-stroke air blast engine 1890

== Early gas turbine history ==
- 1791 First patent for a gas turbine (John Barber, United Kingdom)
- 1904 Unsuccessful gas turbine project by Franz Stolze in Berlin (first axial compressor)
- 1906 Armengaud-Lemale gas turbine in France (centrifugal compressor, no useful power)
- 1910 First gas turbine featuring intermittent combustion (Holzwarth 150 kW, constant volume combustion)
- 1923 First exhaust-gas turbocharger to increase the power of diesel engines
- 1939 Turbojet powered Heinkel He 178, world's first jet aircraft, makes first flight. World's first gas turbine for power generation by Brown-Boveri, Neuchâtel, Switzerland (velox burner, compressor and turbine flow by Stodola)

== Models ==
A Brayton-type engine consists of three components: a compressor, a mixing chamber, and an expander.

Modern Brayton engines are almost always a turbine type, although Brayton only made piston engines. In the original 19th-century Brayton engine, ambient air is drawn into a piston compressor, where it is compressed; ideally an isentropic process. The compressed air then passes through a mixing chamber where fuel is added, an isobaric process. The pressurized air and fuel mixture is then ignited in an expansion cylinder and energy is released, causing the heated air and combustion products to expand through a piston/cylinder, another ideally isentropic process. Some of the work extracted by the piston/cylinder is used to drive the compressor through a crankshaft arrangement.

Gas turbine engines are also Brayton engines, with three components: an air compressor, a combustion chamber, and a gas turbine.

Ideal Brayton cycle:

1. isentropic process – ambient air is drawn into the compressor, where it is pressurized.
2. isobaric process – the compressed air then passes through a combustion chamber, where fuel is burned, heating that air—a constant-pressure process, since the chamber is open to flow in and out.
3. isentropic process – the heated, pressurized air then gives up its energy, expanding through a turbine (or series of turbines). Some of the work extracted by the turbine is used to drive the compressor.
4. isobaric process – heat rejection (in the atmosphere).

Actual Brayton cycle:

1. adiabatic process – compression
2. isobaric process – heat addition
3. adiabatic process – expansion
4. isobaric process – heat rejection

The idealized Brayton cycle where P = pressure, v = volume, T = temperature, s = entropy, and q = the heat added to or rejected by the system.

Since neither the compression nor the expansion can be truly isentropic, losses through the compressor and the expander represent sources of inescapable working inefficiencies. In general, increasing the compression ratio is the most direct way to increase the overall power output of a Brayton system.

The efficiency of the ideal Brayton cycle is $\eta = 1 - \frac {T_1}{T_2} = 1 - \left(\frac{P_1}{P_2}\right)^{(\gamma-1)/\gamma}$, where $\gamma$ is the heat capacity ratio. Figure 1 indicates how the cycle efficiency changes with an increase in pressure ratio. Figure 2 indicates how the specific power output changes with an increase in the gas turbine inlet temperature for two different pressure ratio values.

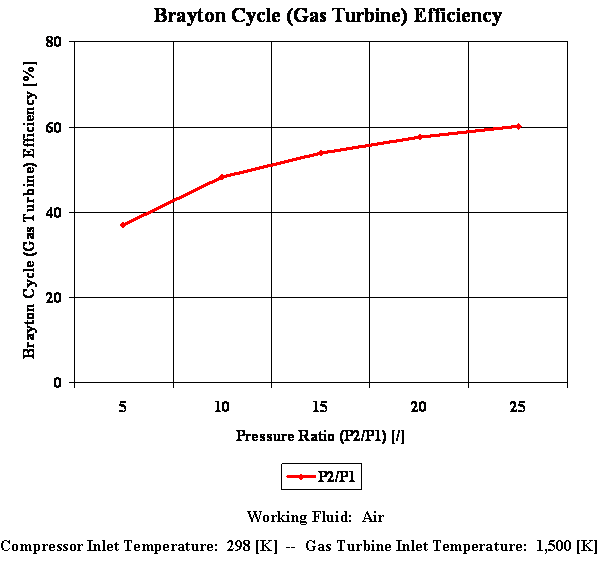
Figure 1: Brayton-cycle efficiency

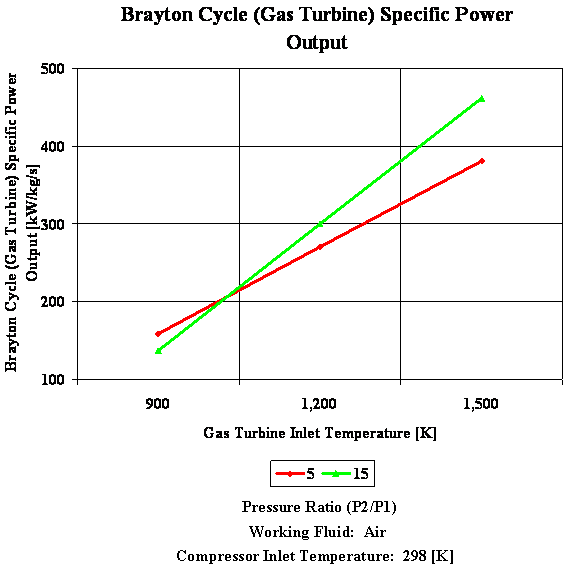
Figure 2: Brayton-cycle specific power output

The highest gas temperature in the cycle occurs where work transfer to the high pressure turbine (rotor inlet) takes place. This is lower than the highest gas temperature in the engine (combustion zone). The maximum cycle temperature is limited by the turbine materials and required turbine life. In most common designs, the pressure ratio of a gas turbine ranges from about 11 to 16.

== Methods to increase power ==
The power output of a Brayton engine can be improved by:

- Reheat, wherein the working fluid—in most cases air—expands through a series of turbines, then is passed through a second combustion chamber before expanding to ambient pressure through a final set of turbines, has the advantage of increasing the power output possible for a given compression ratio without exceeding any metallurgical constraints (typically about 1000 °C). The use of an afterburner for jet aircraft engines can also be referred to as "reheat"; it is a different process in that the reheated air is expanded through a thrust nozzle rather than a turbine. The metallurgical constraints are somewhat alleviated, enabling much higher reheat temperatures (about 2000 °C). Reheat is most often used to improve the specific power, and is usually associated with a drop in efficiency; this effect is especially pronounced in afterburners due to the extreme amounts of extra fuel used.
- In overspray, after the first compressor stage, water is injected into the compressor, thus increasing the mass-flow inside the compressor, increasing the turbine output power significantly and reducing compressor outlet temperatures. In the second compressor stage, the water is completely converted to a gas form, offering some intercooling via its latent heat of vaporization.

== Methods to improve efficiency ==
The efficiency of a Brayton engine can be improved by:

- Increasing pressure ratio, as Figure 1 above shows, increasing the pressure ratio increases the efficiency of the Brayton cycle. This is analogous to the increase of efficiency seen in the Otto cycle when the compression ratio is increased. However, practical limits occur when it comes to increasing the pressure ratio. First of all, increasing the pressure ratio increases the compressor discharge temperature. Since the turbine temperature has a limit determined by metallurgical and life constraints the allowable rise in temperature (fuel added) in the combustor becomes smaller. Also, because the length of the compressor blades becomes progressively smaller in the higher pressure stages a constant running gap, through the compressor, between the blade tips and the engine casing becomes a bigger percentage of the compressor blade height increasing air leakage past the tips. This causes a drop in compressor efficiency, and is most likely to occur in smaller gas turbines (since blades are inherently smaller to begin with). Finally, as can be seen in Figure 1, the efficiency levels off as pressure ratio increases. Hence, little gain is expected by increasing the pressure ratio further if it is already at a high level.
- Recuperator – If the Brayton cycle is run at a low pressure ratio and a high temperature increase in the combustion chamber, the exhaust gas (after the last turbine stage) might still be hotter than the compressed inlet gas (after the last compression stage but before the combustor). In that case, a heat exchanger can be used to transfer thermal energy from the exhaust to the already compressed gas, before it enters the combustion chamber. The thermal energy transferred is effectively reused, thus increasing efficiency. However, this form of heat recycling is only possible if the engine is run in a low-efficiency mode with low pressure ratio in the first place. Transferring heat from the outlet (after the last turbine) to the inlet (before the first compressor stage) would reduce efficiency, as hotter inlet air means more volume, thus more work for the compressor. For engines with liquid cryogenic fuels, namely hydrogen, it might be feasible, though, to use the fuel to cool the inlet air before compression to increase efficiency. This concept is extensively studied for the SABRE engine.
- A Brayton engine also forms half of the combined cycle system, which combines with a Rankine engine to further increase overall efficiency. However, although this increases overall efficiency, it does not actually increase the efficiency of the Brayton cycle itself.
- Cogeneration systems make use of the waste heat from Brayton engines, typically for hot water production or space heating

== Variants ==
=== Closed Brayton cycle ===
Closed Brayton cycle: C compressor and T turbine assembly; w high-temperature heat exchanger; ʍ low-temperature heat exchanger; ~ mechanical load, e.g. electric generator

A closed Brayton cycle recirculates the working fluid; the air expelled from the turbine is reintroduced into the compressor, this cycle uses a heat exchanger to heat the working fluid instead of an internal combustion chamber. The closed Brayton cycle is used, for example, in closed-cycle gas turbines for power generation in space.

=== Solar Brayton cycle ===
In 2002, a hybrid open solar Brayton cycle was operated for the first time consistently and effectively with relevant papers published, in the frame of the EU SOLGATE program. The air was heated from 570 to over 1000K into the combustor chamber. Further hybridization was achieved during the EU Solhyco project running a hybridized Brayton cycle with solar energy and biodiesel only. This technology was scaled up to 4.6 MW within the project Solugas located near Seville, where it is currently demonstrated at precommercial scale.

=== Reverse Brayton cycle ===
A Brayton cycle that is driven in reverse uses work to move heat. This makes it a form of gas refrigeration cycle. When air is the working fluid, it is known as the Bell Coleman cycle.

It is used in the LNG industry for cooling natural gas using power from a gas turbine to drive the compressor.

=== Inverted Brayton cycle ===
This is an open Brayton cycle which also generates work from heat, but with a different order of the stages. Incoming air is first heated at atmospheric pressure, and then passes through the turbine, generating work. The gas, now at a pressure lower than atmospheric, is cooled in a heat exchanger. The compressor raises the pressure again so the gas can be expelled to the atmosphere.

== Applications ==
NASA is considering the Brayton cycle for its lunar nuclear reactor to be launched in 2030.

== See also ==
- Britalus rotary engine
- Heat engine
- HVAC
- Rankine cycle
