= Neuchâtel gas turbine =

World's first electric power-generating gas turbine to go into commercial operation

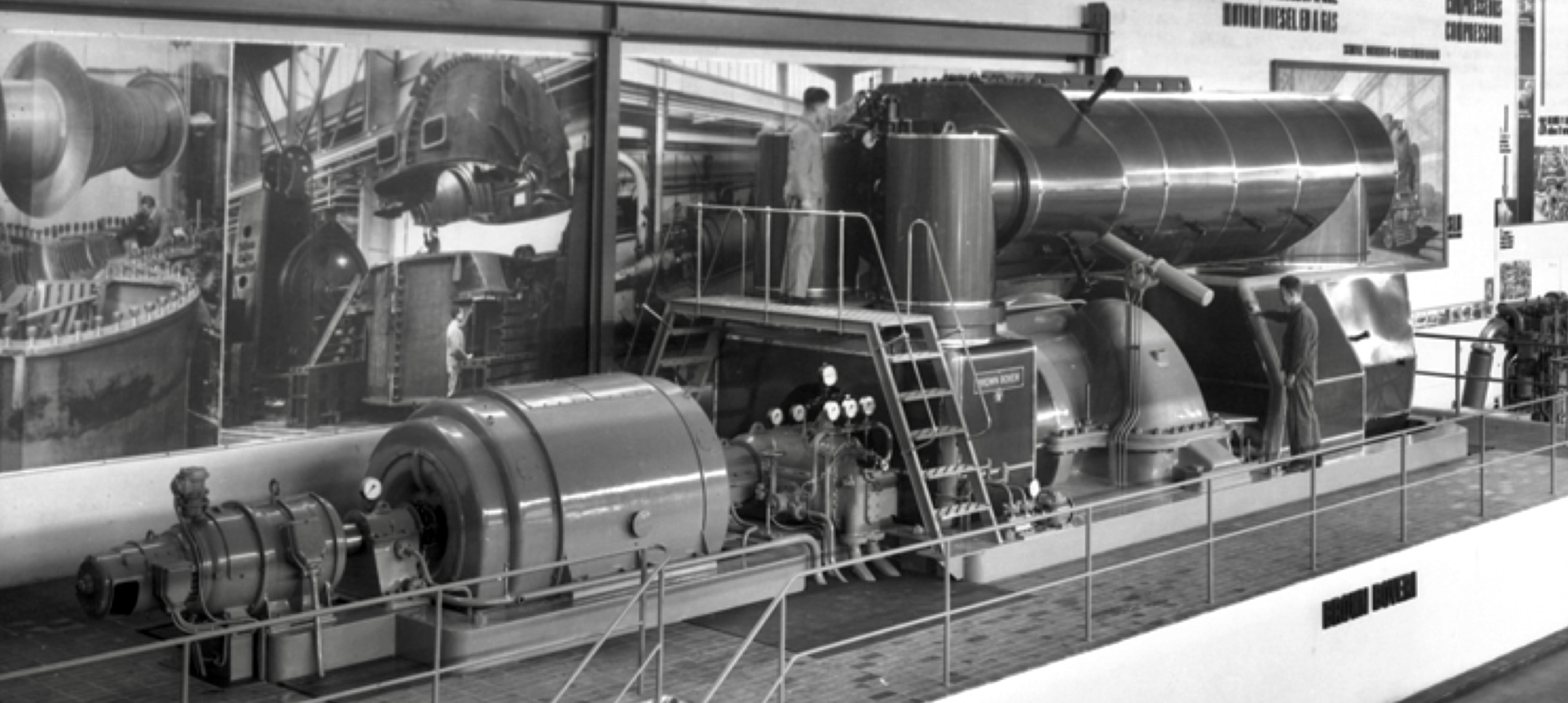
- Neuchâtel gas turbine exhibited at the 1939 Swiss National Expo in Zurich
- Classification: Gas turbine
- Application: Standby power generator
- Fuel source: Diesel
- Components: 23 stage axial compressor; Single can combustion chamber; 7 stage reaction bladed turbine; 4 MWe alternator
- Manufacturer: Brown, Boveri & Cie
- Designer: Adolf Meyer
- First run: 7 July 1939
- In-service: 1940 - 2002
- Operator: Services Industriels de la Ville de Neuchâtel

The Neuchâtel gas turbine is the world's first electric power-generating gas turbine to go into commercial operation. It was designed and constructed by Brown, Boveri & Cie and installed in 1939 at the municipal power station in Neuchâtel, Switzerland. The gas turbine was in service as a standby unit from 1940 until its retirement in 2002.

In recognition of its historical significance, the turbine was awarded "mechanical landmark" status by the American Society of Mechanical Engineers (ASME) in 1988. In 2007, the Neuchâtel gas turbine was restored and put on display at Alstom's facility in Birr, Switzerland.

== Design and development ==
Brown, Boveri & Cie first became involved with gas turbines when they began building turbo-compressors in collaboration with the French industrialist Auguste Rateau. The first machine built under this agreement was a 25 impeller, three casing centrifugal compressor for the experimental 1906 Armengaud-Lemale gas turbine.

Brown, Boveri & Cie worked on a number of experimental gas turbine projects in the 1910s and 20s. Brown, Boveri & Cie’s gas turbine collaborations included Holzwarth's explosion turbines and a two-stroke version of Herbert Humphrey’s Humphrey pump which would have been used for power generation (a so called “wet gas turbine”). None of these early gas turbine experiments produced a commercially viable product.

In the 1930s Brown, Boveri & Cie developed the commercially successful Velox boilers. Velox boilers use an axial flow air compressor driven by a flue-gas turbine to allow rapid heating of a steam boiler. The first Velox boiler was installed at the Mondeville steel works in France in 1932.

In 1936, Brown, Boveri & Cie built the world’s first constant flow industrial gas turbine for the Sun Oil refinery in Marcus Hook, Pennsylvania. These early gas turbine sets were essentially Velox boilers with the steam component removed. The Marcus Hook turbine was used for the catalyst regeneration cycle of the Houndry oil refining process and had a high enough compressor efficiency that the turbine produced a continuous power surplus that was used for electricity generation.

Brown, Boveri & Cie’s first opportunity to build a gas turbine solely for the purposes of electrical power generation came in 1938, when the Services Industriels de la Ville de Neuchâtel placed enquiries for an emergency power generator to be placed in a bomb-proof cavern. In the late 1930s, heavily protected emergency power generators were being ordered by utilities across Europe to ensure continued electrical supplies in the event of aerial bombardment. Brown, Boveri & Cie’s proposal for a 3,000 RPM, 4 MWe gas turbine was accepted. The key concerns for this application were limited space and fast starting times rather than efficiency, which suited the early open cycle gas turbines.

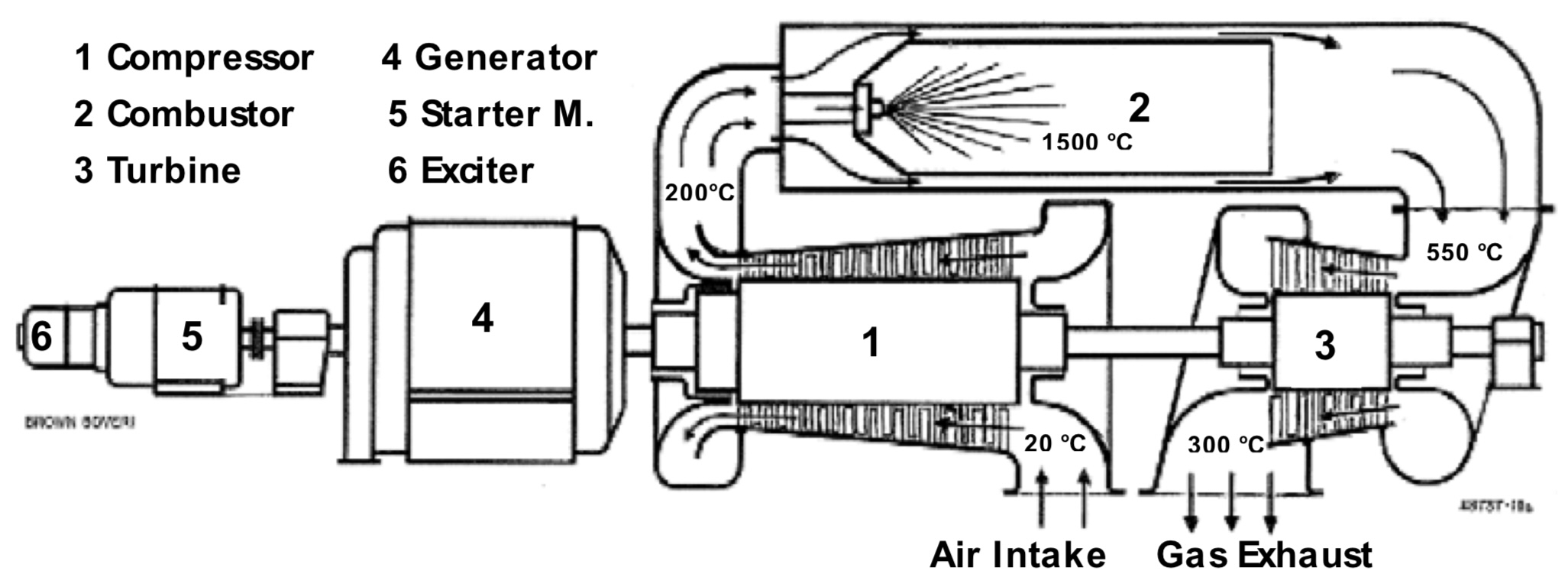
Layout of the Neuchatel gas turbine showing main components

Assembly of the Neuchâtel gas turbine set was completed in Brown, Boveri & Cie’s Baden works by the summer of 1939. Full load tests took place on 7 July under the supervision of Professor Aurel Stodola with representatives from the Swiss Association of Steam Boiler Proprietors, the Swiss Association of Electrical Engineers and the Swiss Federal Material Testing Laboratories. Power output was recorded at 4,021 kW with a cycle efficiency of 17.38%. Prior to its installation in Neuchâtel, the gas turbine was exhibited at the Swiss National Expo in Zürich.

== Operating history, retirement and preservation ==
The Neuchâtel gas turbine went into service early in 1940. In 1988 the gas turbine was awarded "mechanical landmark" status by the American Society of Mechanical Engineers (ASME) in recognition of its historical significance as the world's first electric power-generating gas turbine to go into commercial operation.

Over its 62 years in service the Neuchâtel gas turbine accumulated 7,283 operating hours and 1,908 starts. In 2002 the plant was permanently closed following damage to the gas turbine set's alternator.

In 2007, Alstom (who had acquired Brown, Boveri & Cie’s turbine business in 2000) relocated the Neuchâtel gas turbine to their facility in Birr, Aargau where it was restored and put on display.
