= John H. Humphrey =

British bacteriologist and immunologist

John Herbert Humphrey CBE FRS FRCP
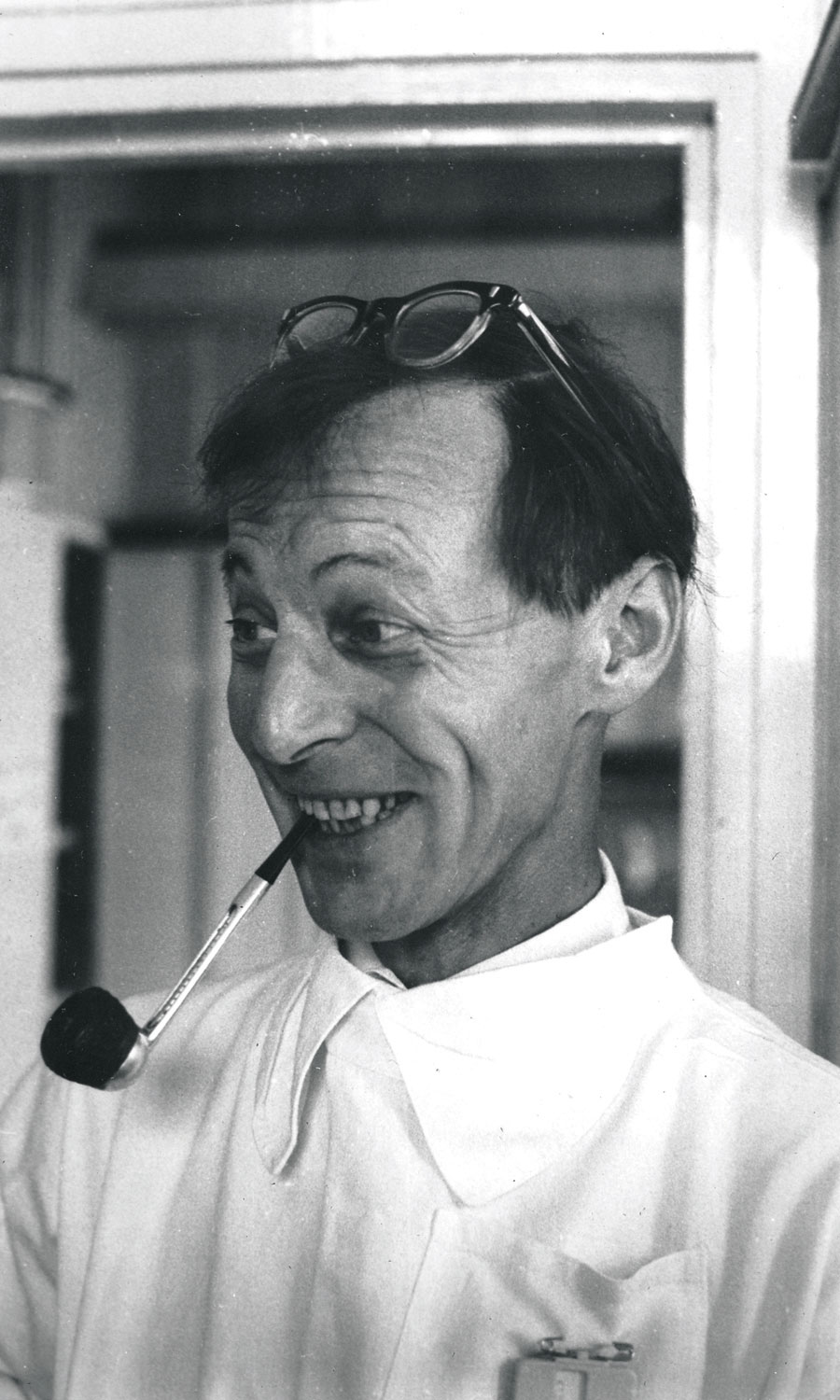
- Born: 16 December 1915
- Died: 25 December 1987 (aged 72)
- Scientific career
- Education: Trinity College, Cambridge
- Fields: Bacteriology, Immunology
- Workplaces: National Institute for Medical Research, University College Hospital

John Herbert Humphrey CBE FRS FRCP (16 December 1915 – 25 December 1987) was a British bacteriologist and immunologist.

== Education ==
He was educated at Winchester School, and Trinity College, Cambridge. He graduated from University College Hospital medical school in 1940.

== Career ==
He was a houseman at the Hammersmith Hospital, and was the Jenner research student at the Lister Institute from 1941 to 1942. He was assistant pathologist at the Central Middlesex Hospital from 1943 to 1946, then joined the external staff of the Medical Research Council as a bacteriologist at University College Hospital in 1946.

Humphrey joined the staff of the National Institute for Medical Research in 1949, working in the Division of Biological Standards. With James Lightbown he established international standards for antibiotics and enzymes, and later developed a long-standing association with the WHO Expert Committee on Biological Standards.

In 1957, he became head of the Institute's new Division of Immunology. From 1961 to 1976 Humphrey was Deputy Director of NIMR, and became acting director in 1969. In 1975, Humphrey left NIMR to be Professor of Immunology at the Royal Postgraduate Medical School, Hammersmith. He retired in 1981.

In November 1956 Humphrey founded the British Society for Immunology alongside Robin Coombs, Bob White, and Avrion Mitchison. He was president of the International Union of Immunological Societies.

== Awards and honours ==
He was elected a Fellow of the Royal Society in 1963. He delivered the 1981 Croonian Lecture to the Royal College of Physicians on The Value of Immunological Concepts in Medicine.

== Personal life ==
Humphrey was the son of Mary Elizabeth (née Horniblow) and H. A. Humphrey, the engineer who invented the Humphrey pump. His paternal aunt was Edith Humphrey, the first British woman to earn a PhD in chemistry and to identify a chiral.

At Cambridge University he met his wife Janet, the daughter of Nobel Prize–winning physiologist Archibald Hill and social reformer Margaret Hill. They had five children, including Nicholas Humphrey, and brought up Humphrey's nephew and niece after the death of Humphrey's brother.
