= John Barber (engineer) =

English coal viewer, engineer and inventor

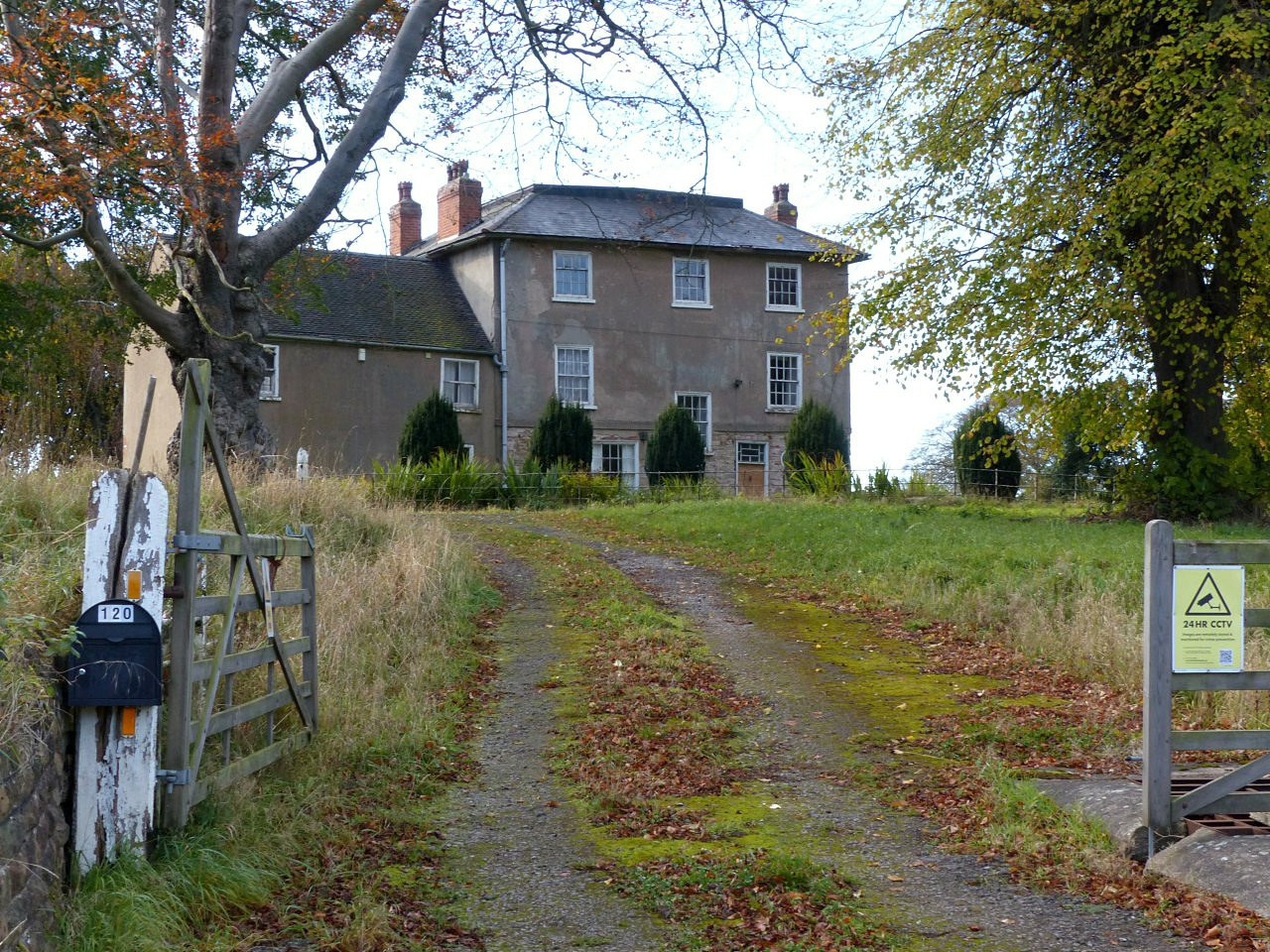
- Greasley Castle Farmhouse in 21^{st} century
- Born: 1734; Greasley, Nottinghamshire
- Died: 1793 (aged 58–59) (Note: Some sources state that Barber died in 1801.)
- Spouse: Martha Goodwin (Note: An alternative source states that John Barber, the inventor, married Ann Williams in 1785.)
- Engineering career
- Discipline: Engineering
- Projects: First gas turbine patent

John Barber (1734–1793) was an English coal viewer and inventor. He was born at Greasley Castle Farm, Nottinghamshire, to parents from both sides of the coalmining partnership of Barber and Fletcher. Barber was trained by his uncle, John Fletcher, as a coalmaster, and moved to Warwickshire in 1762 to manage his childless uncle's collieries in the Nuneaton area. The same John Barber is thought to be the inventor named in several patents granted between 1766 and 1792. (Note: In his 1791 gas turbine patent, Barber describes himself as “of Attleborough, in the parish of Nuneaton, in the county of Warwick, Gentleman." Although there is no definitive proof, the combination of the name, time period, social status, and connection to the Nuneaton area was sufficient for later authors to associate John Barber, born in 1734 at Greasley Castle Hall, Nottinghamshire, with the John Barber named in the 1791 gas turbine patent.) The most remarkable of these patents was for a gas turbine. Although nothing practical came out of this patent, Barber is recognised as the first person to describe the working principle of a constant pressure gas turbine.

== Barber's gas turbine ==
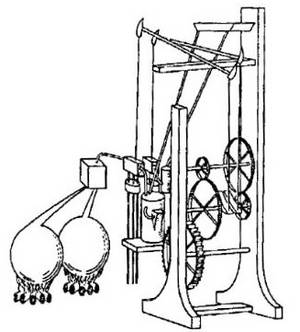
Sketch from Barber's patent

In 1791 Barber took out a patent (UK patent no. 1833 – Obtaining and Applying Motive Power, & c. A Method of Rising Inflammable Air for the Purposes of Procuring Motion, and Facilitating Metallurgical Operations) which is recognised as containing the key features of a gas turbine. Barber's design included a chain-driven, reciprocating gas compressor, a combustion chamber, and a turbine.

Barber's turbine was designed to burn producer gas obtained from wood, coal, oil, or other substances, heated in a retort or producer, from where the gases were conveyed into a receiver and cooled. Air and gas were then to be compressed in different cylinders and discharged into an exploder (combustion chamber) where they were ignited, the mixture of hot gas then being played against the vanes of a paddle wheel. Water was to be injected into the explosive mixture to cool the mouth of the chamber and, by producing steam, to increase the volume of the charge.

The patent proposed various uses for the gas turbine including propulsion of ships, barges and boats by reaction, mechanical operations (grinding, rolling, forging etc.) and injection of the exhaust stream into furnaces for smelting ores.

== Legacy ==
Given the technologies available to Barber, it is unlikely that a gas turbine could have been built that would have been able to create sufficient power to both compress the air and the gas and produce useful work. It wasn't until 1939, some 148 years after Barber's initial patent, that the first constant pressure gas turbine entered service in Neuchâtel, Switzerland.

In the same year that Brown, Boveri & Cie commissioned the Neuchâtel gas turbine the company published an article on the history of gas turbines which acknowledged John Barber's patent. John Barber is widely accepted as being the first person to patent a gas turbine.

== See also ==
- History of the internal combustion engine
