= Britalus rotary engine =

The Britalus rotary engine was invented in 1982 by Kenneth W. Porter, P.E., M.S.A.E, of King County, Washington. It operates on a modified Brayton cycle, but with continuous pulsed combustion, similar to that of a gas turbine. It can burn most commonly available hydrocarbon fuels and features the high compression ratio (14:1) typical of a Diesel cycle. The engine is patented, US Patent 4336686 of 1982.

== Overview ==
The main feature of the Britalus engine is an enclosed barrel-shaped cylinder block carrying compressor and expander pistons and rotating within a compact three-lobed stationary housing. The pistons carry rollers that follow an internal cam, causing the reciprocal motion of the pistons for compression and expansion. The rotor is statically and dynamically balanced and thereby operates with minimal vibration. A sleeve pinion gear on the rear of the rotor connects to a layshaft spur gear and provides the output shaft drive to the connected load.

Another distinguishing feature is the stationary slotted sleeve valve enclosing the single combustion chamber, and its co-axial slotted sleeve carried by the rotating cylinder barrel. This feature enables the charging air to enter the combustion chamber and allows evacuation later of the products of combustion to the expander cylinders and pistons.

== Similar engines ==
Similar external combustion rotary engines have been patented by:

- Everett F. Irwin, Patents US4458480 of 1984 and US4531360 of 1985
- Tigane Rein, Patent WO2003087563 of 2003
