= Edith Humphrey =

British chemist

Edith Ellen Humphrey
- Edith Humphrey in her laboratory.
- Born: 11 September 1875
- Died: 25 February 1978 (aged 102)
- Education: Bedford College

Edith Ellen Humphrey (11 September 1875 – 25 February 1978) was a British inorganic chemist who carried out pioneering work in co-ordination chemistry at the University of Zurich under Alfred Werner. She is thought to be the first British woman to obtain a doctorate in chemistry and the first chemist to synthesize a chiral inorganic complex.

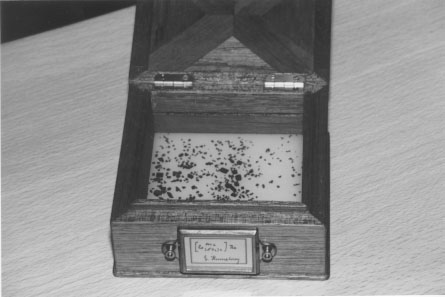
Sample of crystals prepared by Edith Humphrey around 1900

On the occasion of the 150th anniversary of the Royal Society of Chemistry (RSC), 8 April 1991, a sample of the original crystals synthesised by Humphrey for her PhD were sent to them by the Swiss Committee of Chemistry, together with a modern CD spectrum of a solution of one crystal. This box of crystals remains on display in the exhibition room of the RSC.

== Early life and education ==
Edith Humphrey was born on 11 September 1875 at 41 Lismore Road, Kentish Town, London. She was the youngest of the seven surviving children of Louisa (née Frost, 1831–1911) and John Charles Humphrey (1833–1903). Her mother had been a dressmaker before marriage, and her father was a clerk at the London Metropolitan Board of Works and later London County Council.

John Humphrey had started life in poor circumstances, his father having been a bootmaker, and he was a great supporter of education for his daughters as well as his sons. Edith grew up in a middle-class household in Kentish Town, London. Her two elder sisters became teachers, and her brothers, including Herbert Alfred Humphrey (1868–1951), inventor of the Humphrey pump, and William Humphrey (1863–1898), head of the Fourah Bay College in Freetown, Sierra Leone, were educated to degree level.

Humphrey attended Camden School for Girls and then, from 1891, North London Collegiate School, one of the first girls' schools in the UK to include science in the curriculum. Both schools were set up by Frances Buss.

From 1893 to 1897 Humphrey studied chemistry (and physics) at Bedford College, London, with a scholarship of £60 per annum. On completion of her degree, she applied to do a PhD at the University of Zurich.

== Postgraduate research ==
On 17 October 1898, Humphrey matriculated for chemistry at the University of Zurich. She joined a growing band of Alfred Werner's students, working in the inadequate cellars known as the "Katakomben" (catacombs). Humphrey was awarded a grant of £60 a year for three years by the Technical Education Board of the London County Council, but studying in Switzerland was expensive, and Humphrey was "hard up". Werner recognised Humphrey's ability and appointed her as his assistant, with a salary, the first woman to occupy the post. Humphrey worked hard, and her account of the time suggests that she found the social life disappointing.

Humphrey was "the first of his students to succeed in preparing Werner's first new series of geometrically isomeric cobalt complexes, a class of compounds that were crucial in his development and proof of his coordination theory." One of these compounds, the cis-bis(ethylenediamine)dinitrocobalt(III) bromide, was the first synthesis of a chiral octahedral cobalt complex. In 1991, the Swiss Committee on Chemistry donated Humphrey's chiral crystals to the Royal Society of Chemistry, and they are now at Burlington House, in London.

"What a pity for Miss Humphrey that it was not recognized at the time, because she would then have been responsible for an unequivocal proof of the soundness of Werner's coordination theory and the subsequent award of the Nobel prize to him." While one later study has cast doubt on the quality of the sample, Humphrey's status as a pioneer woman scientist remains significant.

Her doctoral thesis Über die Bindungsstelle der Metalle in ihren Verbindungen und über Dinitritoäthylendiaminkobaltisalze was accepted by the University of Zurich in 1901. Humphrey was the first British woman to obtain a doctorate in chemistry, though not the first in Zurich. An American chemist, Rachel Holloway Lloyd, had already done so in 1887, and it had become "a haven for women students from all over Europe".

On completion of her thesis, Humphrey was recommended to move to Leipzig University to continue research under Wilhelm Ostwald. However, the attitude to women there was quite different from Zurich, and she would not tolerate a regime where she was not allowed to work in the laboratories in case her presence distracted the men from their work.

== Later life ==
After her return to England, Humphrey joined the staff of Arthur Sanderson & Sons, a British manufacturer of fabrics and wallpaper, where she worked until she retired. She was employed as a research chemist at their factory in Chiswick, but little is known of her work there. In the 1911 census, she was living in Hampstead with her two elder sisters, and gave her profession simply as "chemist".

In 1904, Humphrey was one of nineteen women chemists to petition the Chemical Society for admission of women to fellowship. This was eventually granted in 1920 after the Sex Disqualification (Removal) Act 1919 was passed. Humphrey was subsequently elected to fellowship on 4 May 1933, twenty-nine years after she signed the first petition to the society.

An interview with Humphrey about her experiences in Zurich was published in the New Scientist on her 100th birthday, 11 September 1975.

Edith Humphrey died on 25 February 1978 in Highgate, London.

In July 2023, the Oxford Dictionary of National Biography published an entry on Humphrey.

== See also ==
Rayner-Canham, Maralene; Rayner-Canham, Geoff (3 December 2008). Chemistry Was Their Life: Pioneering British Women Chemists, 1880–1949. Imperial College Press. ISBN 978-1860949869.
