= Holzwarth gas turbine =

Early type of gas turbine engine

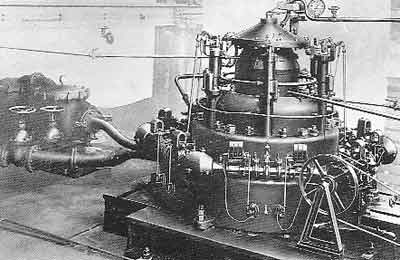
- A Holzwarth gas turbine prototype on the test bench at the Körting Brothers workshop in 1908
- Classification: Gas turbine
- Application: Electrical power generation
- Fuel source: Coal gas, blast furnace gas, fuel oil or coal dust
- Inventor: Hans Holzwarth
- Invented: 1903
- Total Units: 8 single-stage 2 dual-stage
- Manufacturers: Körting Brothers, Thyssen and Brown, Boveri & Cie

The Holzwarth gas turbine is a form of explosion, or constant volume, gas turbine where an air–fuel mixture is admitted, ignited and then exhausted from combustion chambers controlled by valves. The Holzwarth gas turbine is named after its developer Hans Holzwarth (1877–1953) who designed several prototype engines used for testing and experimental service in Germany and Switzerland between 1908 and 1943.

Early efforts to build practical gas turbines struggled with the low efficiency of contemporary turbo compressors as these consumed almost all of the energy supplied by the turbine. In a Holzwarth gas turbine, high compressor efficiency is not needed since almost all the pressure rise takes place in sealed combustion chambers. The drawback of this approach is the high heat losses to the surrounding water jacket and correspondingly low cycle efficiency.

The last and largest Holzwarth gas turbine was a 5,000-kilowatt (6,705 hp) unit supplied to the Thyssen steelworks in Hamborn during 1938. The turbine was run experimentally until 1943 when it was damaged during an air raid. The machine was not repaired, and no further Holzwarth gas turbines were built.

== Design and development ==
After completing his studies in mechanical engineering at the University of Stuttgart, Hans Holzwarth spent a short period of time working for the manufacturing company MAN before joining Hooven-Owens-Rentschler in the United States where he worked on the design of steam turbines. It was in 1903, while he was an employee of Hooven-Owens-Rentschler, that Holzwarth first patented his design for an explosion, or constant volume, gas turbine. Holzwarth went on to dedicate his career to the development of the explosion gas turbine and was granted nearly 200 patents, the last being published posthumously in 1957. Between 1906 and 1908, Holzwarth built a small demonstration machine at the Körting Brother's workshop in Hanover. This first machine is now on display at the Deutsches Museum in Munich.

In modern constant pressure gas turbines, a compressor is needed to deliver pressurized air to the combustion chamber while also being efficient enough not to drain too much of the turbine's power. The relatively poor efficiency of early centrifugal compressors made building a commercially viable constant pressure gas turbine impractical. In Holzwarth's constant volume design, combustion takes place in a closed chamber where the air–fuel mixture is ignited electrically in a manner similar to the Otto cycle in spark-ignition engines. Since the pressure rise is driven primarily by the explosive expansion of gasses in the combustion chamber, an efficient compressor is not needed.

Holzwarth's design attracted the attention of Brown, Boveri & Cie. who had collaborated on the 1906 Armengaud-Lemale gas turbine which had been unable to generate usable power in part due to poor compressor efficiency. From 1909, Holzwarth worked with Brown, Boveri & Cie to build a market-ready 1,000-horsepower (746 kW) gas turbine however output and efficiency were below expectations and Brown, Boveri & Cie withdrew from the project in 1912.

Holzwarth continued to work on his design while he was employed as chief engineer for gas turbines at Thyssen. In 1923, a prototype machine was delivered to the Prussian state railway where it was used to drive a 350-kilowatt (469 hp) generator for several years. During this period tests were carried out using coal dust fuel which was found to burn acceptably in the combustion chamber but produced exhaust particles which damaged turbine blades. In 1927, Hans Holzwarth left Thyssen & Co and founded his own company, Holzwarth Gasturbinen GmbH.

In 1927, Aurel Stodola tested a 500-kilowatt (671 hp) oil-fired Holzwarth gas turbine and found that only 8% of the fuel's energy was transformed into mechanical energy with most of the remaining energy being lost to the cooling water jacket. Brown, Boveri & Cie's engineers recognized that the heat lost to the cooling water could be used to drive a steam turbine. This led to the development of the commercially-successful Velox boilers, which in turn led to the development of the first modern industrial gas turbines.

In 1928, Holzwarth once again collaborated with Brown, Boveri & Cie to build a version of his gas turbine with two sets of combustion chambers connected in series. These two-stage machines used a compressor driven by a steam turbine which was fed from the evaporation of water from the cooling water jacket. In 1933, a two-stage machine driving a 2,000-kilowatt (2,682 hp) generator was installed at the Thyssen steelworks in Hamborn where it was initially operated with fuel oil and later with blast furnace gas.

The last Holzwarth gas turbine was an experimental 5,000-kilowatt (6,705 hp) machine built by Brown, Boveri & Cie's Mannheim factory in 1938 for the Hamborn steelworks. Fuel for combustion was blast-furnace gas compressed to about 6 bar (87 psi). The gas turbine had hydraulically operated valves working at 60–100 cycles per minute. The unit was only infrequently run and was not part of the steelwork's regular equipment. In 1943, the gas turbine was damaged during an Allied bombing raid after which no further test runs were made. After World War II ended, interest in the Holzwarth design declined and no further units were built.

== Operation ==
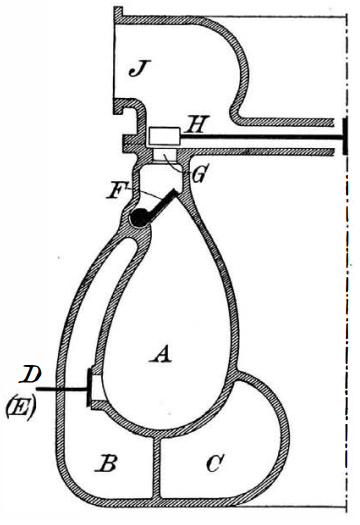
Diagrammatic section through one of the combustion chambers of a Holzwarth gas turbine

The combustion chamber (A) is filled intermittently with an air–fuel mixture supplied by the gas chamber (C) and the air chamber (B). The air–fuel mixture is ignited by a spark after which the explosion of the mixture causes an increase in pressure throwing open the nozzle valve (F), allowing the compressed gases to flow through the nozzle (G) to the turbine wheel (H) on which the work is to be performed. While passing through the nozzle, the gases are expanded to the pressure of the exhaust (J). The nozzle valve (F) is kept open by fresh air throughout the expansion and subsequent scavenging and cooling.

When the expansion has been completed, the air is blown, or drawn, in at a slight pressure through the valve (D). This scavenging air throws any residual gases left in the combustion chamber through the nozzle, into the exhaust, after which the nozzle valve and the air valve (D) are positively closed. At this point the combustion chamber (A) is filled with pure, relatively cold air, into which the pure fuel (gas or atomized oil) is blown through the valve (E), thus forming the explosive air–fuel mixture which is ignited by a spark. In order to make the impulses imparted to the turbine wheel more uniform, several combustion chambers working alternately are arranged in a circle around the turbine wheel (H).

In early Holzwarth machines, gas and air were supplied at a relatively low pressure around 0.1–1 bar (1–15 psi) in later models a gas compressor was used to supply fuel at pressures up to 6 bar (87 psi). The gas compressor was driven by a steam turbine fed from the evaporation of water from the gas turbine cooling jacket which required the addition of a surface condenser package.

The two Holzwarth gas turbines built by Brown, Boveri & Cie after 1928 used two stages of combustion chambers and a "two stroke" version of the cycle where gas admission and exhaust took place simultaneously. The first stage comprised the final charging of the combustion chamber, the explosion, the delivery of heat and energy in the steam generator and gas turbine. The second stage comprised the scavenging and the pre-charging. The residual exhaust gases escaped through an economizer to the atmosphere.

== Surviving example ==
This first prototype Holzwarth gas turbine is on display at the Deutsches Museum in Munich.

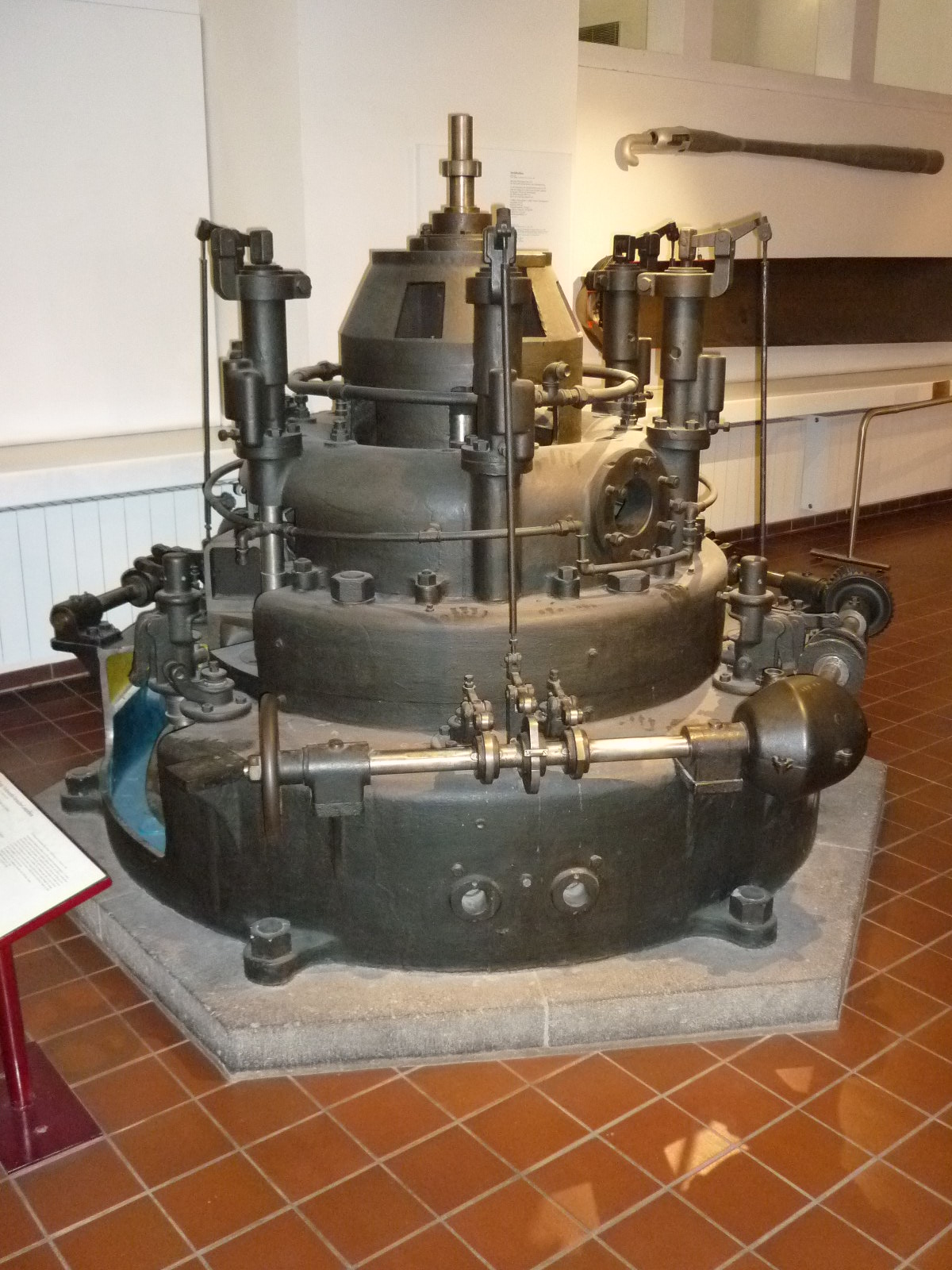
Gas Turbine

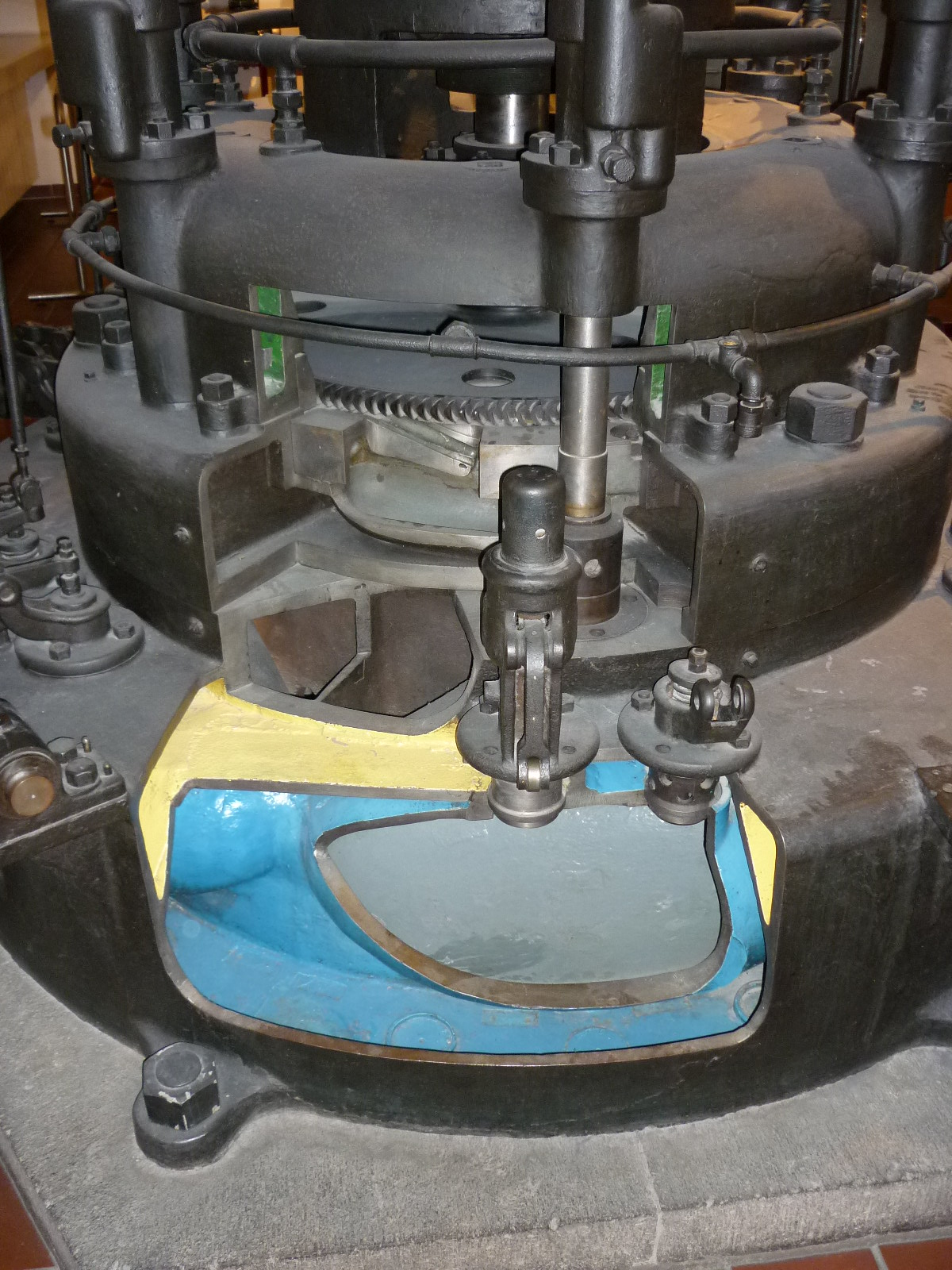
Cutaway section
