= H. A. Humphrey =

British engineer

Herbert Humphrey
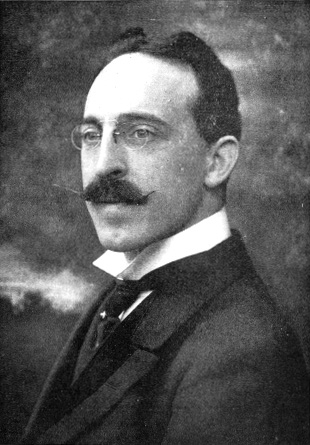
- Born: 2 December 1868; London, United Kingdom
- Died: 9 March 1951 (aged 82); Hermanus, South Africa
- Education: Finsbury Technical College and the Central Institution
- Occupations: Scientist, engineer and inventor
- Known for: Inventing the Humphrey Pump
- Spouse: Mary Elizabeth Horniblow
- Children: 2 daughters and 3 sons (one of whom was the bacteriologist John H. Humphrey

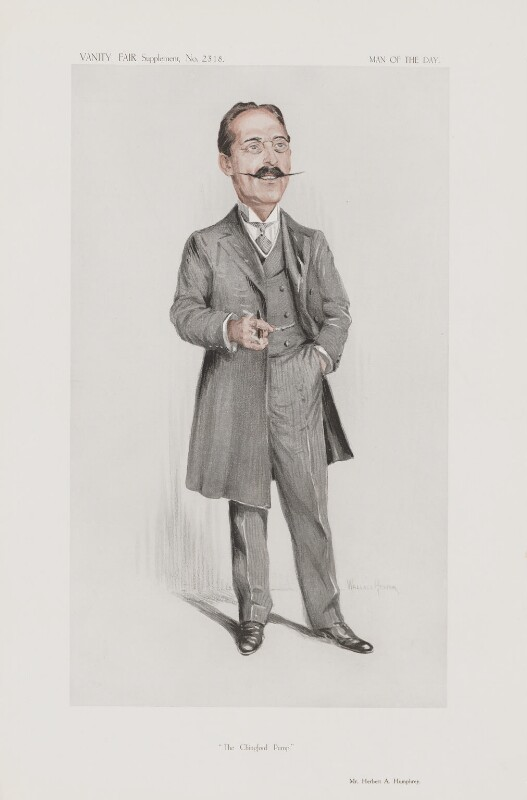
Caricature of Humphrey by Wallace Hester published 1905 in the Men of the Day series in Vanity Fair.

Herbert Alfred Humphrey MInstCE MIMechE MIEE FCGI (2 December 1868 – 9 March 1951) was a British engineer, inventor of the Humphrey pump.

== Early life and education ==
Humphrey was born in Gospel Oak, London, to Louisa (née Frost, 1831–1911) and John Charles Humphrey (1833–1903). His mother had been a dressmaker before marriage, and his father was a clerk at the London Metropolitan Board of Works and later London County Council. Edith Humphrey, thought to be the first British woman to obtain a doctorate in chemistry, was his younger sister. He trained at the Finsbury Technical College and the Central Institution (which later became the City and Guilds College).

== Career and the invention of the Humphrey pump ==
After graduating from college, Humphrey was employed for four years by Heenan & Froude at their Newton Heath iron works before joining Brunner Mond in Northwich as the engineering manager of their refined bicarbonate and crystal department. In 1901, at the age of 33, Humphrey set up his own engineering consultancy in London. The consultancy was set up with the support of Ludwig Mond and performed research work for Brunner Mond, specifically to find industrial and commercial uses for Mond gas.

In 1906, Humphery wrote his first patent covering the workings of the Humphrey pump (a large internal combustion gas-fueled liquid piston pump). Humphrey worked on the development and marketing of the pump between 1906 and 1914. A Humphrey pump was exhibited at the 1910 Brussels Exhibition, where it was awarded two Grands Prix. Licenses to produce the Humphrey pump and Humphrey cycle engines were negotiated with a number of firms including Beardmore, Brown Boveri and Siemens. Ultimately only ten Humphrey pumps were built for commercial operation, however some continued in service into the 1960s.

During World War I, Humphrey offered his services to the War Office where he worked on improving the production of explosives. After the war, Humphrey returned to consultancy and was associated with Imperial Chemical Industries until his retirement in 1941.

Humphrey was awarded the Melchett Medal in 1939 by the Institute of Fuel.

== Personal life ==
Humphrey was married to Mary Elizabeth Horniblow. They had three sons and two daughters, including the bacteriologist John H. Humphrey. In 1945, Hebert Humphrey moved to Hermanus, Cape Province, Union of South Africa. He died there in 1951.

A collection of Humphrey's papers is held in the archives of Imperial College London.
