= Auguste Rateau =

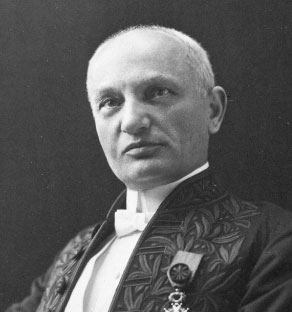
- Born: Auguste Camille Edmond Rateau; 13 October 1863; Royan, France
- Died: 13 January 1930 (aged 66); Neuilly-sur-Seine, France
- Occupations: Engineer, industrialist
- Known for: Turbines, turbocharging

Auguste Rateau (French pronunciation: [oɡyst ʁato]; 13 October 1863 – 13 January 1930) was an engineer and industrialist born in Royan, France, specializing in turbomachinery.

== Biography ==
After studies at the École Polytechnique, Rateau began an academic career at the École des Mines de Paris, gaining the rank of Inspector of Mines in 1886. In 1888 he was appointed as a professor at the École des Mines de Saint-Étienne. In 1898 he was appointed as a professor of electrical engineering at the École supérieure des Mines de Paris. It was Rateau's early work on mine ventilation which laid the foundation of his work on turbines and turbochargers.

In 1896 he patented a multi-stage steam impulse turbine, which brough him widespread recognition in engineering circles. At the 1900 Paris Exposition, he exhibited designs for a turbine installation in a torpedo boat.

In 1903, he founded the Société Rateau, which grew rapidly into a major enterprise employing around 3,000 workers, with branches across Europe. While the steam turbine remained his primary focus, he also achieved notable success with compound centrifugal air compressors. Rateau designed the large multistage centrifugal air compressors, built by Brown, Boveri & Cie, for the experimental 1906 Armengaud-Lemale gas turbine.

Rateau was also active in the field of turbocharging for aircraft and marine applications. In 1918, a Renault 12F fitted with one of his turbochargers was installed in a Breguet 14 aircraft where it achieved notable improvements in performance. After the end of World War I, a Breguet 14 with a Rateau turbocharger set a world altitude record with the type later equipping a French Air Force squadron.

Rateau was a Commander of the Legion of Honour (Commandeur de l'Ordre national de la Légion d'honneur) and a member of the French Academy of Sciences (Académie des sciences). His work was also recognised outside of France with honorary degrees being bestowed on him by the Universities of Birmingham, Charlottenburg, Leuven and Wisconsin. The American Society of Mechanical Engineers elected Rateau an honorary member in 1919.
