= Blast furnace gas =

Gas mixture as by-product of steelworks

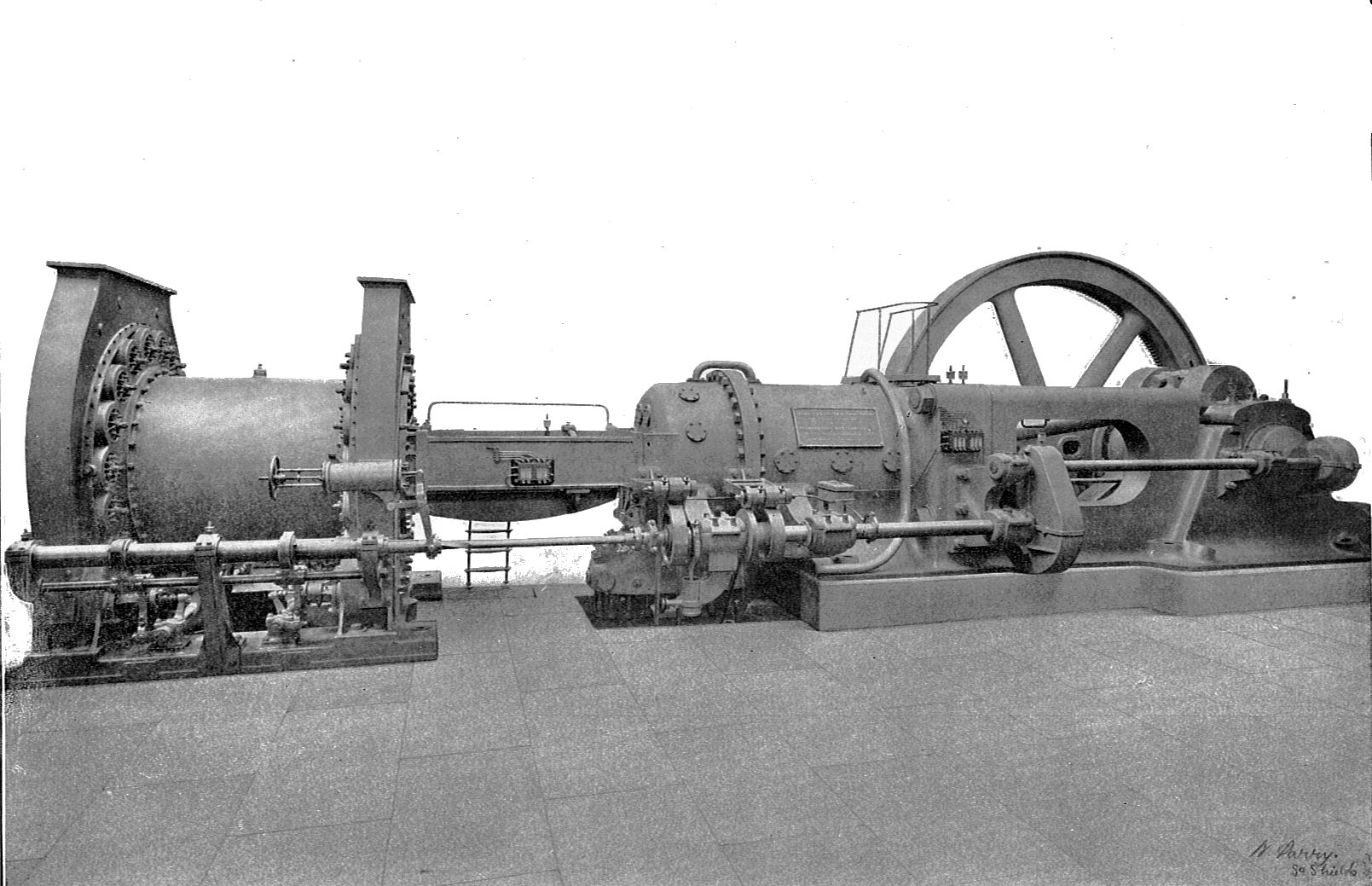
An early internal combustion blowing engine of around 1900, powered by furnace gas

Blast furnace gas (BFG) is a by-product of blast furnaces that is generated when the iron ore is reduced with coke to metallic iron. It has a very low heating value, about 3.5 MJ/m^{3} (93 BTU/cu.ft), because it consists of about 51 vol% nitrogen and 22 vol% carbon dioxide, which are not flammable. The rest amounts to around 22 vol% carbon monoxide, which has a fairly low heating value already and 5 vol% hydrogen. Per ton of steel produced via the blast furnace route, 2.5 to 3.5 tons of blast furnace gas is produced. It is commonly used as a fuel within the steel works, but it can be used in boilers and power plants equipped to burn it. It may be combined with natural gas or coke oven gas before combustion or a flame support with richer gas or oil is provided to sustain combustion. Particulate matter is removed so that it can be burned more cleanly. Blast furnace gas is sometimes flared without generating heat or electricity.

Blast furnace gas is generated at higher pressure and at about 100–150 °C (212–302 °F) in a modern blast furnace. This pressure is utilized to operate a generator (a top-gas-pressure recovery turbine (TRT)), which can generate electrical energy up to 35 kWh/t of pig iron without burning any fuel. Dry type TRTs can generate more power than wet type TRTs.

The auto ignition point of blast furnace gas is approximate 630–650 °C (1,166–1,202 °F) and it has a lower explosive limit (LEL) of 27% and an upper explosive limit (UEL) of 75% in an air-gas mixture at normal temperature and pressure.

The high concentration of carbon monoxide makes the gas hazardous.

== See also ==
- Coal-bed methane
- Exhaust gas
- Flue gas
- Fuel gas
- History of manufactured gas

== Sources ==
- International Energy Agency
- Yan, Jessica (2004). "Temperature of a Blast Furnace". The Physics Factbook.
