= Humphrey pump =

Large internal-combustion gas-fuelled liquid-piston pump

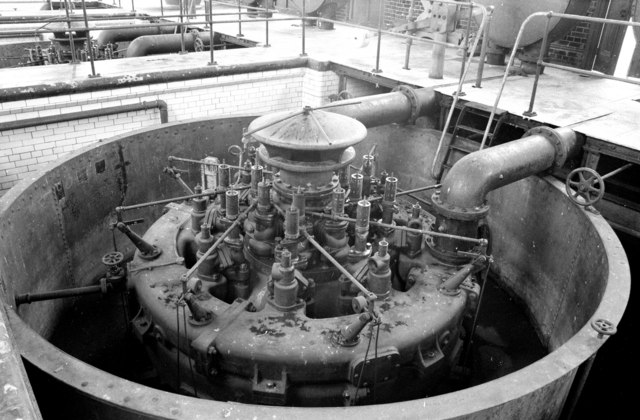
- The top of a Humphrey pump at the King George V pumping station in London
- Classification: Gas-fueled liquid piston pump
- Application: Water pumps for sewage, utility, irrigation and drydocks
- Fuel source: Coal gas, Producer gas or Natural gas
- Inventor: H. A. Humphrey
- Invented: 1909

The Humphrey pump is a large internal combustion gas-fueled liquid piston pump. The pump was invented by H. A. Humphrey and first presented in paper to the Institution of Mechanical Engineers on 19 November 1909. A pump capable of pumping 250,000 gallons per hour to a head of 35 feet was exhibited at the 1910 Brussels Exhibition, where it was awarded two Grands Prix, for both engines and pumps.

A small number of pumps were built between 1906 and 1925 for use in large-scale water supply projects. Although only a few pumps were built, some continued in service into the 1960s.

== Operation ==
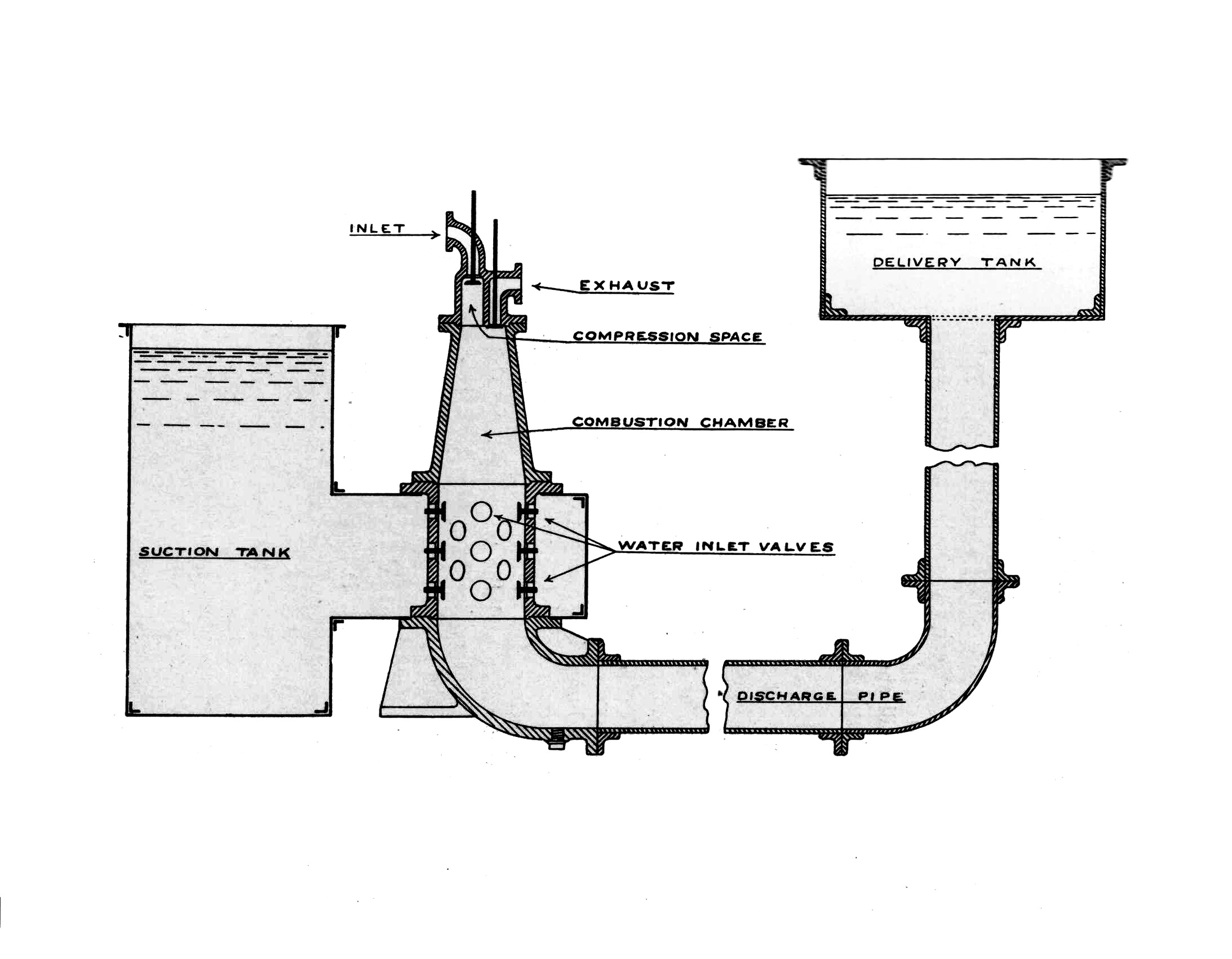
Humphrey Pump (Wimperis, 1915)

Humphrey's pump consists of a large U-shaped tube, filled with water. One end is sealed by a heavy cast iron, or steel, 'combustion head'. The combustion head contains the inlet and exhaust valves, the ignition source and withstands the pressure of the combustion chamber. Water enters the pump through sprung inlet valves below the combustion chamber. A distinctive feature of the Humphrey pump, compared to others, is that the water only has to flow through this single set of valves: there are no non-return outlet valves, only the inertia of the delivered water within the outlet pipe is used to control its flow. As there are no delivery valves opening and closing suddenly, the water flow changes smoothly, avoiding water hammer and the usual problems for this type of pump.

Combustible gas, mixed with air, is supplied into the combustion chamber and then fired by an electric spark. The force of the expanding gas drives water downwards from the combustion chamber and accelerates it along the delivery pipe. Once the chamber pressure drops to that of the inlet water, the delivered water is no longer being accelerated but the large mass of water in the long pipe continues to flow by its own inertia. This reduces the pressure in the chamber below atmospheric, which causes the inlet air and gas valves to open, drawing in fresh air as a scavenging effect. As the water begins to flow back down the U, this increases the chamber pressure and causes the exhaust valves to open.

=== Four-stroke and two-stroke cycles ===
H A Humphrey patented both four-stroke and two-stroke versions of his engine. The four-stroke design required mechanical interlocks to the inlet valves, so that the exhaust and scavenge valves open once during the cycle to allow scavenging of the exhaust, but not during the compression cycle afterwards. A two-stroke cycle was also possible, if adequate scavenging could be achieved. The air trapped within the combustion chamber of a Humphrey pump has two roles: both for combustion and also as an air spring to maintain the oscillating water column. As this spring action involves a large volume of air, relative to the minimal air needed for combustion, the air cools easily to below the ignition temperature to pre-ignite the next charge. There would still be a risk of inefficient four-stroking though, unless the scavenging is effective enough to sweep out the previous exhaust gases. This was done by using a tall, thin combustion chamber so that the combustion air remained roughly isolated from the majority of the chamber's air and so was scavenged through the exhaust valves first. There was no separate scavenge air valve.

A large amount of experimental work on the two-stroke version of the Humphrey engine was conducted by multiple companies in the hope of improving the type's efficiency and power density. In practice however it was impossible to prevent the incoming gas from mingling with the products from the previous combustion cycle resulting in the loss of gas through the exhaust valves.

The only 2-stroke Humphrey pump to enter service was a single example designed by A.P Steckel and installed at the Sun shipyard in Pennsylvania in 1925. All other commercial installations were of the 4-stroke type.

=== Limitations and advantages ===
The main limitation of the Humphrey pump is that it has no suction capacity, in fact it must be installed in a dry sump several meters below the supply level. Given the pump's physical size and the need to protect the equipment against flood events, this is no small engineering exercise, requiring (in the Cobdogla example) several thousand tons of concrete.

Its advantages however are: with no moving parts except for the dozens of spring-loaded inlet valves, it has low maintenance and high reliability. The Humphrey pump's efficiency was also good by the standards of the time. The demonstration pump exhibited at the Brussels exhibition was tested by Prof W.C Unwin in 1909 and was found to require around 33% less fuel gas than would have been consumed had contemporary gas burning engines been used drive pumps moving the same amount of water to the same height.

== Installed pumps ==
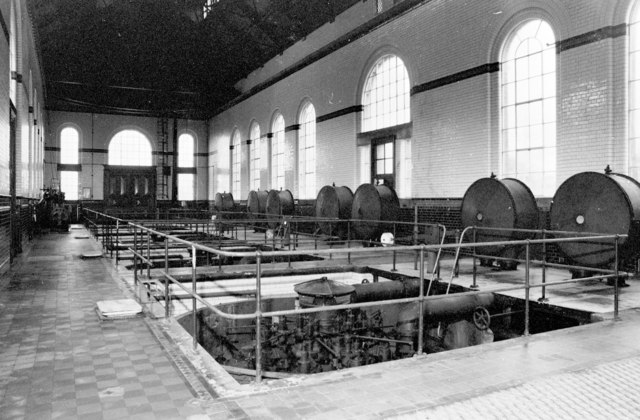
Pump house at King George V Reservoir, 1985

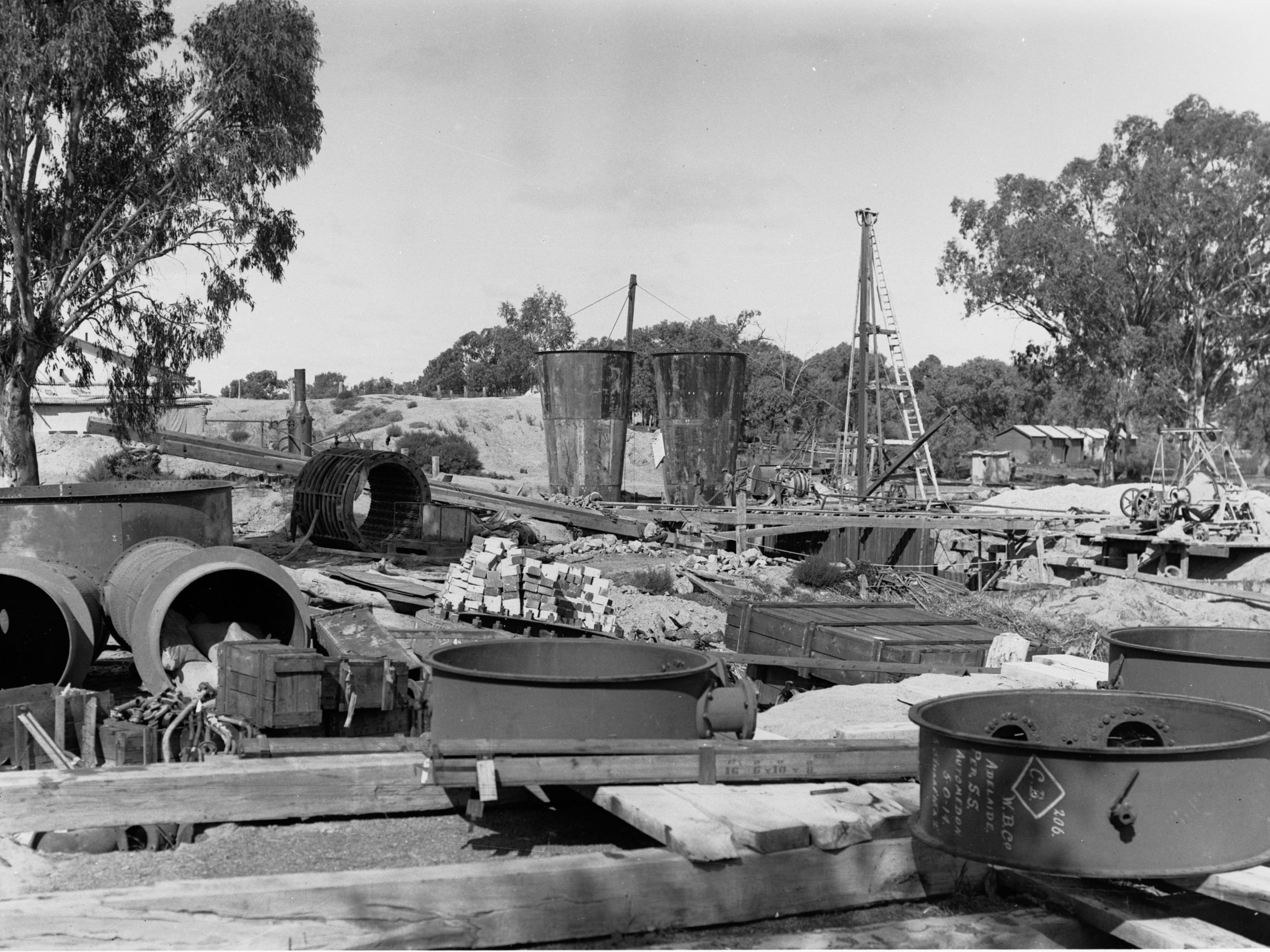
Installing one of the Humphrey pumps at Cobdogla, 1924

Ten Humphrey pumps are known to have been built for commercial service between 1912 and 1925:

King George V Reservoir, near Chingford in East London, had four Humphrey pumps installed when the pumping station was first constructed in 1912. Each pump was capable of pumping 40,000,000 gallons of water per day. A fifth, smaller, pump was added later. The pumps were built by Siemens at their facility in Stafford, England.

A single 66" diameter pump was installed at Del Rio, Texas in 1914. This was constructed by the Humphrey Gas Pump Co. of Syracuse, NY, who had licensed the Humphrey patents.

A single Humphrey pump was installed at a Sewage works in Southend-on-Sea, England during 1914. The pump had head of 65 ft at a capacity of 198,000 gallons per day. Construction works started for a second pump but was cancelled in 1915.

Two pumps, each rated at 1,500,000 imperial gallons (6.8 Ml) per hour (36,000,000 imperial gallons (160 Ml) per day), were installed at Cobdogla, on the Murray River in Australia, from 1923. These were constructed by William Beardmore and Company in Glasgow and shipped out to Australia for assembly.

A 36" cylinder bore Humphrey pump was installed at Chester, Pennsylvania in 1927 by the Sun Shipbuilding and Dry Dock Company. The pump was used in dry dock operations and also for experimental purposes. It was designed as a 2-stroke engine to operate in a range of head from 20 to 150 ft (6 to 46 m). The engine was installed in a 18 ft 6 (5.6 m) diameter and 50 ft (15.25 m) deep steel caisson, about 40 ft below the Delaware river. Air was supplied to the engine at this depth through a compressor. The pump underwent endurance tests 8 hrs a day in 1925 – 27 before switching to 24 hrs a day with water at head of 150 ft for weeks in 1928.

== Proposed installations ==
A very large drainage and irrigation plant for Egypt was also considered in 1914. Construction of this was disrupted, owing to the outbreak of World War I. It was originally to use eighteen pumps, each delivering 100,000,000 gallons per day to a head of 20 feet. Each pump chamber was to be 8 ft 8 in in diameter and 14 ft high. Final construction would have used ten pumps, five by Beardmore's and five by the Italian division of Brown Boveri.

== Similar pumps ==
A similar pump, the Joy pump, was also described at around the same time. This was much smaller, around six inches in diameter rather than six feet, and also had much smaller water pipe connections to it. This reduced water mass also reduced the compression ratio available in the combustion chamber, leading to reduced efficiency. The pump's ability to work with a suction lift of a few feet, rather than needing to be submerged like the Humphrey pump, was a convenience though. This pump was thought to have some application for small-scale or portable tasks, where its convenience outweighed efficiency.

== Surviving examples ==
The Chingford pumps were replaced by electric pumps in the 1960s, although three of the pumps remain in situ.

Cobdogla's pumps ran from 1927 to 1965. In 1985 one was restored as a working example and was awarded an IMechE Engineering Heritage Award.

The construction of a working model of a Humphrey pump was completed in 2008 and the model was demonstrated at various open days at UK museums.

== Gallery ==
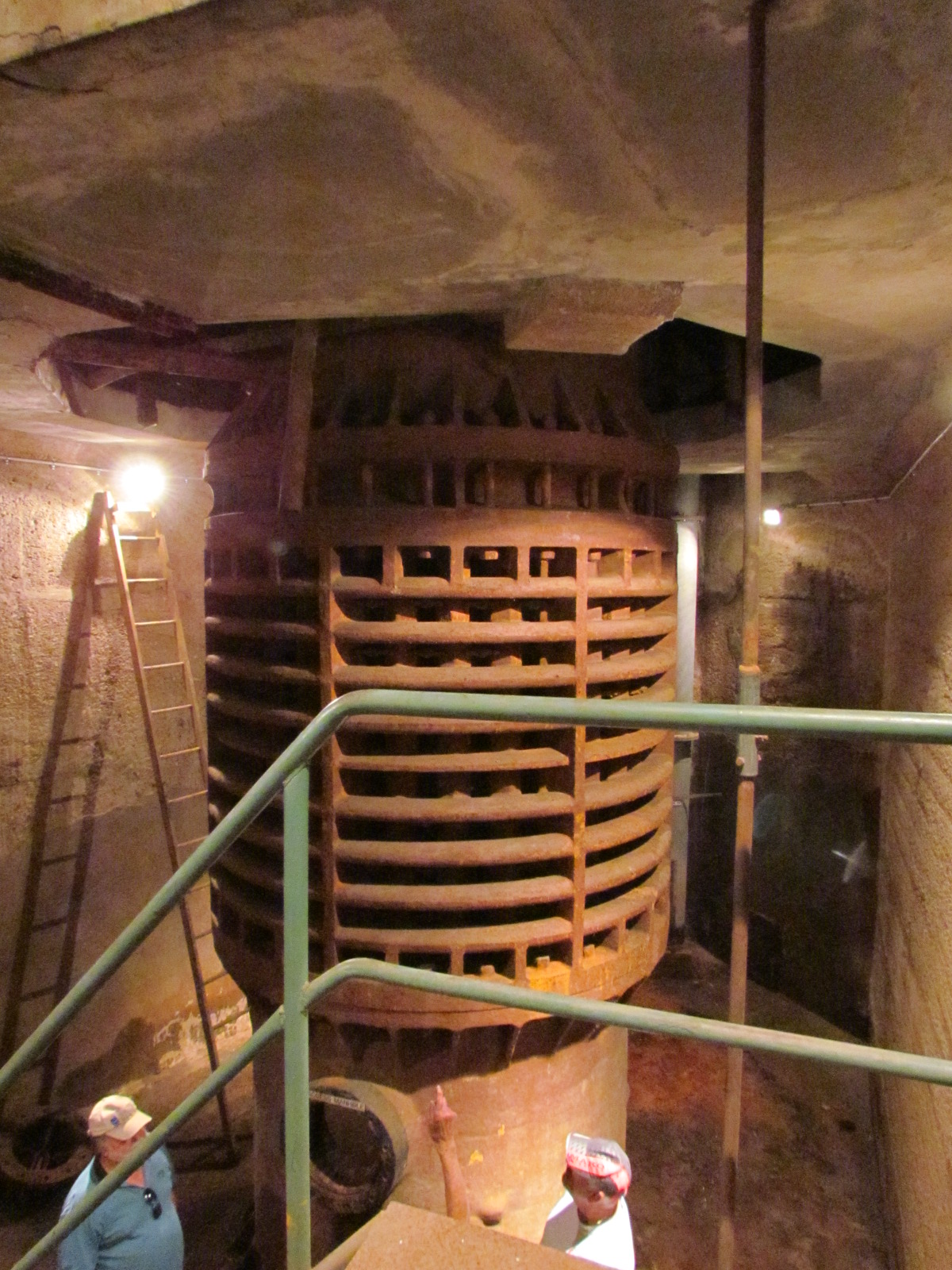
Inlet valve section,
Cobdogla

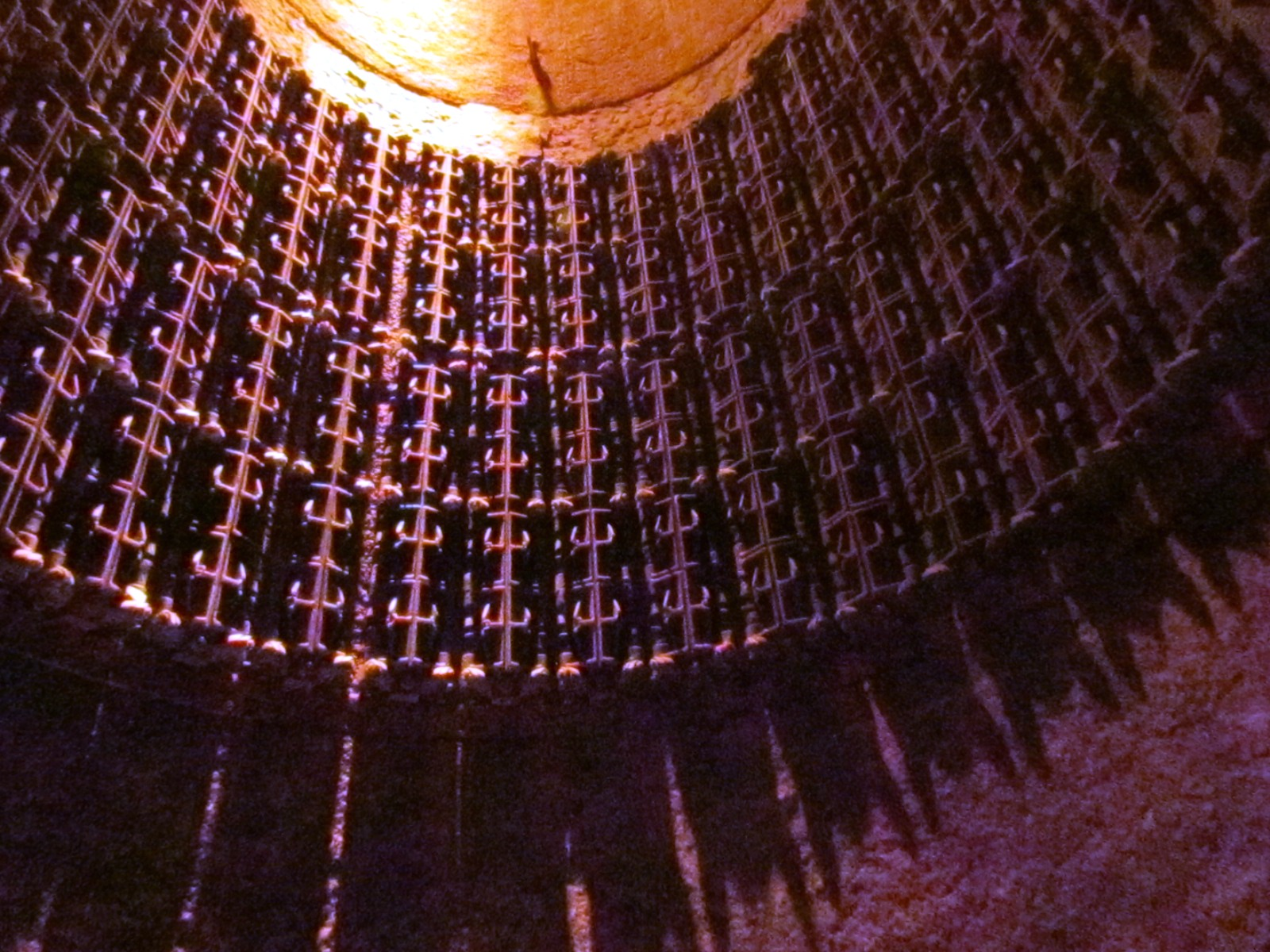
Inside valve section,
Cobdogla

== See also ==
- Hydraulic ram
- Pulsometer pump
