= Armengaud-Lemale gas turbine =

Early experimental gas turbine

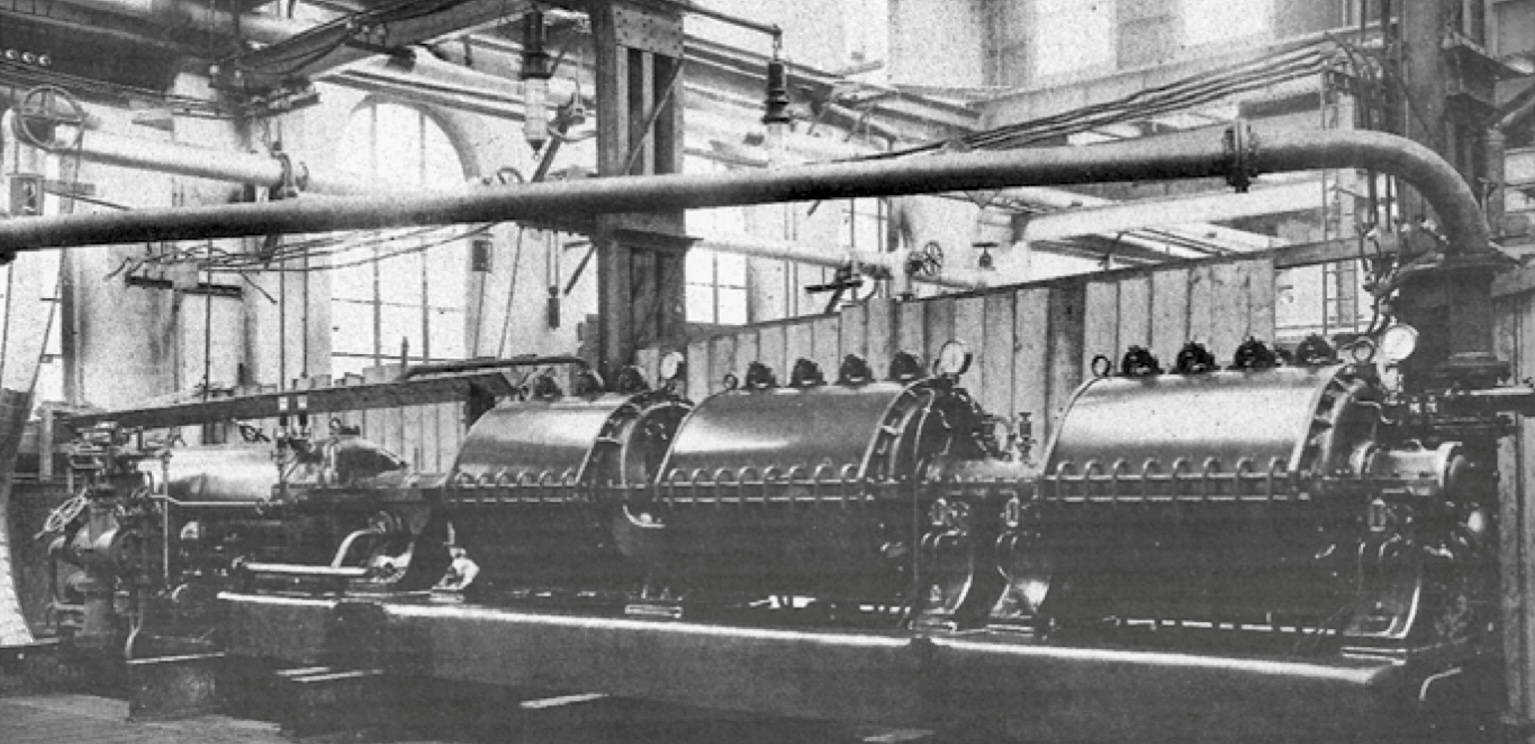
- Armengaud-Lemale gas turbine, Paris 1906
- Classification: Gas turbine
- Application: Experimental
- Fuel source: Kerosene
- Components: Three casings with a total of 25 centrifugal compressor impellers; Silicon carbide lined water cooled combustion chamber. 33 nozzles.; 2 stage curtiss wheel turbine, 37 in (940 mm) diameter.
- Inventor: Rene Armengaud and Charles Lemale
- Invented: 1903–1906

The Armengaud-Lemale gas turbine was an early experimental turbine engine built by the Société Anonyme des Turbomoteurs at their facility in Saint-Denis, Paris during 1906. The machine is named after the society's founders, Rene Armengaud and Charles Lemale.

The 1906 Armengaud-Lemale gas turbine could sustain its own air compression but was too inefficient to produce useful work. Although it was unsuccessful as a gas turbine, the combustion chamber design from the 1906 machine was later used successfully in torpedo engines.

== Design and development ==
In 1901, Charles Lemale obtained a patent for a gas turbine and in 1903 he founded the Société Anonyme des Turbomoteurs with Rene Armengaud. The society proposed a number of new technologies including hollow turbine blades, combustion reheat and compressor stage inter-cooling.

In 1904 the society built a small proof of concept gas turbine. Air was supplied to an oil fueled combustion chamber by a centrifugal compressor at a pressure of 71 psi (4.9 bar). The air fuel mixture was fired by a hot wire with combustion products cooled by water spray. Exhaust gasses were expanded in a nozzle before acting on a modified 25 hp (19 kW) de Laval steam turbine with a 6 in (152 mm) wheel which ran at 20,000 rpm.

In 1906 the society completed a large gas turbine with three gas compressor casings containing a total of 25 centrifugal impellers. The compressors were designed by Auguste Rateau and manufactured by Brown, Boveri & Cie in Switzerland. These were the first of many centrifugal compressors manufactured by Brown, Boveri & Cie.

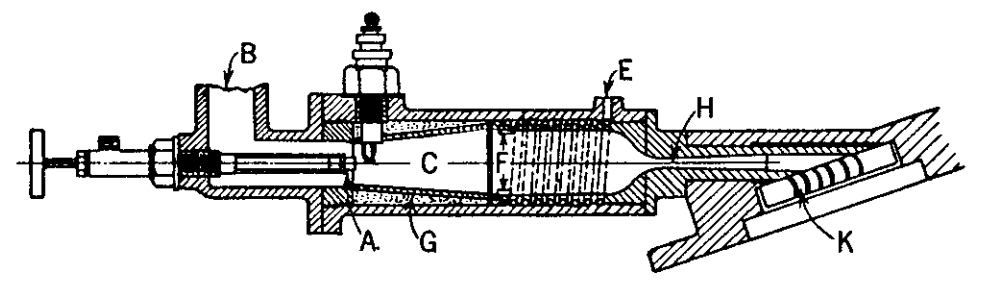
Diagram of the Armengaud-Lemale water cooled combustion chamber: A-Oil enters under pressure and is atomised B-Air inlet C-Combustion chamber E-Cooling water inlet G-Combustion Chamber Housing H-Nozzle K-Turbine wheel

Due to the state of metallurgy in 1906, interstage turbine temperatures had to be kept below 878 °F (470 °C) to avoid damaging turbine wheels. To maintain acceptable temperatures a steady stream of water was injected into the combustion chamber.

Low turbine admission temperatures and the relatively poor efficiency of early centrifugal compressors gave the Armengaud-Lemale gas turbine a low thermal efficiency. In its final form, the Armengaud-Lemale machine was efficient enough to power its own air compressors but could do little else and was not viable as a commercial power source. It was later calculated that to achieve an overall efficiency of just 5% with a compressor efficiency of 68% and a turbine efficiency of 78% would have required a combustion temperature of 1,500 °F (816 °C) which was not possible given the technology available in 1906.

== Further developments ==
Following their work on the Armengaud-Lemale turbine, Brown, Boveri & Cie went onto develop a series of industrial centrifugal compressors and eventually built and tested the world's first gas turbine power station at Neuchâtel, Switzerland in 1939.

The 1906 machine was the last large gas turbine built by the Société Anonyme des Turbomoteurs. The society ceased all work on gas turbines after the death of Rene Armengaud in 1909. The combustion chamber of the 1906 gas turbine was successfully developed, and licensed by the society, for use in naval torpedoes. Kerosene was injected and burned in a compressed air stream increasing the pressure actuating the torpedo's propelling engine. The Armengaud-Lemale combustion chamber was ideal for this application owing to the availability of seawater for cooling.

== Performance ==
Test data published by the Société Anonyme des Turbomoteurs. Run took place with a quoted ambient temperature of 64 °F (18 °C).

- Overall compressor ratio: 3.85
- Compressor discharge temperature: 189 °F (87 °C)
- Combustion temperature: 1,040 °F (560 °C)
- Interstage turbine temperature: 842–878 °F (450–470 °C)
- Exhaust temperature: 788 °F (420 °C)
- Water consumption: 65 cu ft (1.8 m^{3}) per hour
- Fuel consumption: 392 lb (178 kg) per hour
- RPM: 4,250
- Power output: near zero
- Thermal efficiency: 3%
