= Gas-turbine engine =

Type of continuous-flow turbine engine

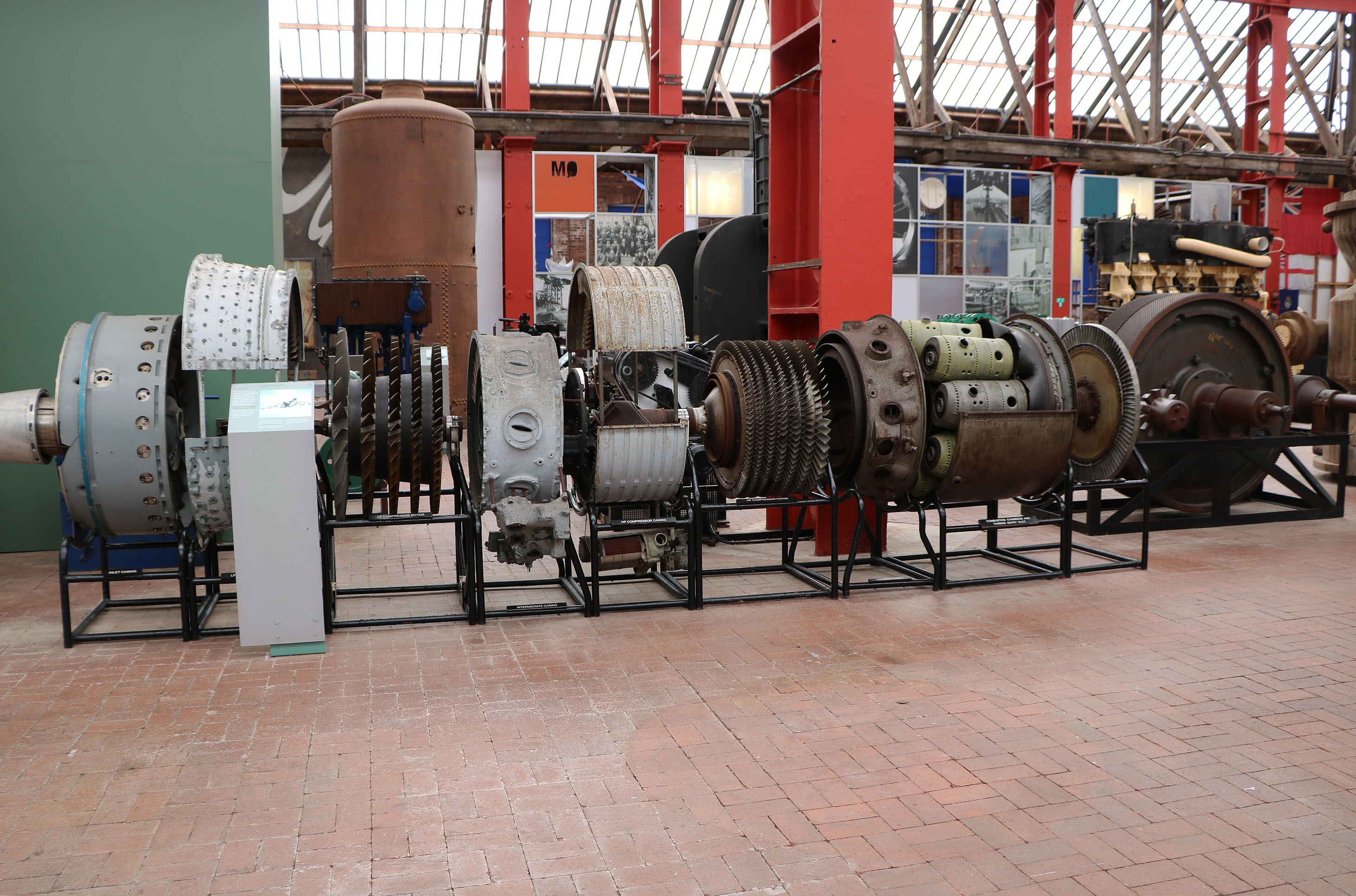
- Rolls-Royce Marine Olympus gas turbine
- Classification: Internal combustion engine
- Application: Aircraft, ships, locomotives electrical generation, petroleum industry, automotive
- Fuel source: Natural gas, jet fuel, diesel or hydrogen
- Components: Compressor; Combustor; Turbine

Examples of gas-turbine configurations: (1) turbojet, (2) turboprop, (3) turboshaft (shown as electric generator), (4) high-bypass turbofan, (5) low-bypass afterburning turbofan

A gas turbine is a complete continuous-flow internal combustion engine in which air is compressed, fuel is burned in the compressed air, and the resulting hot gas expands through a turbine. The turbine shaft drives the compressor and, depending on the design, may also produce thrust, shaft power, or both. The compressor, combustor, and turbine form the gas generator or core of the engine.

Gas turbines of constant pressure combustion operate on the Brayton cycle and are used in aircraft propulsion, electric power generation, marine propulsion, industrial machinery, pumps, gas compressors, and some land vehicles. In aircraft, the same basic engine core may be used in turbojets, turbofans, turboprops, and turboshafts. In industrial and marine service, gas turbines are commonly used as shaft-power engines to drive generators, compressors, pumps, or propellers.

A gas turbine should not be confused with every turbine driven by hot gas. Devices such as turbochargers and power-recovery turbines used in turbo-compound engines contain turbines, but are not gas-turbine engines because they lack the combustor portion of a complete core (compressor, combustor, turbine); instead depending on a separate reciprocating engine as the source of hot gas.

== Timeline of development ==
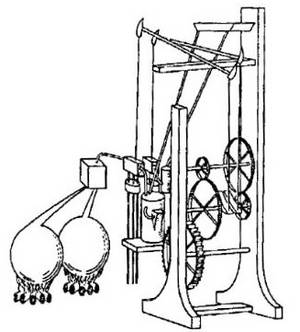
Sketch of John Barber's gas turbine, from his patent

=== Precursors and early concepts ===
- 50: Earliest records of Hero's engine (aeolipile). It most likely served no practical purpose, and was rather more of a curiosity; nonetheless, it demonstrated an important principle of physics that all modern turbine engines rely on.
- 1000: The "Trotting Horse Lamp" (Chinese: 走马灯; pinyin: zǒumǎdēng) was used by the Chinese at lantern fairs as early as the Northern Song dynasty. When the lamp is lit, the heated airflow rises and drives an impeller with horse-riding figures attached on it, whose shadows are then projected onto the outer screen of the lantern.
- 1500: The smoke jack was drawn by Leonardo da Vinci. Hot air from a fire rises through a single-stage axial turbine rotor mounted in the exhaust duct of the fireplace and turns the roasting spit by gear-chain connection.
- 1791: A patent was granted to John Barber, an Englishman, for the first complete gas-turbine design. His design included the main elements of later gas turbines, including air compression, fuel combustion, and expansion of hot gas through a turbine.
- 1894: Sir Charles Parsons patented the idea of propelling a ship with a steam turbine, and built a demonstration vessel, the Turbinia, easily the fastest vessel afloat at the time.
- 1891: American Charles Gordon Curtis patented the first gas-turbine engine in the US.
- 1900: American Sanford Alexander Moss submitted a thesis on gas turbines. In 1903, Moss became an engineer for General Electric's Steam Turbine Department in Lynn, Massachusetts. While there, he applied some of his concepts in the development of the turbocharger.

=== Gas turbine development ===
- 1903: A Norwegian, Ægidius Elling, built the first gas turbine that was able to produce more power than needed to run its own components. Using rotary compressors and turbines it produced 8 kW (11 hp).
- 1904: A gas-turbine engine designed by Franz Stolze, based on his earlier 1873 patent application, is built and tested in Berlin. The Stolze gas turbine was too inefficient to sustain its own operation.
- 1906: The Armengaud–Lemale gas turbine tested in France. This was a relatively large machine which included a 25-stage centrifugal compressor designed by Auguste Rateau and built by the Brown Boveri Company. The gas turbine could sustain its own air compression but was too inefficient to produce useful work.
- 1910: The first operational Holzwarth gas turbine (pulse combustion) achieves an output of 150 kW (200 hp). The designed output of the machine was 750 kW (1,000 hp), and resulted in net efficiencies up to 18% at 550 °C (1,000 °F) and 26% at 800 °C (1,500 °F) gas temperatures at turbine inlet but were below contemporary diesel reciprocating engine efficiency: 30% .
- 1920s: The practical theory of gas flow through passages was developed into the more formal (and applicable to turbines) theory of gas flow past airfoils by A. A. Griffith, resulting in the publication in 1926 of An Aerodynamic Theory of Turbine Design. Working testbed designs of axial turbines suitable for driving a propeller were developed by the Royal Aeronautical Establishment.
- 1930: Having found no interest from the RAF for his idea, Frank Whittle patented the design for a centrifugal gas turbine for jet propulsion. The first successful test run of his engine occurred in England in April 1937.
- 1932: The Brown Boveri Company of Switzerland starts selling axial compressor and turbine turbosets as part of the turbocharged steam generating Velox boiler. Following the gas-turbine principle, the steam evaporation tubes are arranged within the gas-turbine combustion chamber; the first Velox plant is erected at a French steel mill in Mondeville, Calvados.
- 1936: The first constant-flow industrial gas turbine is commissioned by the Brown Boveri Company and goes into service at Sun Oil's Marcus Hook refinery in Pennsylvania, US.
- 1937: Working proof-of-concept prototype turbojet engine runs in the UK (Frank Whittle's) and Germany (Hans von Ohain's Heinkel HeS 1). Henry Tizard secures UK government funding for further development of Power Jets engine.
- 1939: The First 4 MW utility power generation gas turbine is built by the Brown Boveri Company for an emergency power station in Neuchâtel, Switzerland. The turbojet-powered Heinkel He 178, the world's first jet aircraft, makes its first flight.
- 1940: Jendrassik Cs-1, a turboprop engine, made its first bench run. The Cs-1 was designed by Hungarian engineer György Jendrassik, and was intended to power a Hungarian twin-engine heavy fighter, the RMI-1. Work on the Cs-1 stopped in 1941 without the type having powered any aircraft.
- 1944: Volume production of the Junkers Jumo 004 turbojet begins. The engine-powered operational German jet aircraft included the Messerschmitt Me 262 fighter and Arado Ar 234 reconnaissance bomber.
- 1946: National Gas Turbine Establishment formed from Power Jets and the RAE turbine division to bring together Whittle and Hayne Constant's work. In Beznau, Switzerland the first commercial reheated/recuperated unit generating 27 MW was commissioned.
- 1947: A Metropolitan Vickers G1 (Gatric) becomes the first marine gas turbine when it completes sea trials on the Royal Navy's M.G.B. 2009 vessel. The Gatric was an aeroderivative gas turbine based on the Metropolitan Vickers F2 jet engine.
- 1995: Siemens becomes the first manufacturer of large electricity producing gas turbines to incorporate single crystal turbine blade technology into their production models, allowing higher operating temperatures and greater efficiency.
- 2011: Mitsubishi Heavy Industries tests the first >60% efficiency combined cycle gas turbine (the M501J) at its Takasago, Hyōgo, works.
- 2020: The General Electric GE9X, a high-bypass turbofan using advanced materials including ceramic matrix composite hot-section components, receives Federal Aviation Administration certification.
- 2024: Siemens Energy's SGT5-9000HL gas turbine at Keadby 2 Power Station in North Lincolnshire, United Kingdom, was recognized by Guinness World Records after achieving 64.18% combined cycle efficiency, making it the world's most efficient combined-cycle power plant as of 2026.
- 2025: Mitsubishi Power and Georgia Power complete a 50% hydrogen fuel-blend test on an M501GAC gas turbine at Plant McDonough-Atkinson in the United States.

== Theory of operation ==
The Brayton cycle

Gas turbine engines can use either constant pressure or constant volume combustion.

=== Constant Volume Combustion (CVC) ===
CVC is not widely used but can reach thermal efficiencies up to 40% using compressor pressure ratios between 5 and 20 and the Humphrey or Brayton cycles.

=== Constant Pressure Combustion ===
Constant pressure combustion uses the Brayton cycle and can further be broke down into two types:

- Open-cycle gas turbines allow air to flow continuously through the compressor, combustor, and turbine and the exhaust is discharged to the surroundings rather than recirculated, so the heat-rejection step is an idealized representation of the exhaust being replaced by fresh intake air.
- Closed-cycle gas turbines recirculate the exhaust to preheat air entering the combustion chamber and improve thermal efficiency up to 50-60% using compressor pressure ratios between 15 and 25 under compressor inlet temperature of 285 K and turbine inlet temperature of 1500 K conditions.

=== Cycles ===
The ideal Brayton cycle, also referred to as the Joule cycle, is used to model gas-turbine engines, the working fluid undergoes four processes:

1. isentropic compression – incoming air (ambient or in combination with recirculated) is drawn into the compressor by shaft work, where pressurize and temperature are increased.
2. constant-pressure heat addition – the compressed air passes through a combustion chamber where fuel is burned, further heating that air in a constant-pressure process, since the chamber is open to allow airflow in and out.
3. isentropic expansion – the heated, pressurized air gives up its energy, expanding through a turbine (or series of turbines). Part of this shaft work drives the compressor while the remaining energy may be used to produce jet thrust, drive a fan, drive a propeller through reduction gearing, or power a rotor, accessory gearbox, industrial load, or electrical generator.
4. constant-pressure – heat rejection.

Real compressors, combustors, and turbines depart from the ideal Brayton cycle because of friction, turbulence, pressure losses, heat transfer, and other irreversible effects.

=== Component architecture ===
Air is taken in by a compressor, which may use an axial, centrifugal, mixed-flow, or combined design. The compressed air is then ducted into the combustor, which may use an annular, can, or can-annular design. The combustor adds heat to the compressed air by burning fuel in the flow, while part of the compressor air is also used for flame control, dilution, and cooling of combustor and turbine components. The resulting hot gas expands through the turbine, which extracts work from the flow.

The compressor, combustor, and compressor-driving turbine together form the core of the engine, also known as the gas generator, because their output is hot, high-energy gas.

=== Propulsion types ===
In a turboshaft, the engine has an additional power shaft to drive an industrial generator, helicopter rotor, marine propeller, fan, or other load, and are designed to have a larger share of the flow energy extracted as shaft work rather than thrust. In a free-turbine turboshaft, the turbine and power shaft are mechanically independent of the combustor.

In a turbofan, the turbine extracts additional work to drive the fan, while some remaining exhaust energy may still contribute to jet thrust.

In a turboprop, most of the useful propulsive power is delivered through the propeller; in a typical turboprop engine, the propeller produces roughly 90 percent of the total thrust under sea-level standard-day conditions.

In a turbojet engine, only enough energy is extracted from the flow to drive the compressor and other engine components; the remaining gas energy is accelerated through a nozzle to provide the jet that propels the aircraft.

=== Operating rpm ===
The smaller the engine, the higher the rotation rate of the shaft must be to attain the required blade tip speed. Blade-tip speed is one of the factors that affects the pressure ratios that can be obtained by the turbine and the compressor, along with blade aerodynamics, stage count, material limits, and component efficiency. These factors affect the maximum power and efficiency that can be obtained by the engine. For the tip speed to remain constant, if the diameter of a rotor is reduced by half, the rotational speed must double. For example, large jet engines operate around 10,000–25,000 rpm, while micro turbines may spin as fast as 500,000 rpm.

=== Complexity ===
Mechanically, gas turbines can be less complex than some reciprocating engines because a simple gas turbine may have one main rotating assembly, the compressor/shaft/turbine rotor, with the only other moving parts being in the fuel and accessory systems. This can reduce manufacturing costs and assembly time in a few cases. For instance in the 1940s, costing 10,000 ℛℳ for materials, the Jumo 004 proved cheaper than the Junkers 213 piston engine, which was 35,000 ℛℳ,The assembly time (including manufacture, assembly, and shipping) of the Jumo 004 required only 375 hours of lower-skill labor to complete compared to 1,400 for the BMW 801 piston engine. While simpler and swifter to produce at the time, early production turbojets came with poor efficiency and reliability as compared to piston engines.

Historical low moving-part count of a simple gas turbine does not necessarily make it easier to manufacture than a simple piston engine. Modern gas turbines can operate at high rotational speeds (up to 500,000 rpm) and high gas temperatures (1500 K) in the combustor, requiring precise blade shapes, small clearances, careful rotor balance to ISO 1940, and exotic, heat-resistant materials. Modern, advanced gas turbofan engines or combined-cycle power-plant turbines, may have two or three shafts (spools), many rows of compressor and turbine blades, variable stator vanes, and extensive fuel, oil, air, cooling, and control systems. For example, the Rolls-Royce Trent XWB is a three-shaft turbofan with separate low-, intermediate-, and high-pressure systems, an 8-stage intermediate-pressure compressor, a 6-stage high-pressure compressor, single-stage high-pressure turbine, 2-stage intermediate-pressure turbine, 6-stage low-pressure turbine, and dual-channel FADEC.

=== Power to weight ratio ===
A major advantage of gas-turbine engines, especially in aircraft and other applications requiring high sustained power, is their high power-to-weight ratio. The Federal Aviation Administration notes that turboprop engines develop more power per pound of weight than reciprocating engines in the 180–350 mph cruise-speed range. Because significant useful work can be generated by a relatively lightweight engine, gas turbines are well-suited to aircraft that require high power output, high speed, or sustained operation at altitude.

=== Bearings ===
Thrust bearings and journal bearings are a critical part of a design. They are hydrodynamic oil bearings or oil-cooled rolling-element bearings. Foil bearings are used in some small machines such as micro turbines and also have strong potential for use in small gas turbines/auxiliary power units.

=== Creep ===
A major challenge facing turbine design, especially turbine blades, is reducing creep induced by the high temperatures and stresses experienced during operation. Higher operating temperatures are continuously sought to increase efficiency, but come at the cost of higher creep rates. To achieve optimal performance while limiting creep, designers employ several technology methods:

- high performance thermal barrier coatings (TBC's)
- and single crystal superalloys substrate

These technology methods limit deformation by targeting broadly classified deformation mechanisms:

- dislocation glide
- dislocation climb
- diffusional flow

TBC's provide thermal insulation of the blade while also offering oxidation and corrosion resistance. TBC's are often stabilized zirconium dioxide-based ceramics.

To both improve adherence of the TBC to the substrate and substrate oxidation resistance, bond coats can be directly applied onto the surface of the substrate using pack carburization. The Al from the bond coats forms Al_{2}O_{3} on the TBC-bond coat interface, which provides the oxidation resistance, but also results in the formation of an undesirable inter-diffusion (ID) zone between itself and the substrate. The oxidation resistance outweighs drawbacks associated with the ID zone as it increases the lifetime of the blade and limits the efficiency losses caused by oxidation buildup on the outside of the blades. Oxidation/corrosion resistant coatings (bond coats) typically consist of aluminides or MCrAlY (where M is typically Fe and/or Co) alloys. Using TBCs limits the temperature exposure of the superalloy substrate, thereby decreasing the diffusivity of the active species (typically vacancies) within the alloy and reducing dislocation and vacancy creep. It has been found that a coating of 1–200 μm can decrease internal blade temperatures by up to 200 °C (392 °F).

Nickel-based superalloy substrates improve strength and creep resistance due to their composition and resultant microstructure. The gamma (γ) face centered cubic (FCC) nickel is alloyed with aluminum and titanium to precipitate a uniform dispersion of the coherent Ni_{3}(Al,Ti) gamma-prime (γ') phases. The finely dispersed γ' precipitates impede dislocation motion and increase the stress required for creep onset. Furthermore, γ' is an ordered L1_{2} phase that makes it harder for dislocations to shear past it. Further Refractory elements such as rhenium and ruthenium can be added in solid solution to improve creep strength. The addition of these elements reduces the diffusion of the gamma prime phase, thus preserving the fatigue resistance, strength, and creep resistance.

Single-crystal nickel-based superalloys lack grain boundaries, eliminating Coble creep, leading to significant improvements in creep resistance and to decreased creep rate. Compared to multicrystalline alloys, single crystals have lower creep at high temperature and significantly lower yield strength at room temperature, where yield strength is determined by the Hall–Petch relationship. Care needs to be taken to optimize the design parameters to limit high-temperature creep while not decreasing low-temperature yield strength.

== Applications ==
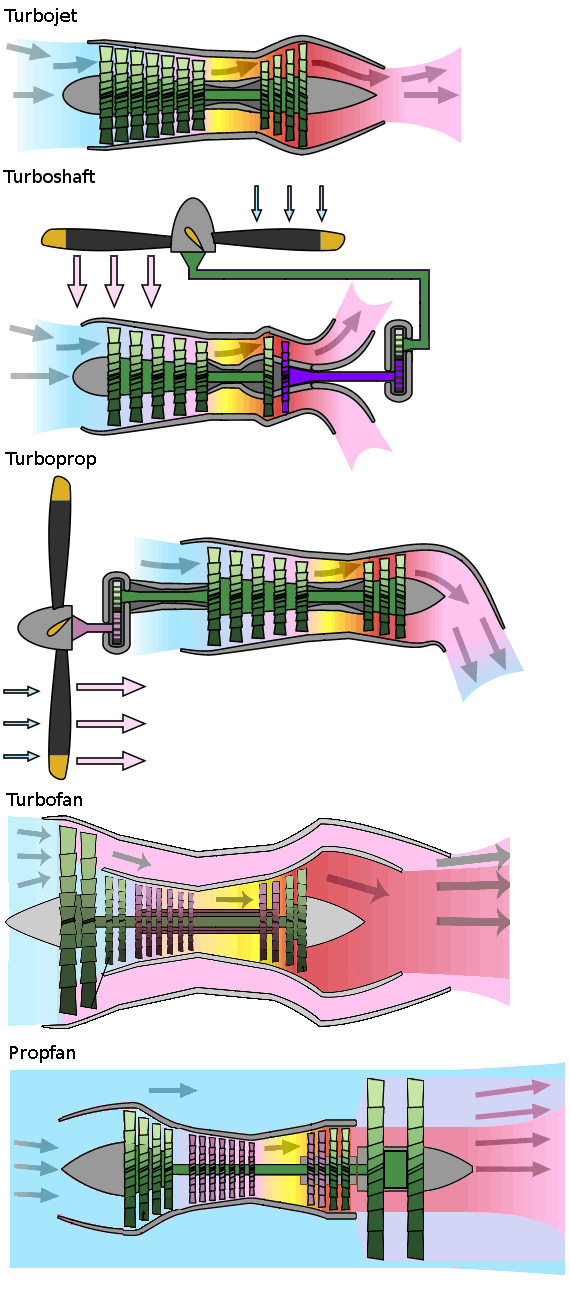
Jet engine types

=== Jet engines ===
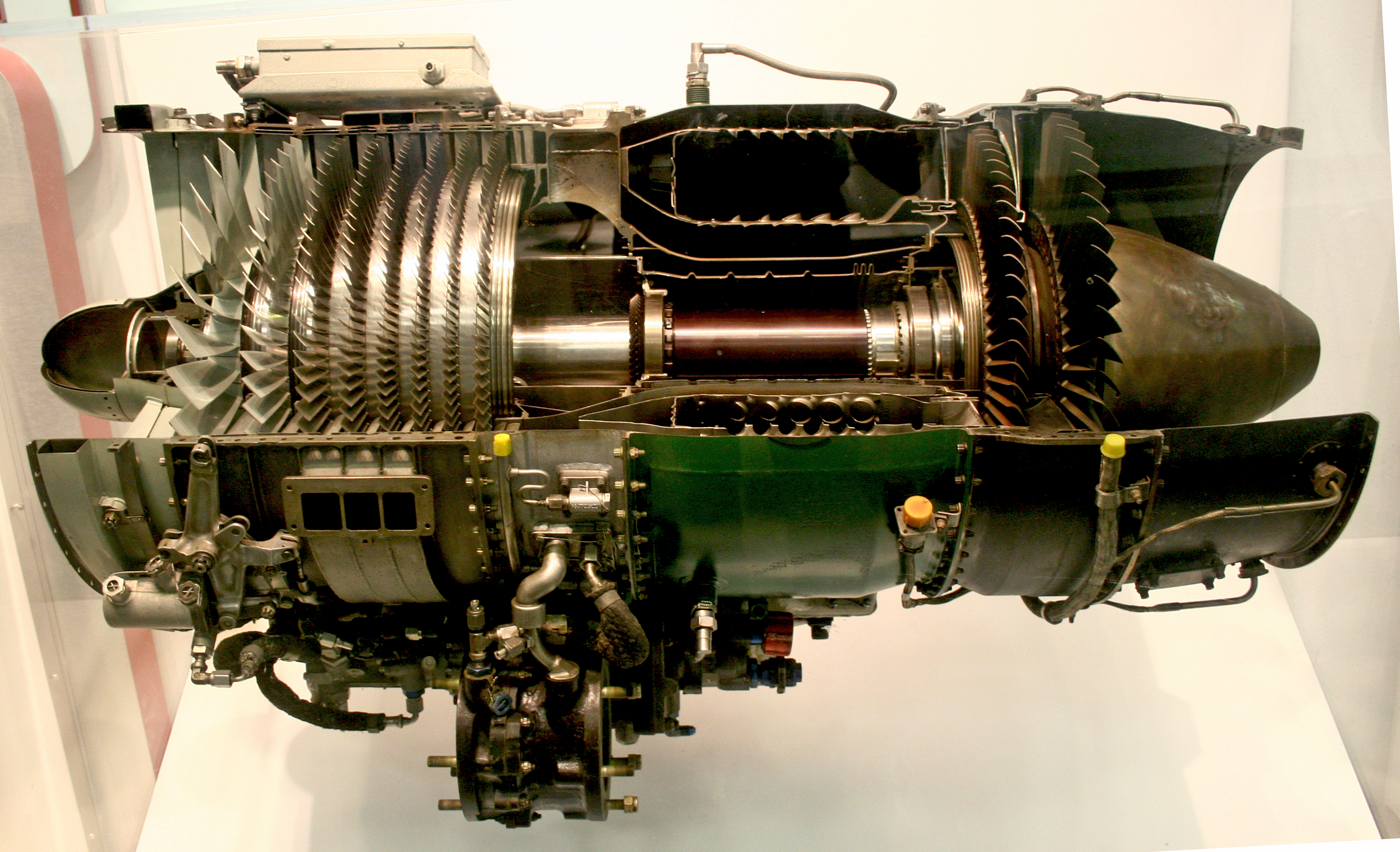
Typical axial-flow gas-turbine turbojet, the J85, sectioned for display. Flow is left to right, multistage compressor on left, combustion chambers center, two-stage turbine on right.

Airbreathing jet engines are gas turbines optimized to produce thrust from the exhaust gases, or from ducted fans connected to the gas turbines. Jet engines that produce thrust from the direct impulse of exhaust gases are often called turbojets. While still in service with many militaries and civilian operators, turbojets have mostly been phased out in favor of the turbofan engine due to the turbojet's low fuel efficiency and high noise. Those that generate thrust with the addition of a ducted fan are called turbofans or (rarely) fan-jets. These engines produce nearly 80% of their thrust by the ducted fan, which can be seen from the front of the engine. They come in two types, low-bypass turbofan and high bypass, the difference being the amount of air moved by the fan, called "bypass air". These engines offer the benefit of more thrust without extra fuel consumption.

=== Turboprop engines ===
A turboprop engine is a turbine engine that drives an aircraft propeller using a reduction gear to translate high turbine section operating speed (often in the 10s of thousands) into low thousands necessary for efficient propeller operation. The benefit of using the turboprop engine is to take advantage of the turbine engine's high power-to-weight ratio to drive a propeller, thus allowing a more powerful, but also smaller engine to be used. Turboprop engines are used on a wide range of business aircraft such as the Pilatus PC-12, commuter aircraft such as the Beechcraft 1900, and small cargo aircraft such as the Cessna 208 Caravan or De Havilland Canada Dash 8, and large aircraft (typically military) such as the Airbus A400M transport, Lockheed AC-130 and Tupolev Tu-95 strategic bomber. While military turboprop engines can vary, in the civilian market there are two primary engines to be found: the Pratt & Whitney Canada PT6, a free-turbine turboshaft engine, and the Honeywell TPE331, a fixed turbine engine (formerly designated as the Garrett AiResearch 331).

=== Aeroderivative gas turbines (industrial turboshafts) ===
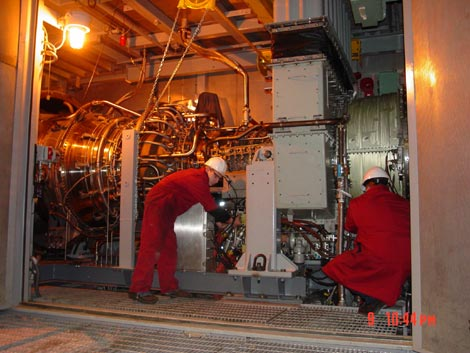
An LM6000 in an electrical power plant application

Aeroderivative gas turbines are generally based on existing aircraft gas-turbine engines and are smaller and lighter than industrial gas turbines.

Aeroderivatives are used in electrical power generation due to their ability to be shut down and handle load changes more quickly than industrial machines. They are also used in the marine industry to reduce weight. Common types include the General Electric LM2500, General Electric LM6000, and aeroderivative versions of the Pratt & Whitney PW4000, Pratt & Whitney FT4 and Rolls-Royce RB211.

Aeroderivatives may also be conversions of operating aircraft engines. FTAI Aviation in 2026 announced plans to rebuild 100 CFM International CFM56 annually into 25-megawatt power turbines.

=== Amateur gas turbines ===
Increasing numbers of gas turbines are being used or even constructed by amateurs.

In its most straightforward form, these are commercial turbines acquired through military surplus or scrapyard sales, then operated for display as part of the hobby of engine collecting. In its most extreme form, amateurs have even rebuilt engines beyond professional repair and then used them to compete for the land speed record.

The simplest form of self-constructed gas turbine employs an automotive turbocharger as the core component. A combustion chamber is fabricated and plumbed between the compressor and turbine sections.

More sophisticated turbojets are also built, where their thrust and light weight are sufficient to power large model aircraft. The Schreckling design constructs the entire engine from raw materials, including the fabrication of a centrifugal compressor wheel from plywood, epoxy and wrapped carbon fibre strands.

Several small companies now manufacture small turbines and parts for the amateur. Most turbojet-powered model aircraft are now using these commercial and semi-commercial microturbines, rather than a Schreckling-like home-build.

=== Auxiliary power units ===
Small gas turbines are used as auxiliary power units (APUs) to supply auxiliary power to larger, mobile machines such as an aircraft, and are a turboshaft design. They supply:

- compressed air for air-cycle-machine-style air conditioning and ventilation,
- compressed-air start-up power for larger jet engines,
- mechanical (shaft) power to a gearbox to drive shafted accessories, and
- electrical, hydraulic, and other power-transmission sources to consuming devices remote from the APU.

=== Industrial gas turbines for power generation ===
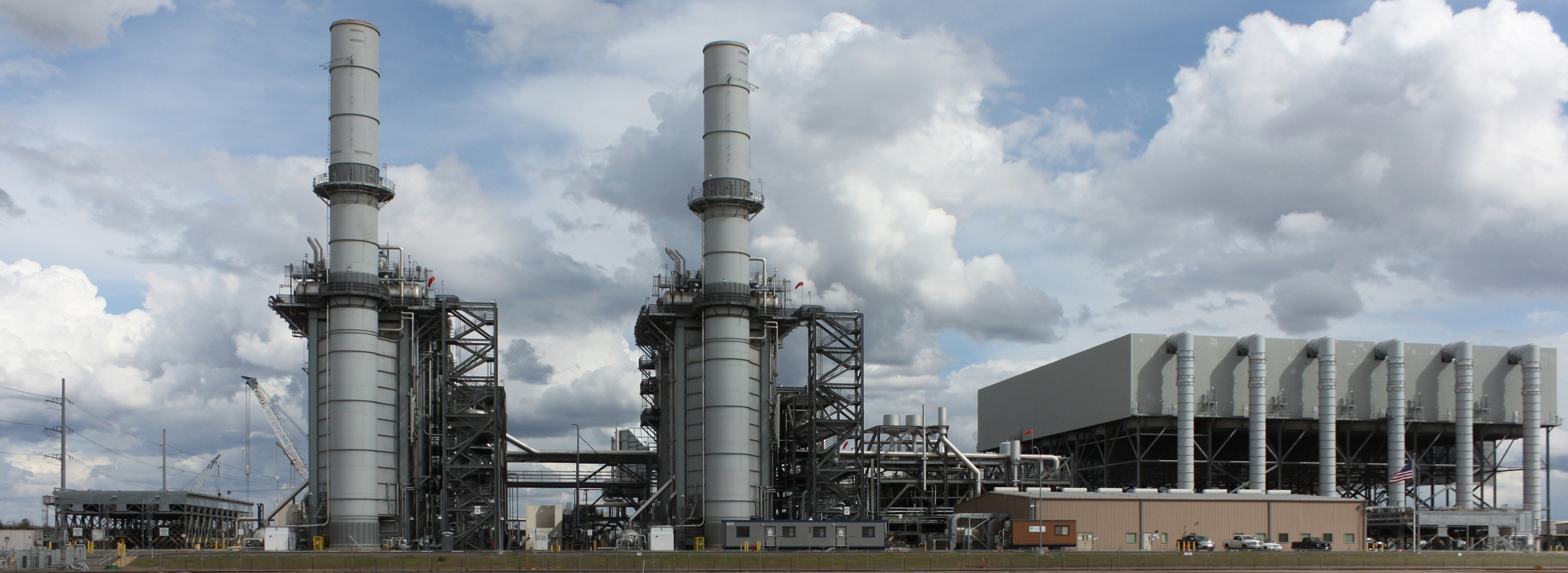
Gateway Generating Station, a combined-cycle gas-fired power station in California, uses two GE 7F.04 combustion turbines to burn natural gas.

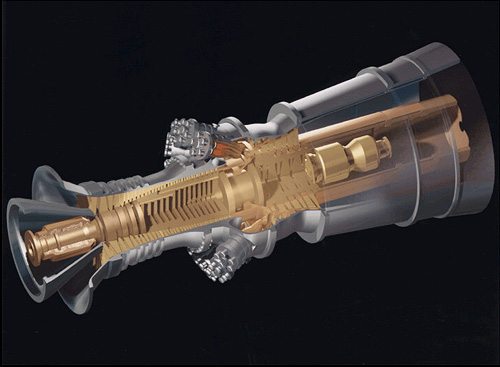
GE H series power generation gas turbine: In combined-cycle configuration, its highest thermodynamic efficiency is 62.22%.

Industrial gas turbines differ from aeronautical designs in that the frames, bearings, and blading are of heavier construction. They are also much more closely integrated with the devices they power—often an electric generator—and the secondary-energy equipment that is used to recover residual energy (largely heat).

They range in size from portable mobile plants to large, complex systems weighing more than a hundred tonnes housed in purpose-built buildings. When the gas turbine is used solely for shaft power, its thermal efficiency is about 30%. However, it may be cheaper to buy electricity than to generate it. Therefore, many engines are used in CHP (Combined Heat and Power) configurations that can be small enough to be integrated into portable container configurations.

Gas turbines can be particularly efficient when waste heat from the turbine is recovered by a heat recovery steam generator (HRSG) to power a conventional steam turbine in a combined cycle configuration. The 605 MW General Electric 9HA achieved a 62.22% efficiency rate with temperatures as high as 1,540 °C (2,800 °F). For 2018, GE offers its 826 MW HA at over 64% efficiency in combined cycle due to advances in additive manufacturing and combustion breakthroughs, up from 63.7% in 2017 orders and on track to achieve 65% by the early 2020s. In March 2018, GE Power achieved a 63.08% gross efficiency for its 7HA turbine.

Aeroderivative gas turbines can also be used in combined cycles, leading to a higher efficiency, but it will not be as high as a specifically designed industrial gas turbine. They can also be run in a cogeneration configuration: the exhaust is used for space or water heating, or drives an absorption chiller for cooling the inlet air and increasing the power output, a technology known as turbine inlet air cooling.

Another significant advantage is their ability to be turned on and off within minutes, supplying power during peak or unscheduled demand. Since single-cycle (gas turbine only) power plants are less efficient than combined cycle plants, they are usually used as peaking power plants, which operate anywhere from several hours per day to a few dozen hours per year—depending on the electricity demand and the generating capacity of the region. In areas with a shortage of base-load and load following power plant capacity or with low fuel costs, a gas-turbine power plant may regularly operate most hours of the day. A large single-cycle gas turbine typically produces 100 to 400 megawatts of electric power and has 35–40% thermodynamic efficiency.

=== Industrial gas turbines for mechanical drive ===
Industrial gas turbines that are used solely for mechanical drive or used in collaboration with a recovery steam generator differ from power generating sets in that they are often smaller and feature a dual shaft design as opposed to a single shaft. The power range varies from 1 megawatt up to 50 megawatts. These engines are connected directly or via a gearbox to either a pump or compressor assembly. The majority of installations are used within the oil and gas industries. Mechanical drive applications increase efficiency by around 2%.

Oil and gas platforms require these engines to drive compressors to inject gas into the wells to force oil up via another bore, or to compress the gas for transportation. They are also often used to provide power for the platform. These platforms do not need to use the engine in collaboration with a CHP system due to getting the gas at an extremely reduced cost (often free from burn off gas). The same companies use pump sets to drive the fluids to land and across pipelines in various intervals.

==== Compressed-air energy storage ====
One modern development seeks to improve efficiency in another way, by separating the compressor and the turbine with a compressed-air store. In a conventional turbine, up to half the generated power is used driving the compressor. In a compressed-air energy storage configuration, power is used to drive the compressor, and the compressed air is released to operate the turbine when required.

=== Turboshaft engines ===
Turboshaft engines are used to drive compressors in gas pumping stations and natural gas liquefaction plants. They are also used in aviation to power all but the smallest modern helicopters, and function as an auxiliary power unit in large commercial aircraft. A primary shaft carries the compressor and its turbine, which, together with a combustor, is called a gas generator. A separately spinning power turbine is usually used to drive the rotor on helicopters. Allowing the gas generator and power turbine/rotor to spin at their own speeds allows more flexibility in their design.

=== Scale jet engine ===
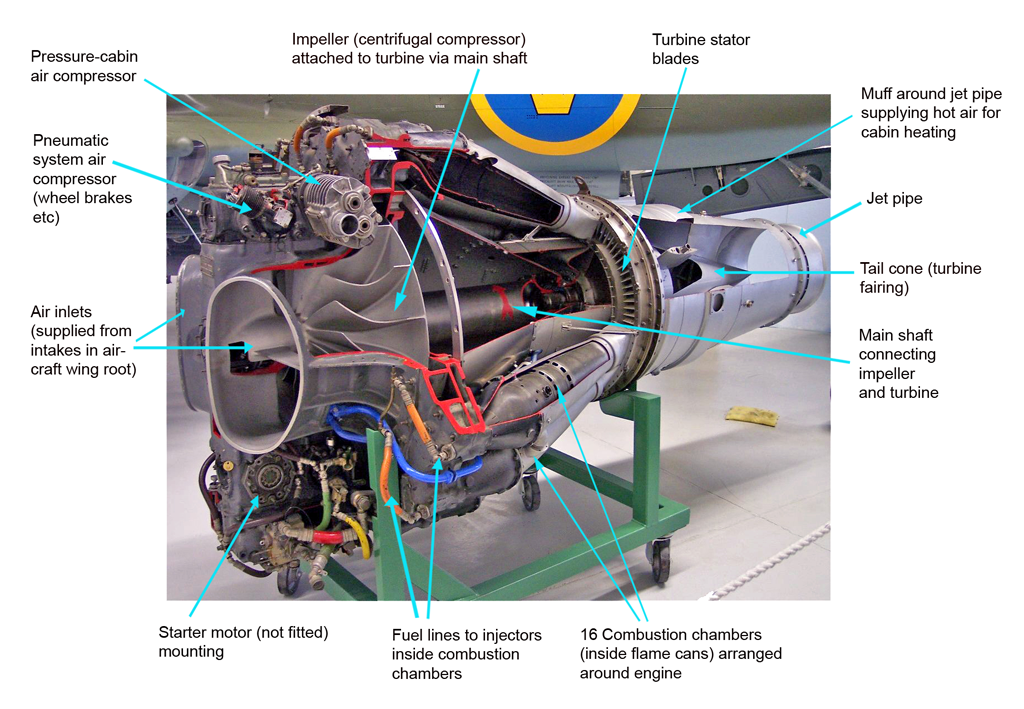
Scale jet engines are scaled-down versions of this early full-scale engine.

A typical scale-jet engine, or miniature gas turbine or micro-jet, uses a centrifugal compressor.

The pioneer of modern micro-jets, Kurt Schreckling, produced one of the world's first micro-turbines, the FD3/67. This engine can produce up to 22 newtons of thrust and can be built by most mechanically minded people with basic engineering tools, such as a metal lathe.

=== Microturbines ===
Evolved from piston engine turbochargers, aircraft APUs or small jet engines, microturbines are 25 to 500 kilowatt turbines the size of a refrigerator. Microturbines have around 15% efficiencies without a recuperator, or 20 to 30% with one, and they can reach 85% combined thermal–electrical efficiency in cogeneration.

== External combustion ==
Most gas turbines are internal combustion engines, but it is also possible to manufacture an external combustion gas turbine, which is, effectively, a turbine version of a hot-air engine. Those systems are usually indicated as EFGT (externally-fired gas turbine) or IFGT (indirectly-fired gas turbine).

External combustion can use pulverized coal or finely ground biomass (such as sawdust) as a fuel. In an IFGT, a heat exchanger is used, and only clean air with no combustion products travels through the power turbine. The thermal efficiency is lower in the indirect type of external combustion; however, the turbine blades are not subjected to combustion products, and much lower quality (and therefore cheaper) fuels are able to be used.

When external combustion is used, it is possible to use exhaust air from the turbine as the primary combustion air. This effectively reduces global heat losses, although heat losses associated with the combustion exhaust remain inevitable.

Closed-cycle gas turbines based on helium or supercritical carbon dioxide also hold promise for use with future high-temperature solar and nuclear power generation.

== Surface vehicle applications ==
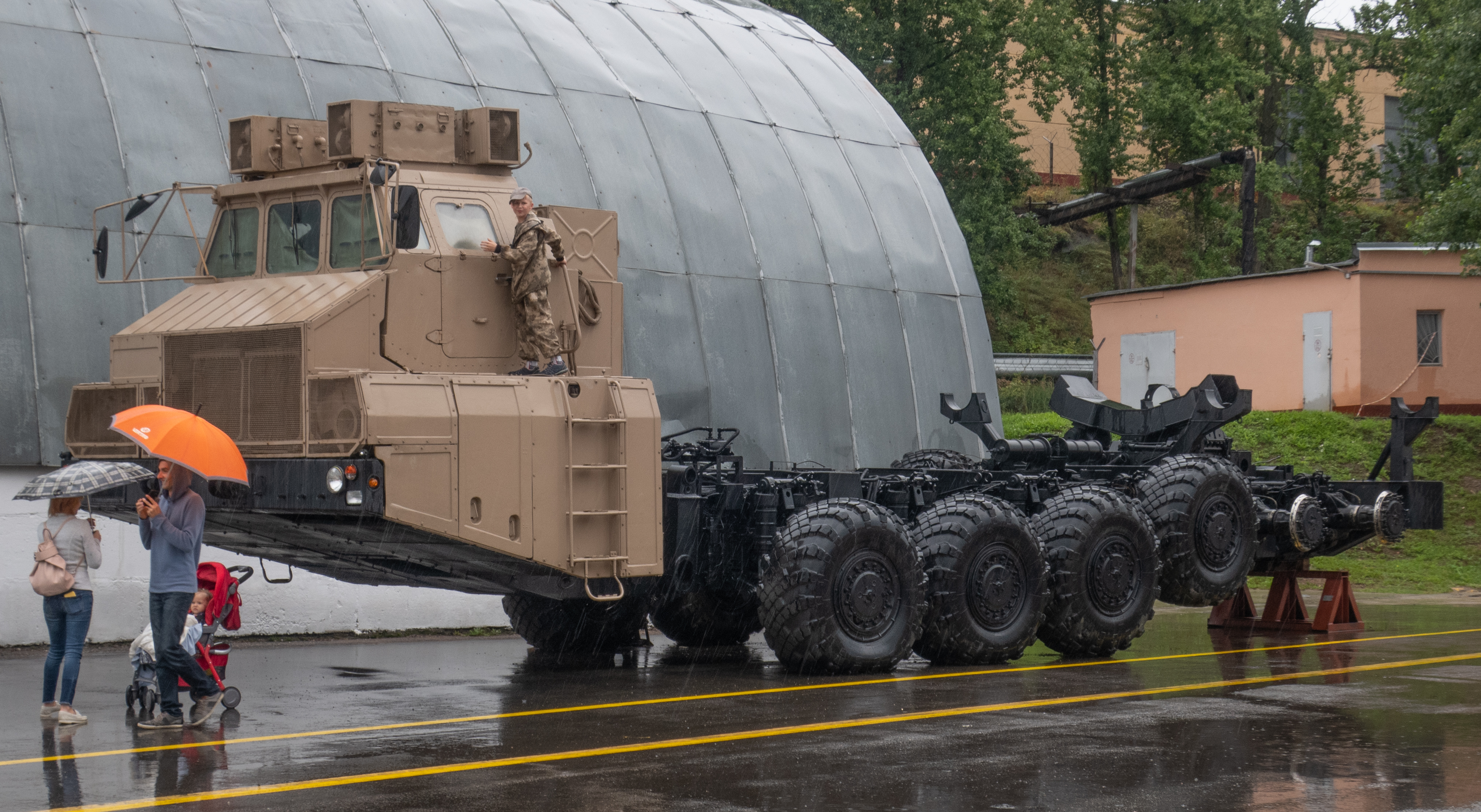
MAZ-7907, a transporter erector launcher with a turbine–electric powertrain

Gas turbines have been used in some ships, locomotives, tanks, experimental cars, buses, and motorcycles. In surface vehicles, a gas turbine may be used either as a direct mechanical prime mover or as a generator in a series hybrid or turbine-electric powertrain.

A key advantage of gas turbines in aircraft—their ability to maintain performance at high altitude compared with piston engines, particularly naturally aspirated ones—is generally irrelevant in surface vehicles. Their high power-to-weight ratio and compact size can still be useful, especially in military vehicles, marine propulsion, and specialized heavy vehicles.

Gas turbines offer high power from a relatively small and light engine, but they have disadvantages in many road-vehicle applications. They are typically less responsive and less efficient than piston engines over the wide range of speeds and loads required in normal driving. In series hybrid vehicles, these problems are reduced because the turbine can run mainly as a generator at a more efficient operating point, while batteries or ultracapacitors supply transient power demand. A continuously variable transmission can also reduce, but not eliminate, the mismatch between turbine operation and road-vehicle drive requirements.

Small gas turbines have historically been more expensive to produce than piston engines, partly because piston engines have been mass-produced in much larger numbers. Although turbochargers and turbo-compound engines also use exhaust-driven turbines, they are not gas-turbine surface vehicles. A turbocharger is an exhaust-driven turbine and compressor used to boost a reciprocating engine, while a turbo-compound engine is a reciprocating engine with power-recovery turbines in its exhaust system.

=== Passenger road vehicles (cars, bikes, and buses) ===
A number of experiments have been conducted with gas-turbine-powered automobiles, the largest by Chrysler. More recently, there has been some interest in the use of turbine engines for hybrid electric cars. In 2012 a micro-gas-turbine manufacturer, Bladon Jets, secured investments to develop an Ultra Lightweight Range Extender (ULRE) for electric vehicles.

==== Concept cars ====
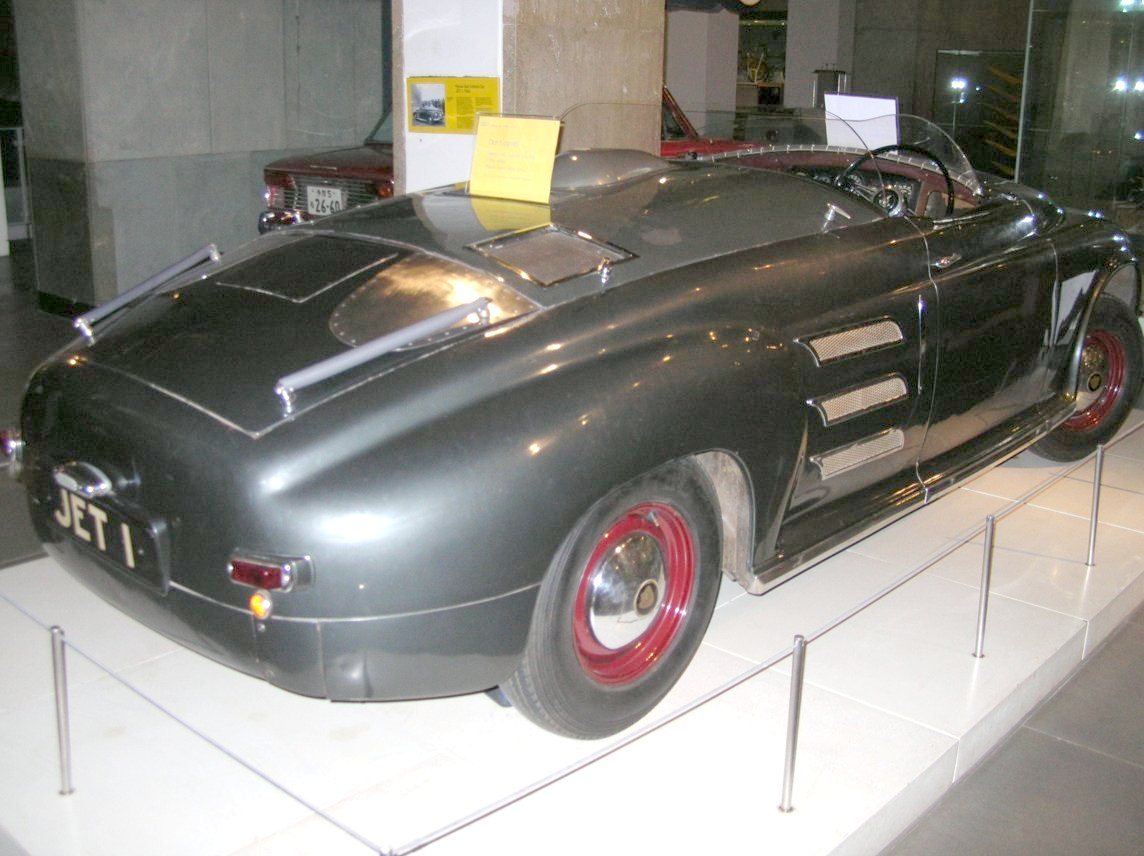
The 1950 Rover JET1

The first serious investigation of using a gas turbine in cars was in 1946, when two engineers, Robert Kafka and Robert Engerstein of Carney Associates, a New York engineering firm, came up with the concept where a unique compact turbine engine design would provide power for a rear-wheel drive car. After an article appeared in Popular Science, there was no further work, beyond the paper stage.

Early concepts (1950s/60s)

In 1950, designer F.R. Bell and Chief Engineer Maurice Wilks from British car manufacturers Rover unveiled the first car powered with a gas-turbine engine. The two-seater JET1 had the engine positioned behind the seats, air intake grilles on either side of the car, and exhaust outlets on the top of the tail. During tests, the car reached top speeds of 140 km/h (87 mph), at a turbine speed of 50,000 rpm. After being shown in the United Kingdom and the United States in 1950, JET1 was further developed, and was subjected to speed trials on the Jabbeke highway in Belgium in June 1952, where it exceeded 240 km/h (150 mph). The car ran on petrol, paraffin (kerosene) or diesel oil, but fuel consumption problems proved insurmountable for a production car. JET1 is on display at the London Science Museum.

A French turbine-powered car, the SOCEMA-Grégoire, was displayed at the October 1952 Paris Auto Show. It was designed by the French engineer Jean-Albert Grégoire.

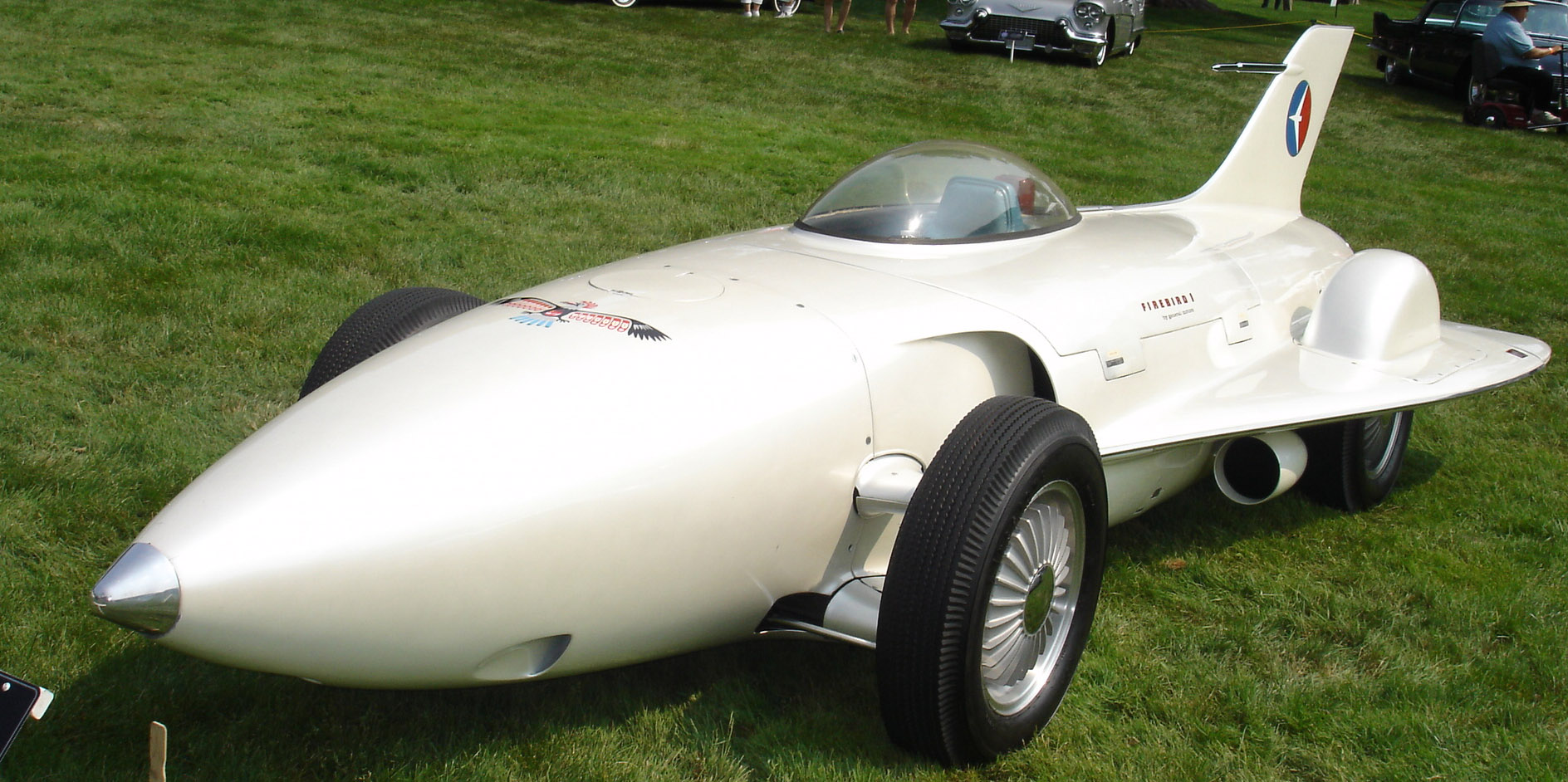
GM Firebird I

The first turbine-powered car built in the US was the GM Firebird I, which began evaluations in 1953. While photos of the Firebird, I may suggest that the jet turbine's thrust propelled the car like an aircraft, the turbine actually drove the rear wheels. The Firebird I was never meant to be a commercial passenger car and was built solely for testing & evaluation as well as public relations purposes. Additional Firebird concept cars, each powered by gas turbines, were developed for the 1953, 1956, and 1959 Motorama auto shows. The GM Research gas-turbine engine was also fitted to a series of transit buses, starting with the Turbo-Cruiser I of 1953.

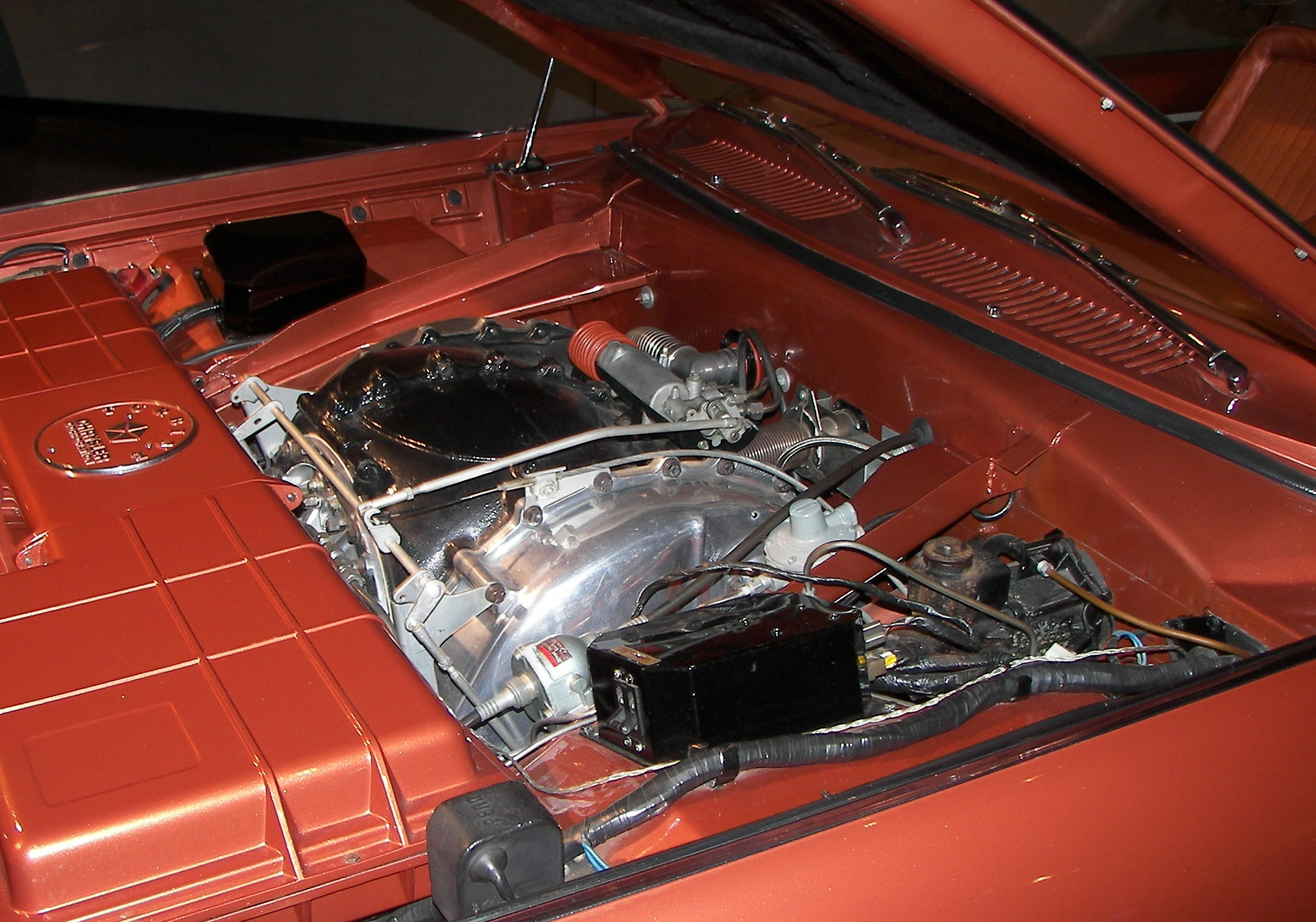
Engine compartment of a Chrysler 1963 Turbine car

Starting in 1954 with a modified Plymouth, the American car manufacturer Chrysler demonstrated several prototype gas-turbine-powered cars from the early 1950s through the early 1980s. Chrysler built fifty Chrysler Turbine Cars in 1963 and conducted the only consumer trial of gas turbine-powered cars. Each of their turbines employed a unique rotating recuperator, referred to as a regenerator that increased efficiency.

In 1954, Fiat unveiled the Fiat Turbina, a concept car with a turbine engine. In addition to the shaft power from the engine, the Turbina used thrust from the turbine exhaust to provide additional forward power. According to Popular Mechanics, the vehicle was able to reach a speed of 282 km/h (175 mph).

In the 1960s, Ford and GM were also developing gas-turbine semi-trucks. Ford displayed the Big Red at the 1964 World's Fair. With the trailer, it was 29 m (96 ft) long, 4.0 m (13 ft) high, and painted crimson red. It contained the Ford-developed gas-turbine engine, with output power and torque of 450 kW (600 hp) and 1,160 N⋅m (855 lb⋅ft). The cab boasted a highway map of the continental U.S., a mini-kitchen, a bathroom, and a TV for the co-driver. The fate of the truck was unknown for several decades, but it was rediscovered in early 2021 in private hands, having been restored to running order. The Chevrolet division of GM built the Turbo Titan series of concept trucks with turbine motors as analogs of the Firebird concepts, including Turbo Titan I (c. 1959, shares GT-304 engine with Firebird II), Turbo Titan II (c. 1962, shares GT-305 engine with Firebird III), and Turbo Titan III (1965, GT-309 engine); in addition, the GM Bison gas-turbine truck was shown at the 1964 World's Fair.

Emissions and fuel economy (1970s/80s)

As a result of the U.S. Clean Air Act Amendments of 1970, research was funded into developing automotive gas-turbine technology. Design concepts and vehicles were conducted by Chrysler, General Motors, Ford (in collaboration with AiResearch), and American Motors (in conjunction with Williams Research). Long-term tests were conducted to evaluate comparable cost efficiency. Several AMC Hornets were powered by a small Williams regenerative gas turbine weighing 250 lb (113 kg) and producing 80 hp (60 kW; 81 PS) at 4450 rpm.

In 1982, General Motors used an Oldsmobile Delta 88 powered by a gas turbine using pulverized coal dust. This was considered for the United States and the western world to reduce dependence on middle east oil at the time

Toyota demonstrated several gas-turbine-powered concept cars, such as the Century gas-turbine hybrid in 1975, the Sports 800 Gas Turbine Hybrid in 1979 and the GTV in 1985. No production vehicles were made. The GT24 engine was exhibited in 1977 without a vehicle.

Later development

In the early 1990s, Volvo introduced the Volvo ECC which was a gas-turbine-powered hybrid electric vehicle.

In 1993, General Motors developed a gas-turbine-powered EV1 series hybrid—as a prototype of the General Motors EV1. A Williams International 40 kW turbine drove an alternator which powered the battery–electric powertrain. The turbine design included a recuperator. In 2006, GM went into the EcoJet concept car project with Jay Leno.

At the 2010 Paris Motor Show Jaguar demonstrated its Jaguar C-X75 concept car. This electrically powered supercar has a top speed of 204 mph (328 km/h) and can go from 0 to 62 mph (0 to 100 km/h) in 3.4 seconds. It uses lithium-ion batteries to power four electric motors, which combine to produce 780 bhp. It will travel 68 miles (109 km) on a single charge of the batteries, and uses a pair of Bladon Micro Gas Turbines to re-charge the batteries extending the range to 560 miles (900 km).

==== Racing cars ====
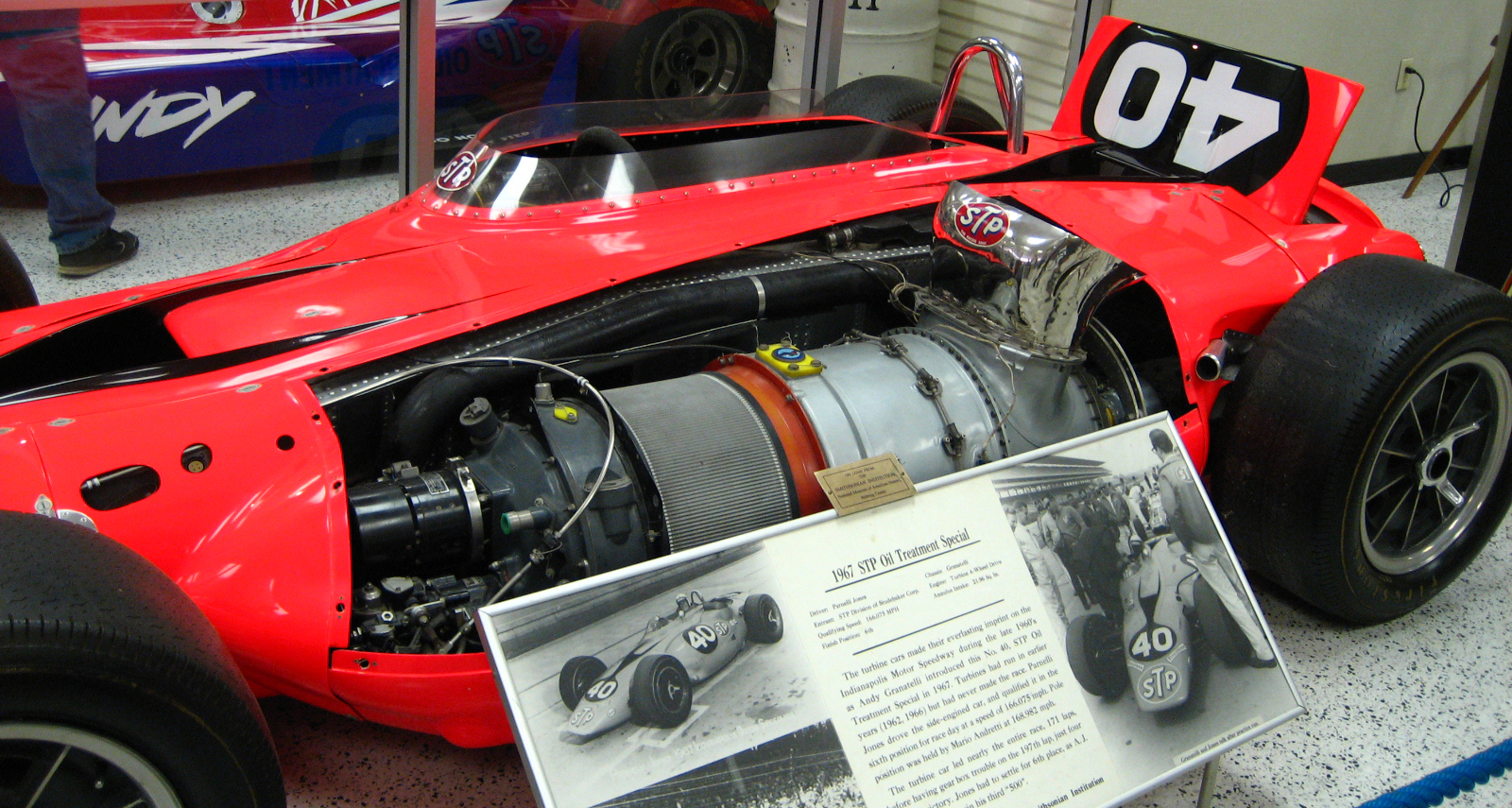
The 1967 STP Oil Treatment Special on display at the Indianapolis Motor Speedway Hall of Fame Museum, with the Pratt & Whitney gas turbine shown

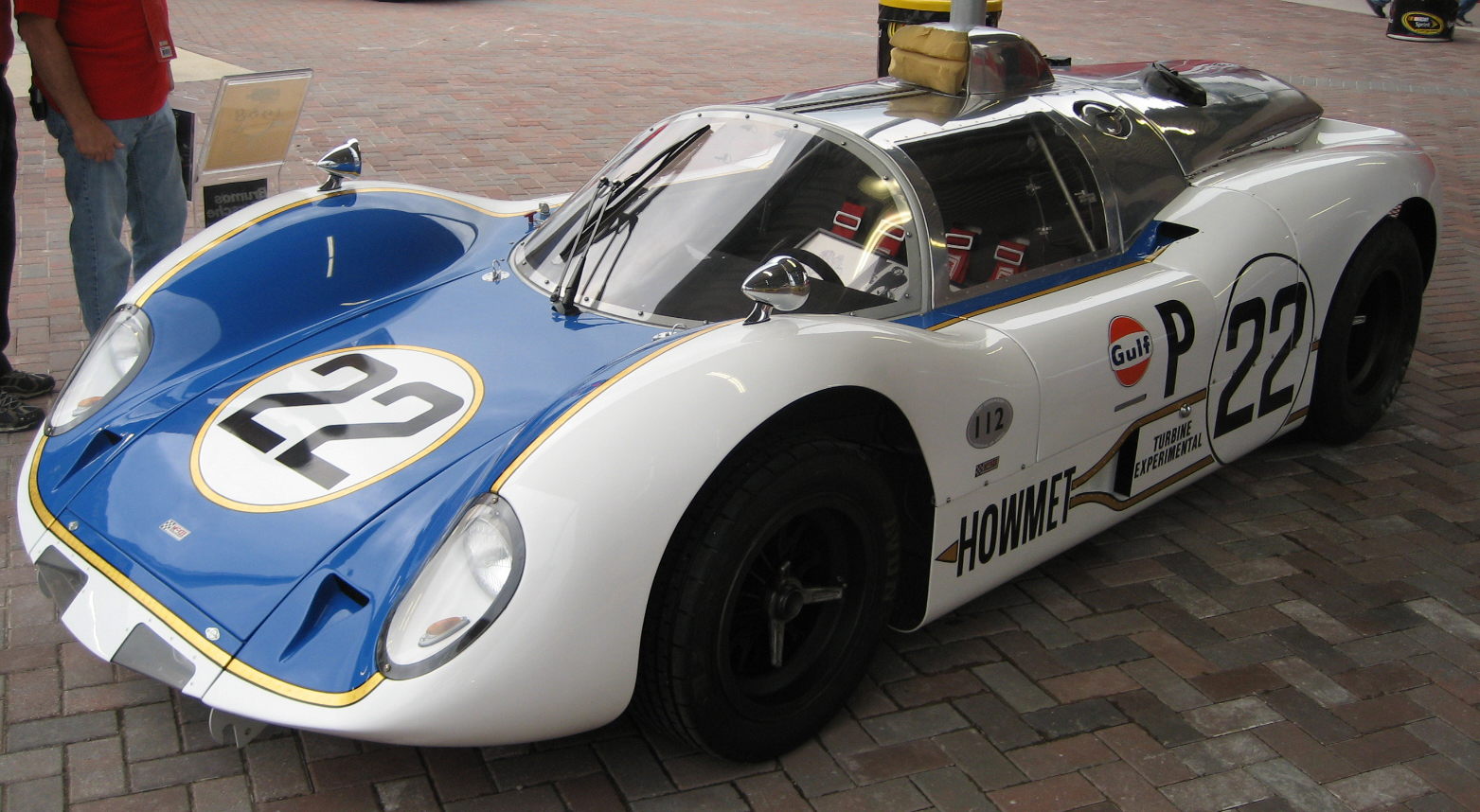
A 1968 Howmet TX, the only turbine-powered race car to have won a race

The first race car (in concept only) fitted with a turbine was in 1955 by a US Air Force group as a hobby project with a turbine loaned them by Boeing and a race car owned by Firestone Tire & Rubber company. The first race car fitted with a turbine for the goal of actual racing was by Rover and the BRM Formula One team joined forces to produce the Rover-BRM, a gas-turbine-powered coupe, which entered the 1963 24 Hours of Le Mans, driven by Graham Hill and Richie Ginther. It averaged 107.8 mph (173.5 km/h) and had a top speed of 142 mph (229 km/h). American Ray Heppenstall joined Howmet Corporation and McKee Engineering together to develop their own gas-turbine sports car in 1968, the Howmet TX, which ran several American and European events, including two wins, and also participated in the 1968 24 Hours of Le Mans. The cars used Continental gas turbines, which eventually set six FIA land speed records for turbine-powered cars.

For open wheel racing, 1967's revolutionary STP-Paxton Turbocar fielded by racing and entrepreneurial legend Andy Granatelli and driven by Parnelli Jones nearly won the Indianapolis 500; the Pratt & Whitney ST6B-62 powered turbine car was almost a lap ahead of the second place car when a gearbox bearing failed just three laps from the finish line. The next year the STP Lotus 56 turbine car won the Indianapolis 500 pole position even though new rules restricted the air intake dramatically. In 1971 Team Lotus principal Colin Chapman introduced the Lotus 56B F1 car, powered by a Pratt & Whitney STN 6/76 gas turbine. Chapman had a reputation of building radical championship-winning cars, but had to abandon the project because there were too many problems with turbo lag.

==== Buses ====
General Motors fitted the GT-30x series of gas turbines (branded "Whirlfire") to several prototype buses in the 1950s and 1960s, including Turbo-Cruiser I (1953, GT-300); Turbo-Cruiser II (1964, GT-309); Turbo-Cruiser III (1968, GT-309); RTX (1968, GT-309); and RTS 3T (1972).

The arrival of the Capstone Turbine has led to several hybrid bus designs, starting with HEV-1 by AVS of Chattanooga, Tennessee in 1999, and closely followed by Ebus and ISE Research in California, and DesignLine Corporation in New Zealand (and later the United States). AVS turbine hybrids were plagued with reliability and quality control problems, resulting in liquidation of AVS in 2003. The most successful design by Designline is now operated in 5 cities in 6 countries, with over 30 buses in operation worldwide, and order for several hundred being delivered to Baltimore, and New York City.

Brescia Italy is using serial hybrid buses powered by microturbines on routes through the historical sections of the city.

==== Motorcycles ====
The MTT Turbine Superbike appeared in 2000 (hence the designation of Y2K Superbike by MTT) and is the first production motorcycle powered by a turbine engine – specifically, a Rolls-Royce Allison model 250 turboshaft engine, producing about 283 kW (380 bhp). Speed-tested to 365 km/h or 227 mph (according to some stories, the testing team ran out of road during the test), it holds the Guinness World Record for most powerful production motorcycle and most expensive production motorcycle, with a price tag of US$185,000.

=== Trains ===
Several locomotive classes have been powered by gas turbines, the most recent incarnation being Bombardier's JetTrain.

=== Tanks ===
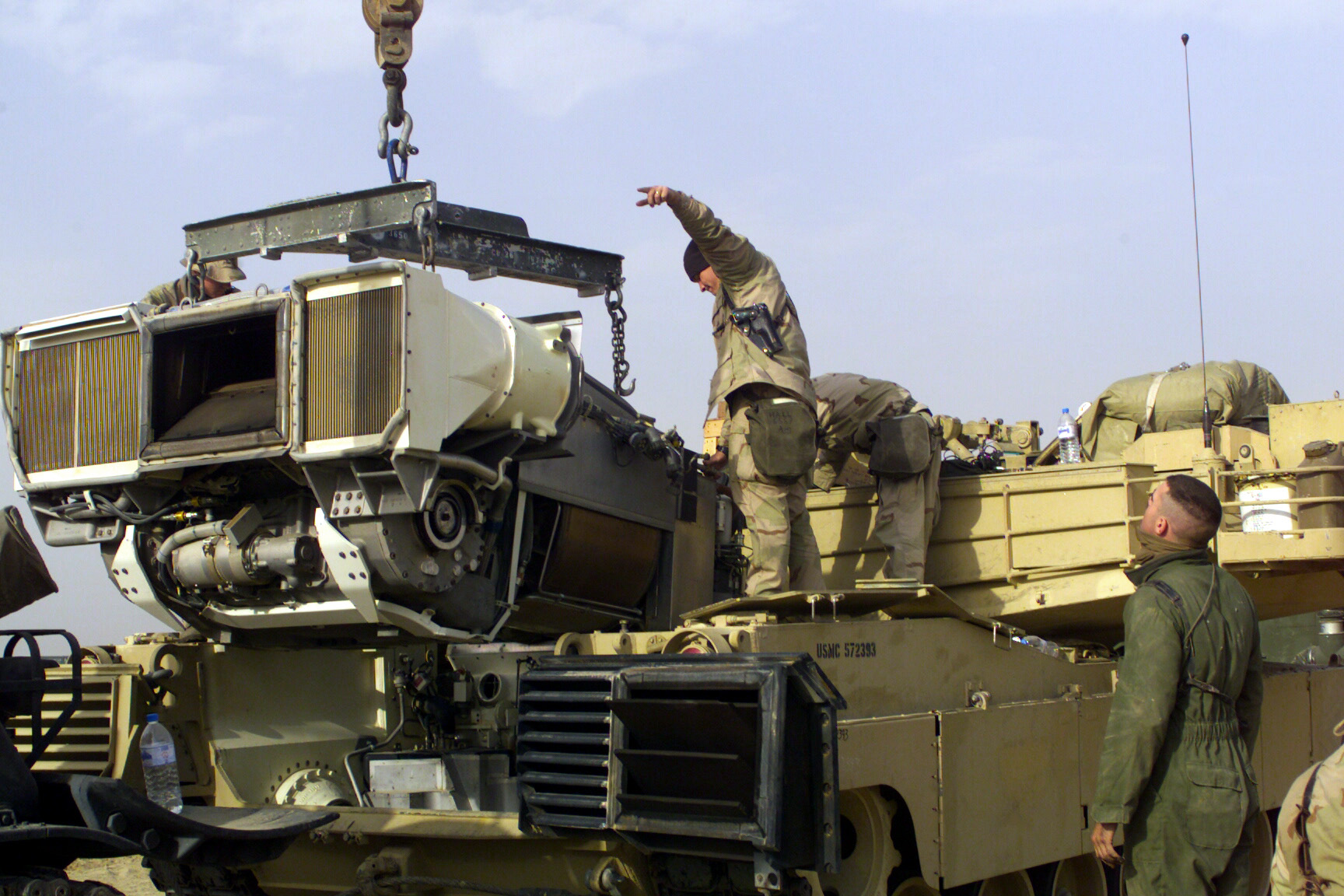
Marines from 1st Tank Battalion load a Honeywell AGT1500 multi-fuel turbine back into an M1 Abrams tank at Camp Coyote, Kuwait, February 2003

The Third Reich Wehrmacht Heer's development division, the Heereswaffenamt (Army Ordnance Board), studied a number of gas-turbine engine designs for use in tanks starting in mid-1944. The first gas-turbine engine design intended for use in armored fighting vehicle propulsion, the BMW 003-based GT 101, was meant for installation in the Panther tank. Towards the end of the war, a Jagdtiger was fitted with one of the aforementioned gas turbines.

The second use of a gas turbine in an armored fighting vehicle was in 1954 when a unit, PU2979, specifically developed for tanks by C. A. Parsons and Company, was installed and trialed in a British Conqueror tank. The Stridsvagn 103 was developed in the 1950s and was the first mass-produced main battle tank to use a turbine engine, the Boeing T50. Since then, gas-turbine engines have been used as auxiliary power units in some tanks and as main powerplants in Soviet/Russian T-80s and U.S. M1 Abrams tanks, among others. They are lighter and smaller than diesel engines at the same sustained power output but the models installed to date are less fuel efficient than the equivalent diesel, especially at idle, requiring more fuel to achieve the same combat range. Successive models of M1 have addressed this problem with battery packs or secondary generators to power the tank's systems while stationary, saving fuel by reducing the need to idle the main turbine. T-80s can mount three large external fuel drums to extend their range. Russia has stopped production of the T-80 in favor of the diesel-powered T-90 (based on the T-72), while Ukraine has developed the diesel-powered T-80UD and T-84 with nearly the power of the gas-turbine tank. The French Leclerc tank's diesel powerplant features the "Hyperbar" hybrid supercharging system, where the engine's turbocharger is completely replaced with a small gas turbine which also works as an assisted diesel exhaust turbocharger, enabling engine rpm-independent boost level control and a higher peak boost pressure to be reached (than with ordinary turbochargers). This system allows a smaller displacement and lighter engine to be used as the tank's power plant and effectively removes turbo lag. This special gas turbine/turbocharger can also work independently from the main engine as an ordinary APU.

A turbine is theoretically more reliable and easier to maintain than a piston engine since it has a simpler construction with fewer moving parts, but in practice, turbine parts experience a higher wear rate due to their higher working speeds. The turbine blades are highly sensitive to dust and fine sand so that in desert operations air filters have to be fitted and changed several times daily. An improperly fitted filter, or a bullet or shell fragment that punctures the filter, can damage the engine. Piston engines (especially if turbocharged) also need well-maintained filters, but they are more resilient if the filter does fail.

Like most modern diesel engines used in tanks, gas turbines are usually multi-fuel engines.

== Marine applications ==
=== Naval ===
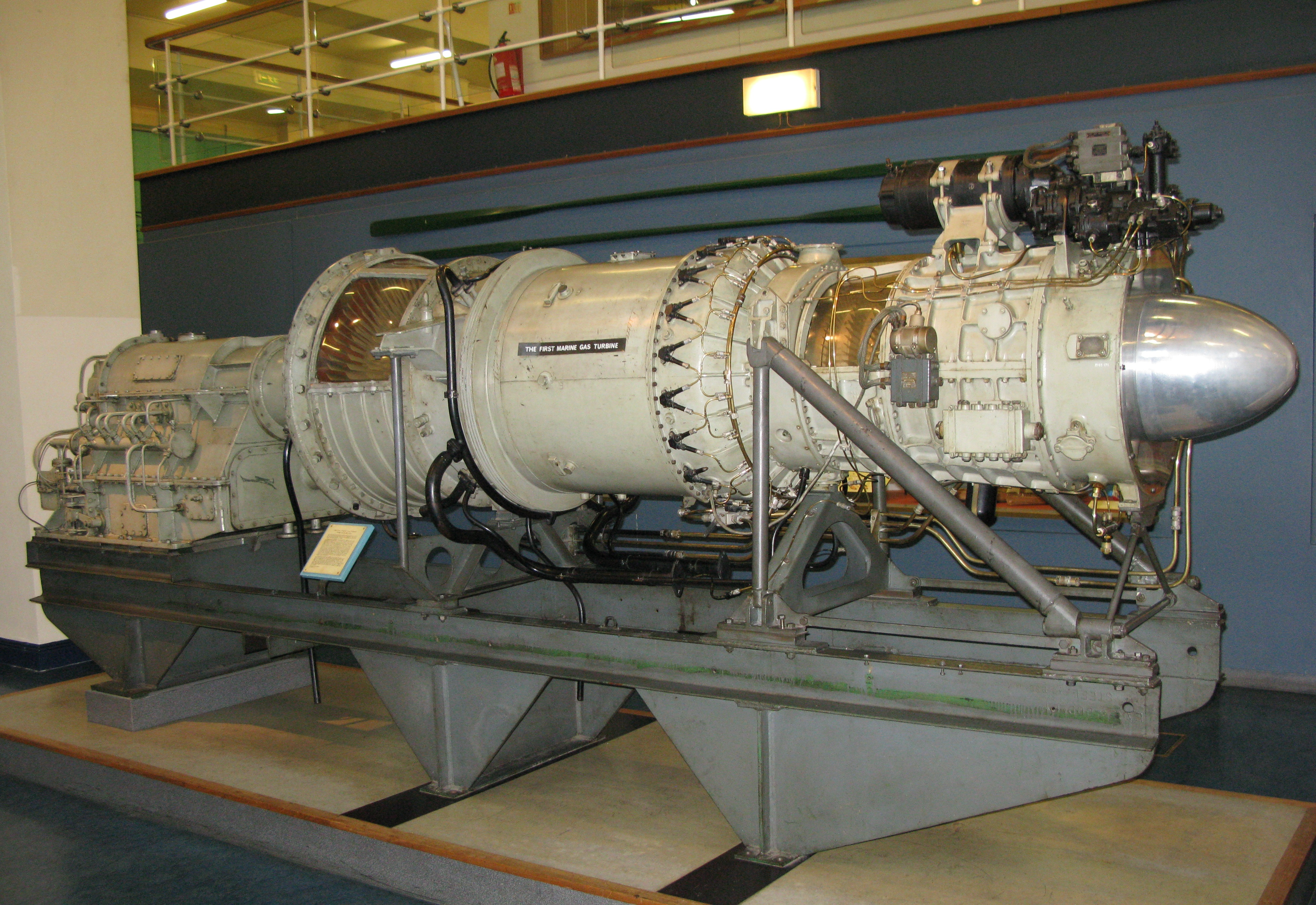
The gas turbine from MGB 2009

Gas turbines are used in many naval vessels, where they are valued for their high power-to-weight ratio and their ships' resulting acceleration and ability to get underway quickly.

The first gas-turbine-powered naval vessel was the Royal Navy's motor gunboat MGB 2009 (formerly MGB 509) converted in 1947. Metropolitan-Vickers fitted their F2/3 jet engine with a power turbine. The Steam Gun Boat Grey Goose was converted to Rolls-Royce gas turbines in 1952 and operated as such from 1953. The Bold class Fast Patrol Boats Bold Pioneer and Bold Pathfinder built in 1953 were the first ships created specifically for gas-turbine propulsion.

The first large-scale, partially gas-turbine powered ships were the Royal Navy's Type 81 (Tribal class) frigates with combined steam and gas powerplants. The first, HMS Ashanti was commissioned in 1961.

The German Navy launched the first Köln-class frigate in 1961 with 2 Brown, Boveri & Cie gas turbines in the world's first combined diesel and gas propulsion system.

The Soviet Navy commissioned in 1962 the first of 25 Kashin-class destroyer with 4 gas turbines in combined gas and gas propulsion system. Those vessels used 4 M8E gas turbines, which generated 54,000–72,000 kW (72,000–96,000 hp). Those ships were the first large ships in the world to be powered solely by gas turbines.

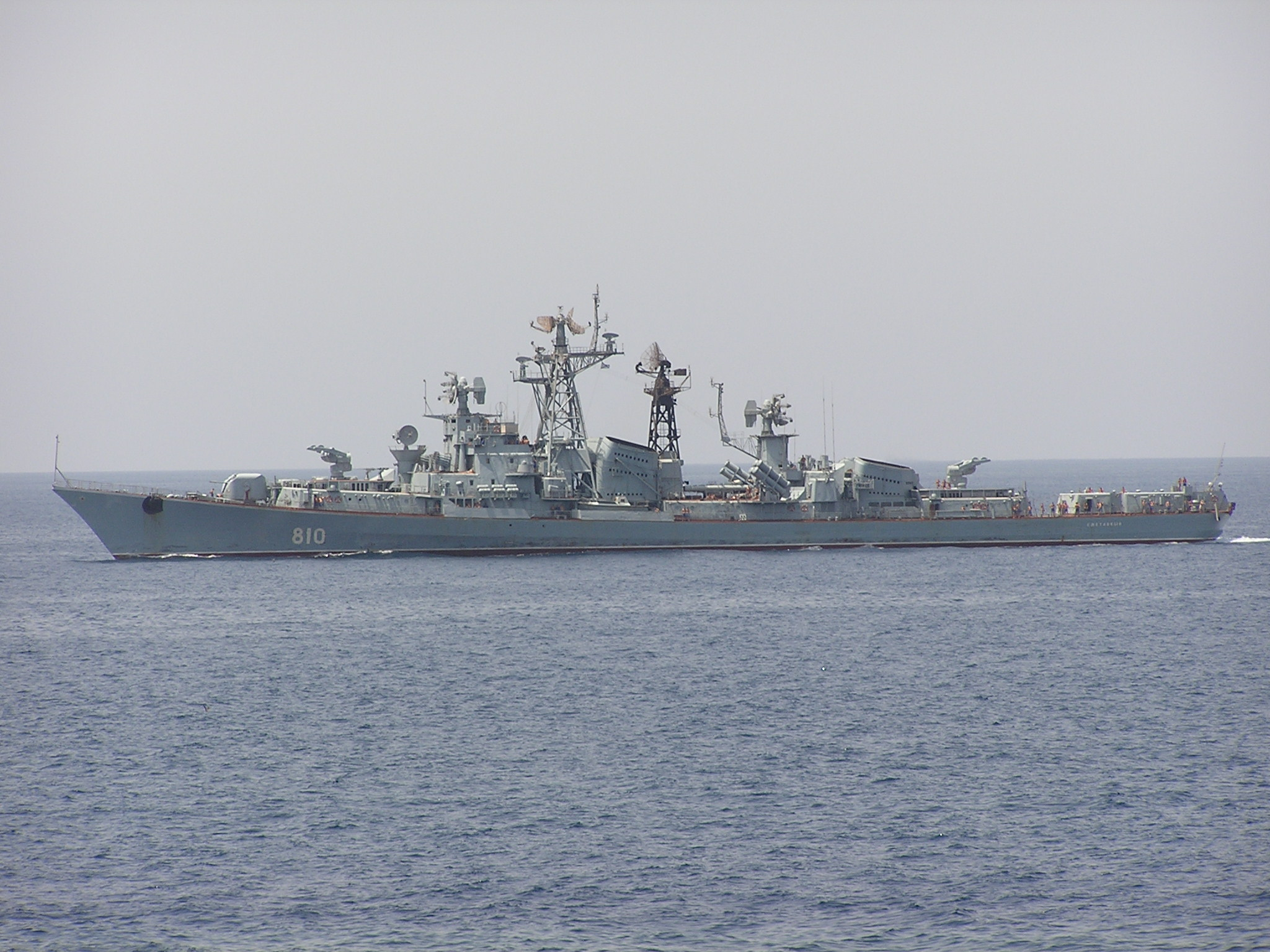
Project 61 large ASW ship, Kashin-class destroyer

The Danish Navy had 6 Søløven-class torpedo boats (the export version of the British Brave class fast patrol boat) in service from 1965 to 1990, which had 3 Bristol Proteus (later RR Proteus) Marine Gas Turbines rated at 9,510 kW (12,750 shp) combined, plus two General Motors Diesel engines, rated at 340 kW (460 shp), for better fuel economy at slower speeds. And they also produced 10 Willemoes Class Torpedo / Guided Missile boats (in service from 1974 to 2000) which had 3 Rolls-Royce Marine Proteus Gas Turbines also rated at 9,510 kW (12,750 shp), same as the Søløven-class boats, and 2 General Motors Diesel Engines, rated at 600 kW (800 shp), also for improved fuel economy at slow speeds.

The Swedish Navy produced 6 Spica-class torpedo boats between 1966 and 1967 powered by 3 Bristol Siddeley Proteus 1282 turbines, each delivering 3,210 kW (4,300 shp). They were later joined by 12 upgraded Norrköping class ships, still with the same engines. With their aft torpedo tubes replaced by antishipping missiles they served as missile boats until the last was retired in 2005.

The Finnish Navy commissioned two Turunmaa-class corvettes, Turunmaa and Karjala, in 1968. They were equipped with one 16,410 kW (22,000 shp) Rolls-Royce Olympus TM1 gas turbine and three Wärtsilä marine diesels for slower speeds. They were the fastest vessels in the Finnish Navy; they regularly achieved speeds of 35 knots, and 37.3 knots during sea trials. The Turunmaas were decommissioned in 2002. Karjala is today a museum ship in Turku, and Turunmaa serves as a floating machine shop and training ship for Satakunta Polytechnical College.

The next series of major naval vessels were the four Canadian Iroquois-class helicopter carrying destroyers first commissioned in 1972. They used 2 ft-4 main propulsion engines, 2 ft-12 cruise engines and 3 Solar Saturn 750 kW generators.

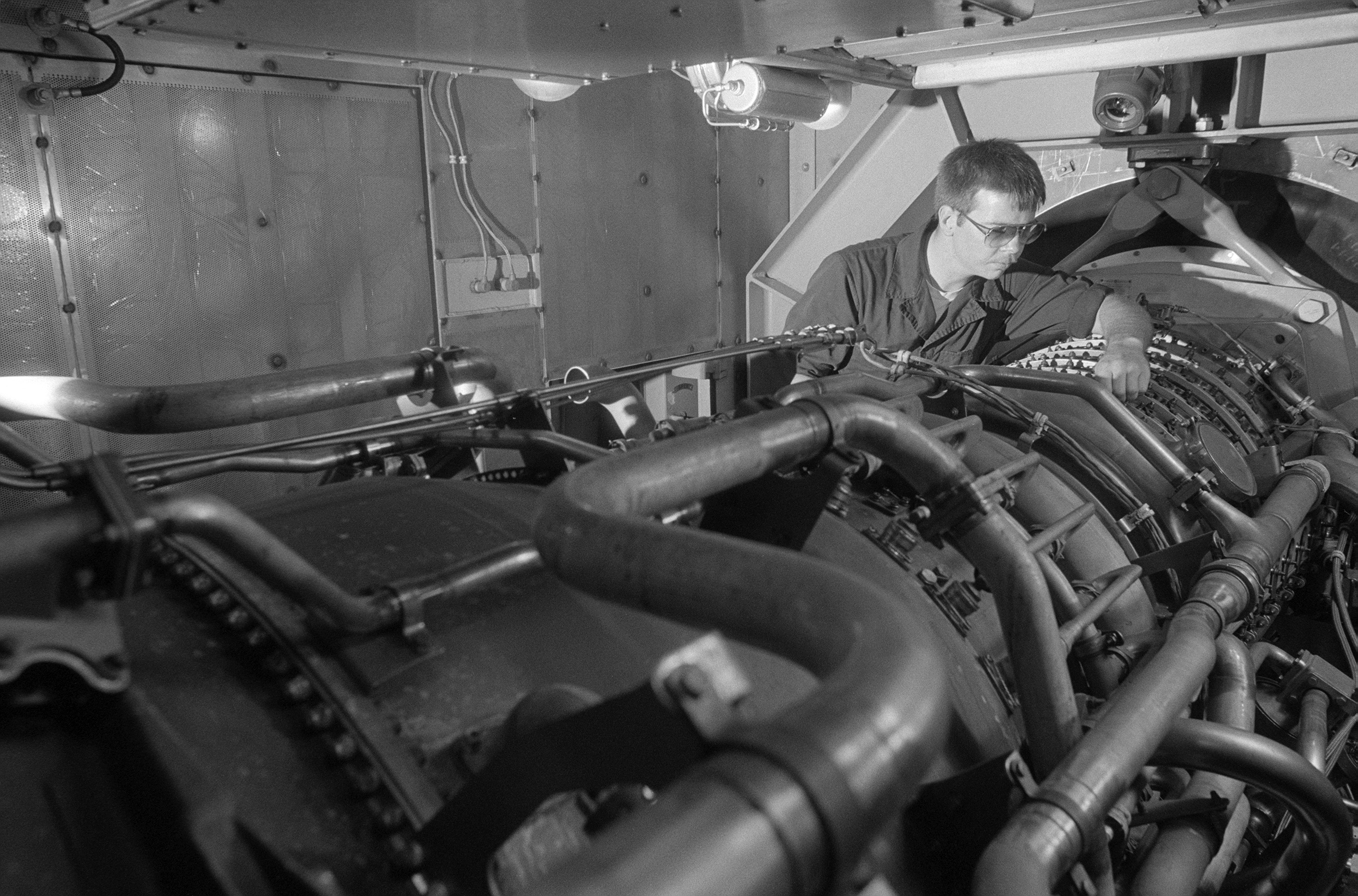
An LM2500 gas turbine on USS Ford

The first U.S. gas-turbine powered ship was the U.S. Coast Guard's Point Thatcher, a cutter commissioned in 1961 that was powered by two 750 kW (1,000 shp) turbines utilizing controllable-pitch propellers. The larger Hamilton-class High Endurance Cutters, was the first class of larger cutters to utilize gas turbines, the first of which (USCGC Hamilton) was commissioned in 1967. Since then, they have powered the U.S. Navy's Oliver Hazard Perry-class frigates, Spruance and Arleigh Burke-class destroyers, and Ticonderoga-class guided missile cruisers. USS Makin Island, a modified Wasp-class amphibious assault ship, is to be the Navy's first amphibious assault ship powered by gas turbines. The marine gas turbine operates in a more corrosive atmosphere due to the presence of sea salt in air and fuel and use of cheaper fuels.

=== Civilian maritime ===
Up to the late 1940s, much of the progress on marine gas turbines all over the world took place in design offices and engine builder's workshops and development work was led by the British Royal Navy and other Navies. While interest in the gas turbine for marine purposes, both naval and mercantile, continued to increase, the lack of availability of the results of operating experience on early gas-turbine projects limited the number of new ventures on seagoing commercial vessels being embarked upon.

In 1951, the diesel–electric oil tanker Auris, 12,290 deadweight tonnage (DWT) was used to obtain operating experience with a main propulsion gas turbine under service conditions at sea and so became the first ocean-going merchant ship to be powered by a gas turbine. Built by Hawthorn Leslie at Hebburn-on-Tyne, UK, in accordance with plans and specifications drawn up by the Anglo-Saxon Petroleum Company and launched on the UK's Princess Elizabeth's 21st birthday in 1947, the ship was designed with an engine room layout that would allow for the experimental use of heavy fuel in one of its high-speed engines, as well as the future substitution of one of its diesel engines by a gas turbine. The Auris operated commercially as a tanker for three-and-a-half years with a diesel–electric propulsion unit as originally commissioned, but in 1951 one of its four 824 kW (1,105 bhp) diesel engines – which were known as "Faith", "Hope", "Charity" and "Prudence" – was replaced by the world's first marine gas-turbine engine, a 890 kW (1,200 bhp) open-cycle gas turbo-alternator built by British Thompson-Houston Company in Rugby. Following successful sea trials off the Northumbrian coast, the Auris set sail from Hebburn-on-Tyne in October 1951 bound for Port Arthur in the US and then Curaçao in the southern Caribbean returning to Avonmouth after 44 days at sea, successfully completing her historic trans-Atlantic crossing. During this time at sea the gas turbine burnt diesel fuel and operated without an involuntary stop or mechanical difficulty of any kind. She subsequently visited Swansea, Hull, Rotterdam, Oslo and Southampton covering a total of 13,211 nautical miles. The Auris then had all of its power plants replaced with a 3,910 kW (5,250 shp) directly coupled gas turbine to become the first civilian ship to operate solely on gas-turbine power.

Despite the success of this early experimental voyage the gas turbine did not replace the diesel engine as the propulsion plant for large merchant ships. At constant cruising speeds the diesel engine simply had no peer in the vital area of fuel economy. The gas turbine did have more success in Royal Navy ships and the other naval fleets of the world where sudden and rapid changes of speed are required by warships in action.

The United States Maritime Commission were looking for options to update WWII Liberty ships, and heavy-duty gas turbines were one of those selected. In 1956 the John Sergeant was lengthened and equipped with a General Electric 4,900 kW (6,600 shp) HD gas turbine with exhaust-gas regeneration, reduction gearing and a variable-pitch propeller. It operated for 9,700 hours using residual fuel (Bunker C) for 7,000 hours. Fuel efficiency was on a par with steam propulsion at 0.318 kg/kW (0.523 lb/hp) per hour, and power output was higher than expected at 5,603 kW (7,514 shp) due to the ambient temperature of the North Sea route being lower than the design temperature of the gas turbine. This gave the ship a speed capability of 18 knots, up from 11 knots with the original power plant, and well in excess of the 15 knot targeted. The ship made its first transatlantic crossing with an average speed of 16.8 knots, in spite of some rough weather along the way. Suitable Bunker C fuel was only available at limited ports because the quality of the fuel was of a critical nature. The fuel oil also had to be treated on board to reduce contaminants and this was a labor-intensive process that was not suitable for automation at the time. Ultimately, the variable-pitch propeller, which was of a new and untested design, ended the trial, as three consecutive annual inspections revealed stress-cracking. This did not reflect poorly on the marine-propulsion gas-turbine concept though, and the trial was a success overall. The success of this trial opened the way for more development by GE on the use of HD gas turbines for marine use with heavy fuels. The John Sergeant was scrapped in 1972 at Portsmouth PA.

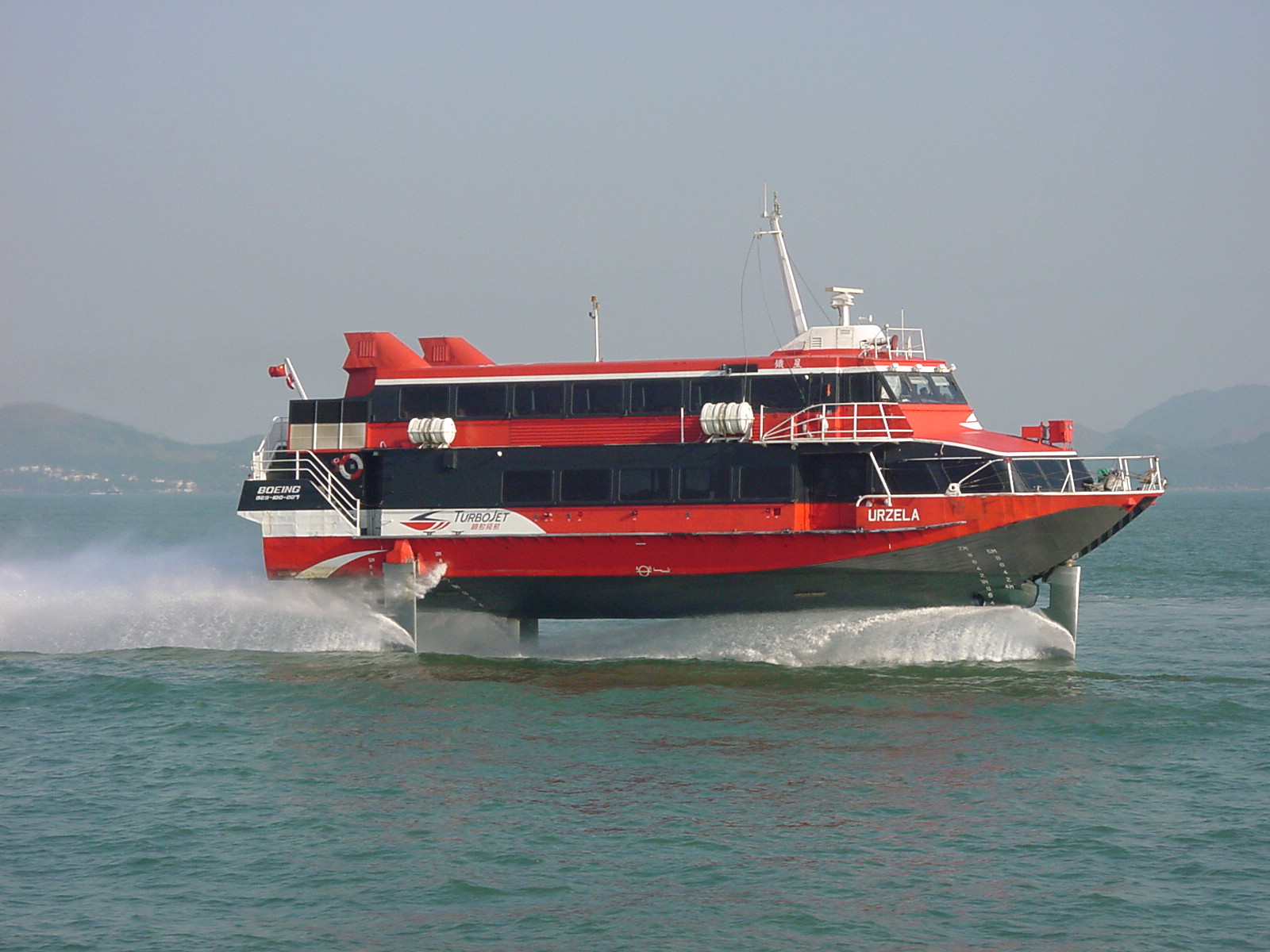
Boeing Jetfoil 929-100-007 Urzela of TurboJET

Boeing launched its first passenger-carrying waterjet-propelled hydrofoil Boeing 929, in April 1974. Those ships were powered by two Allison 501-KF gas turbines.

Between 1971 and 1981, Seatrain Lines operated a scheduled container service between ports on the eastern seaboard of the United States and ports in northwest Europe across the North Atlantic with four container ships of 26,000 tonnes DWT. Those ships were powered by twin Pratt & Whitney gas turbines of the FT 4 series. The four ships in the class were named Euroliner, Eurofreighter, Asialiner and Asiafreighter. Following the dramatic Organization of the Petroleum Exporting Countries (OPEC) price increases of the mid-1970s, operations were constrained by rising fuel costs. Some modification of the engine systems on those ships was undertaken to permit the burning of a lower grade of fuel (i.e., marine diesel). Reduction of fuel costs was successful using a different untested fuel in a marine gas turbine but maintenance costs increased with the fuel change. After 1981 the ships were sold and refitted with, what at the time, was more economical diesel-fueled engines but the increased engine size reduced cargo space.

The first passenger ferry to use a gas turbine was the GTS Finnjet, built in 1977 and powered by two Pratt & Whitney FT 4C-1 DLF turbines, generating 55,000 kW (74,000 shp) and propelling the ship to a speed of 31 knots. However, the Finnjet also illustrated the shortcomings of gas-turbine propulsion in commercial craft, as high fuel prices made operating her unprofitable. After four years of service, additional diesel engines were installed on the ship to reduce running costs during the off-season. The Finnjet was also the first ship with a combined diesel–electric and gas propulsion. Another example of commercial use of gas turbines in a passenger ship is Stena Line's HSS class fastcraft ferries. HSS 1500-class Stena Explorer, Stena Voyager and Stena Discovery vessels use combined gas and gas setups of twin GE LM2500 plus GE LM1600 power for a total of 68,000 kW (91,000 shp). The slightly smaller HSS 900-class Stena Carisma, uses twin ABB–STAL GT35 turbines rated at 34,000 kW (46,000 shp) gross. The Stena Discovery was withdrawn from service in 2007, another victim of too high fuel costs.

In July 2000, the Millennium became the first cruise ship to be powered by both gas and steam turbines. The ship featured two General Electric LM2500 gas-turbine generators whose exhaust heat was used to operate a steam turbine generator in a COGES (combined gas electric and steam) configuration. Propulsion was provided by two electrically driven Rolls-Royce Mermaid azimuth pods. The liner RMS Queen Mary 2 uses a combined diesel and gas configuration.

In marine racing applications the 2010 C5000 Mystic catamaran Miss GEICO uses two Lycoming T-55 turbines for its power system.

== Technology advances ==
Gas-turbine technology has steadily advanced since its inception and continues to evolve. Development is actively producing both smaller gas turbines and more powerful and efficient engines. Aiding in these advances are computer-based design (specifically computational fluid dynamics and finite element analysis) and the development of advanced materials: Base materials with superior high-temperature strength (e.g., single-crystal superalloys that exhibit yield strength anomaly) or thermal barrier coatings that protect the structural material from ever-higher temperatures. These advances allow higher compression ratios and turbine inlet temperatures, more efficient combustion and better cooling of engine parts.

Computational fluid dynamics (CFD) has contributed to substantial improvements in the performance and efficiency of gas-turbine engine components through enhanced understanding of the complex viscous flow and heat transfer phenomena involved. For this reason, CFD is one of the key computational tools used in design and development of gas turbine engines.

The simple-cycle efficiencies of early gas turbines were practically doubled by incorporating inter-cooling, regeneration (or recuperation), and reheating. These improvements, of course, come at the expense of increased initial and operation costs, and they cannot be justified unless the decrease in fuel costs offsets the increase in other costs. The relatively low fuel prices, the general desire in the industry to minimize installation costs, and the tremendous increase in the simple-cycle efficiency to about 40 percent left little desire for opting for these modifications.

On the emissions side, the challenge is to increase turbine inlet temperatures while at the same time reducing peak flame temperature in order to achieve lower NOx emissions and meet the latest emission regulations. In May 2011, Mitsubishi Heavy Industries achieved a turbine inlet temperature of 1,600 °C (2,900 °F) on a 320 megawatt gas turbine, and 460 MW in gas-turbine combined-cycle power generation applications in which gross thermal efficiency exceeds 60%.

Compliant foil bearings were commercially introduced to gas turbines in the 1990s. These can withstand over a hundred thousand start/stop cycles and have eliminated the need for an oil system. The application of microelectronics and power switching technology have enabled the development of commercially viable electricity generation by microturbines for distribution and vehicle propulsion.

In 2013, General Electric started the development of the GE9X with a compression ratio of 61:1.

== Advantages and disadvantages ==
The following are advantages and disadvantages of gas-turbine engines:

Advantages include:

- Very high power-to-weight ratio compared to reciprocating engines.
- Smaller than most reciprocating engines of the same power rating.
- Smooth, continuous rotation of the main shaft produces far less vibration than a reciprocating engine.
- Fewer moving parts than reciprocating engines results in lower maintenance cost and higher reliability/availability over its service life.
- Greater reliability, particularly in applications where sustained high power output is required.
- Waste heat is dissipated almost entirely in the exhaust. This results in a high-temperature exhaust stream that is very usable for boiling water in a combined cycle, or for cogeneration.
- Lower peak combustion pressures than reciprocating engines in general.
- High shaft speeds in smaller "free turbine units", although larger gas turbines employed in power generation operate at synchronous speeds.
- Low lubricating oil cost and consumption.
- Can run on a wide variety of fuels.
- Very low toxic emissions of CO and HC due to excess air, complete combustion and no "quench" of the flame on cold surfaces.

Disadvantages include:

- Core engine costs can be high due to the use of exotic materials, especially in applications where high reliability is required (e.g. aircraft propulsion)
- Less efficient than reciprocating engines at idle speed.
- Longer startup than reciprocating engines.
- Less responsive to changes in power demand compared with reciprocating engines.
- Characteristic whine can be hard to suppress. The exhaust (particularly on turbojets) can also produce a distinctive roaring sound.

== Major manufacturers ==
- Aero Engine Corporation of China (AECC)
- Alstom
- Ansaldo Energia
- Bharat Heavy Electricals Limited (BHEL)
- Doosan Enerbility
- GE Aerospace
- GE Vernova
- Hanwha Aerospace
- Harbin Electric
- Hindustan Aeronautics Limited
- Howmet Aerospace
- IHI Corporation
- Kawasaki Heavy Industries
- MAN Turbo
- MAPNA Group
- Mitsubishi Heavy Industries
- MTU Aero Engines
- Rolls-Royce Holdings
- Power Machines (Silmash)
- Pratt & Whitney
- Pratt & Whitney Canada
- Shanghai Electric
- Siemens Energy
- Solar Turbines
- United Engine Corporation (ODK)
- Zorya-Mashproekt

== Testing ==
British, German, other national and international test codes are used to standardize the procedures and definitions used to test gas turbines. Selection of the test code to be used is an agreement between the purchaser and the manufacturer, and has some significance to the design of the turbine and associated systems. In the United States, ASME has produced several performance test codes on gas turbines. This includes ASME PTC 22–2014. These ASME performance test codes have gained international recognition and acceptance for testing gas turbines. The single most important and differentiating characteristic of ASME performance test codes, including PTC 22, is that the test uncertainty of the measurement indicates the quality of the test and is not to be used as a commercial tolerance.

== See also ==
- List of aircraft engines
- Centrifugal compressor
- Gas turbine modular helium reactor
- Rotating detonation engine
- Pneumatic motor
- Pulsejet
- Steam turbine
- Turbine engine failure
- Wind turbine
