= Bjørn Rune Gjelsten =

Norwegian powerboat racer

Bjørn Rune Gjelsten (born 17 September 1956 in Tomrefjord) is a Norwegian businessman and Offshore powerboat racing World Champion. He was also a joint owner of Wimbledon Football Club and involved in the controversial relocation of the team from London to Milton Keynes.

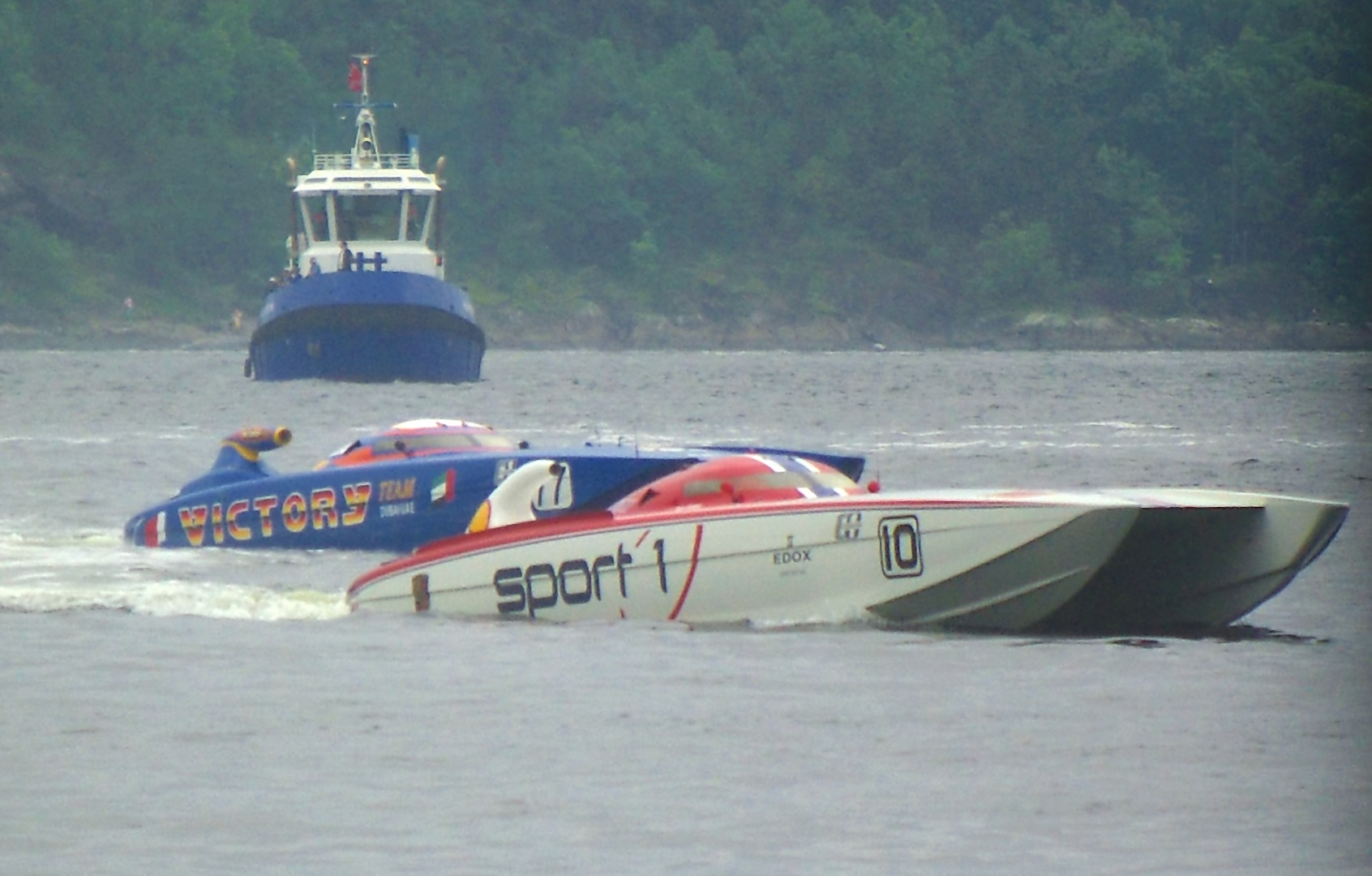
Spirit of Norway 10 with Steve Curtis at Oslo in 2007

== Offshore powerboat racing career ==
Gjelsten made his powerboat racing debut in 1994 in the U.S., winning his first race in Jacksonville with throttleman Jim Dyke. In 1996, he formed Class 1's most successful partnership with Englishman Steve Curtis, which in the "Spirit of Norway" the pair took:

- The World Championship - 1997, 1998, 2002, 2003, 2004
- The European Championship - 1998, 2002, 2003
- The Middle East Championship - 2003, 2004
- The Pole Position Championship - 2001, 2002, 2003, 2004

Curtis was awarded the Segrave Trophy in 2003, and the committee presented Gjelsten with a Segrave Certificate. In 2004, Gjelsten retired to concentrate on his businesses, and sold the "Spirit of Norway" team to Bård Eker, who won the 2005 Championship with Curtis. In 2006, Gjelsten bought back the team from Eker, and won the 2006 Championship with Curtis.

== Relocation of Wimbledon Football Club ==
Buying into Wimbledon Football Club in the late 1990s, Gjelsten and his business partner Kjell Inge Røkke became joint owners of the team in 2000. The following year, with the side homeless since leaving their Plough Lane ground in 1991 and playing at Crystal Palace's Selhurst Park stadium in Croydon, southeast London, Gjelsten, along with Røkke, chairman Charles Koppel and businessman Pete Winkelman agreed to relocate the team to Milton Keynes, a town around 60 miles from their traditional base. This sparked a year of protest at matches from Wimbledon fans, determined not to let their club be 'franchised' like this. Although common in American sport, the relocation of a professional English football club had never been done before.

After rejections from the Football League and the Football Association, the decision was eventually passed on to a three-man arbitration panel, the outcome being two to one in favour of the move. Wimbledon fans, outraged with the decision, agreed to form a new club to support, AFC Wimbledon, and declared a boycott on their former team. The following season, Wimbledon FC would go on to play in front of record low crowds, including just 664 for a League Cup game against Rotherham, before finally completing the move in 2004, becoming Milton Keynes Dons.
