= Steve Curtis =

British powerboat racer

Steve Curtis MBE
Personal information
- Nationality: British
- Born: 9 June 1964 (age 62) Wimbledon, London, England

Sport
- Sport: Offshore powerboat racing
- Former partner: Bjørn Rune Gjelsten

Achievements and titles
- World finals: Eight

Steve Curtis MBE (born 9 June 1964, in Wimbledon) is a British nine time offshore powerboat racing World Champion.

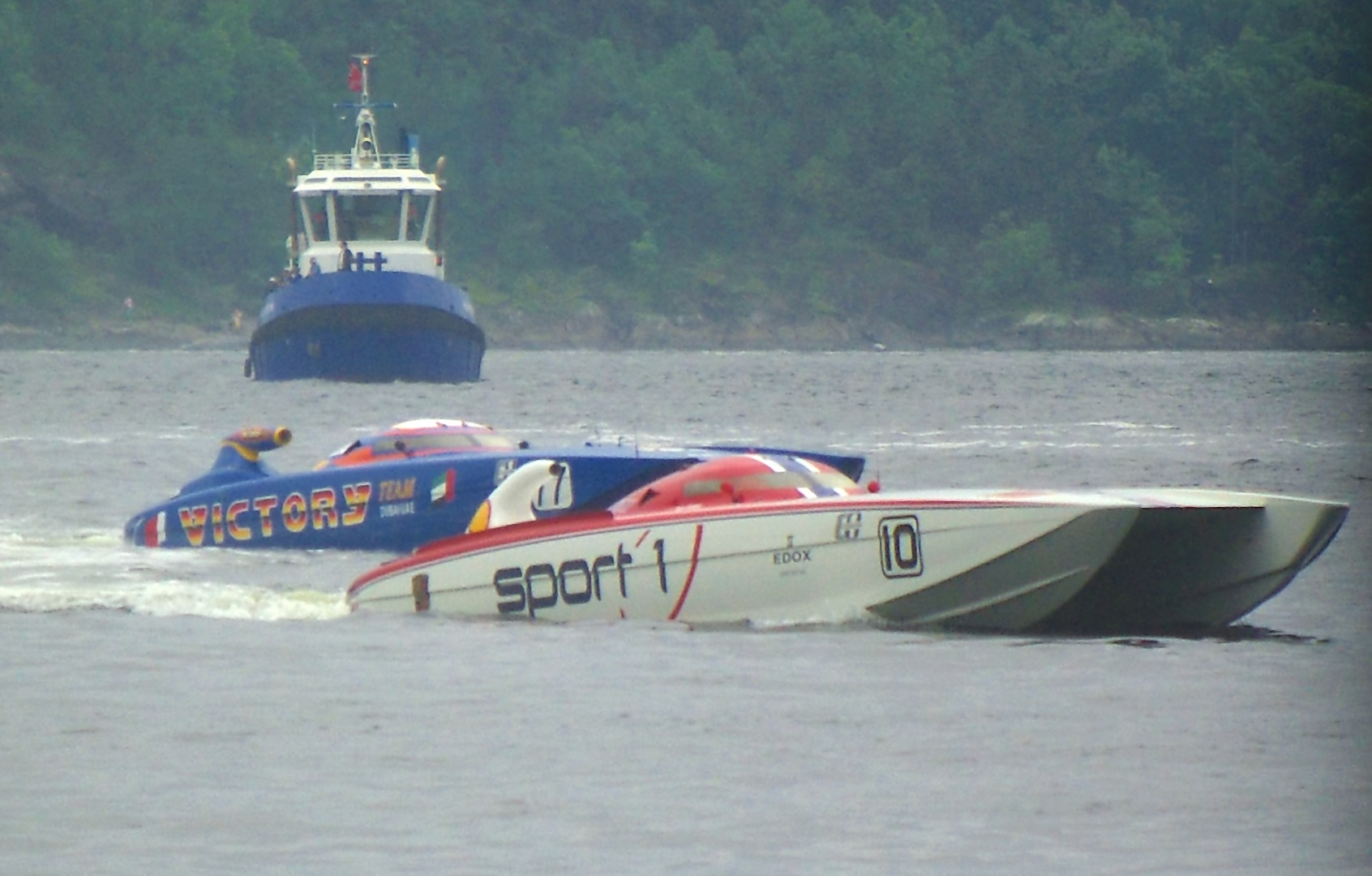
On Spirit of Norway 10 with Bjørn Gjelsten at Oslo in 2007

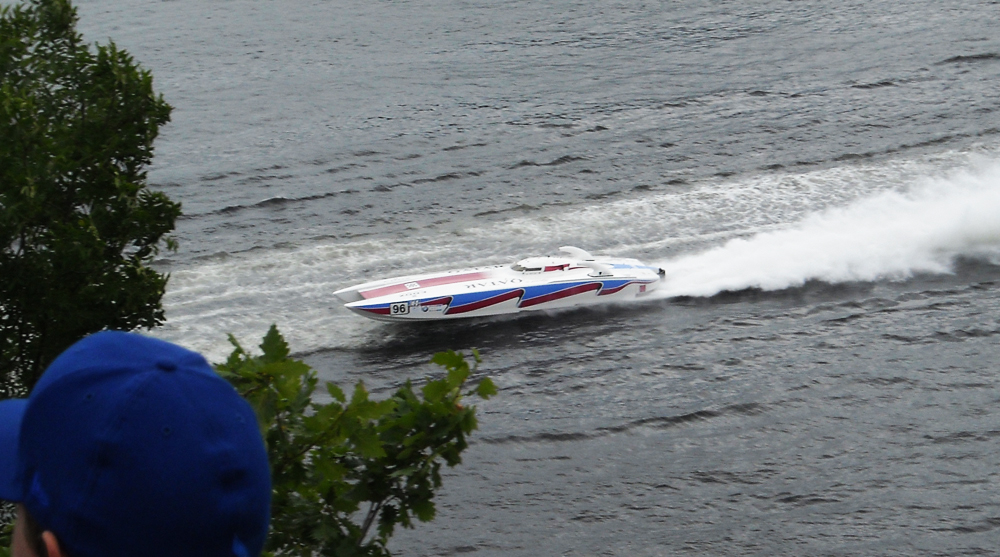
On Qatar 96 with Sheikh Hassan Bin Jabor Al-Thani at Arendal, Norway, in 2009

Curtis's father Clive ran boat-building business Cougar Marine, and also was a powerboat racer, making entry to the watercraft racing world easier for his son, after leaving school aged 17. Before switching to boats in 1983, Curtis had a career as a motocross rider, winning the British schoolboy and junior motocross championships.

Curtis won his first title in the United States at age 21 in 1985, becoming the youngest ever Class 1 champion and the first Briton to win the title. He won his second title in 1987, and in 1998 he won his third title as throttleman on Spirit of Norway, with driving partner Bjørn Rune Gjelsten. The pairing became the most successful team in Class 1 so far: Since that date, his other achievements include:

- The World Championship - 1997, 1998, 2002, 2003, 2004
- The European Championship - 1998, 2002, 2003
- The Middle East Championship - 2003, 2004
- The Pole Position Championship - 2001, 2002, 2003, 2004

In 2005 Gjelsten retired, and Bard Eker took over as owner/pilot of Spirit of Norway, and he and Curtis took the championship again. Curtis again paired with Gjelsten in 2006, when they garnered all four world titles (World Championship, Pole Position Championship, Middle East and European titles).

Curtis runs his family business, Cougar Marine, based in Hampshire. He won the Segrave Trophy in 2003 and was awarded an MBE in the Queen's 80th Birthday Honours list.

Curtis won the SBIP-APBA Offshore World Championship in 1987, becoming the first Briton to do so and again in 2008 with Tom Abrams.

During the 2019 APBA National Championship, Curtis raced Miss GEICO in Class One International with Miles Jennings.

In 2019, Curtis became an ambassador for the Offshore Model Racing Association in the United Kingdom.
