= Kjell Veine =

Norwegian architect (born 1934)

- Born: 17 March 1934 (age 91); Fredrikstad, Norway
- Children: 3

Kjell Sverre Veine (born 17 March 1934 in Fredrikstad) is a Norwegian architect who has drawn and participated in several construction projects for construction and housing in Fredrikstad, Sarpsborg and several places in Østfold. For many years he had his architectural office in the Old Town of Fredrikstad.

He also helped with making Scandinavia's biggest model railway centre.

He is a close friend of Bård Eker.
