= Miles Jennings =

British businessman and boat racer, born 1961

Miles Jennings (born 14 July 1961) is a British businessman and five time offshore powerboat racing World Champion. Jennings formed Stovax Ltd in 1981 and a sister company, Original Style in 1986.

== Racing career ==
He has competed in both Inshore powerboat racing and Offshore powerboat racing for 41 consecutive years.

In 2019 Jennings raced in Britain with Drew Langdon, winning the UKOPRA Offshore 1 World Championship 2019, in Singapore winning the Asia Powerboat Championship and in America with Steve Curtis in Miss GEICO.

His recent racing highlights include:

- Harmsworth Cup Winner 2018
- UKOPRA Offshore 1 World Champion 2018
- UKOPRA Offshore 1 World Champion 2019
- Asia Powerboat Championship – Singapore 2019

== See also ==
- P1 SuperStock
