= Miss GEICO =

Offshore powerboat racing team

The Miss GEICO offshore powerboat racing team was founded by John Haggin, who retired from the team in 2010. Today Miss GEICO is owned and operated by AMF Riviera Beach which is owned by Marc Granet, Scotty Begovich, Scott Colton, Gary Stray, Gary Goodell and sponsored by the American insurance company GEICO. There have been several versions of the Miss GEICO boat, including one of the fastest offshore powerboats in the world. The most powerful was a 50' Mystic powered by twin Lycoming T-53 turbine engines, reaching speeds exceeding 210 mph (340 km/h); which caught fire during testing on June 30, 2012, in Sarasota, Florida, and burned to the waterline, with no injuries.

When driven by Granet and throttled by Begovich, Miss GEICO won five consecutive World Championships, in 2006, 2007, 2008, 2009 and 2010.

In 2020, Travis Pastrana and British offshore racer Steve Curtis crewed the boat.

Miss GEICO officially retired from offshore powerboat racing in August 2021 due to the withdrawal of its main sponsor, GEICO.

== Accomplishments ==
- 2010 OPA World Champion, Extreme Class
- 2009 SBI World Champion, Turbine Class
- 2009 OPA National Champion
- 2009 World Speed Record – Miami to Palm Beach in 45:49
- 2009 SBI World Kilo Record Run, Turbine Class – 188.5 mph
- 2008 SBI World Champion, Turbine Class
- 2008 OSS National Champion, Turbine Extreme Class
- 2008 OPA National Points Champion, Extreme Class
- 2008 OPA Miss GEICO Triple Crown Champion, Extreme Class
- 2008 SBI Florida State Champion, Turbine Class
- 2008 World Speed Biofuel Record between Annapolis and Baltimore
- 2007 SBI World Champion, Turbine Class
- 2007 OPA World Champion, Extreme Class
- 2007 OSS World Champion, Turbine Extreme Class
- 2007 OSS National Champion, Turbine Extreme Class
- 2007 World Speed Record between Annapolis and Baltimore - 14 minutes and seven seconds
- 2007 'Chattanooga Mile' Speed Record – 188.285 mph
- 2006 OSS World Champion, Turbine Extreme Class
- 2006 OPA/POPRA World Champion, Extreme Class
- 2006 OSS National Champion, Turbine Extreme Class
- 2006 Class Champion – LOTO Shootout
- 2006 King of the Delta Pacific Offshore POPRA

== Specifications ==
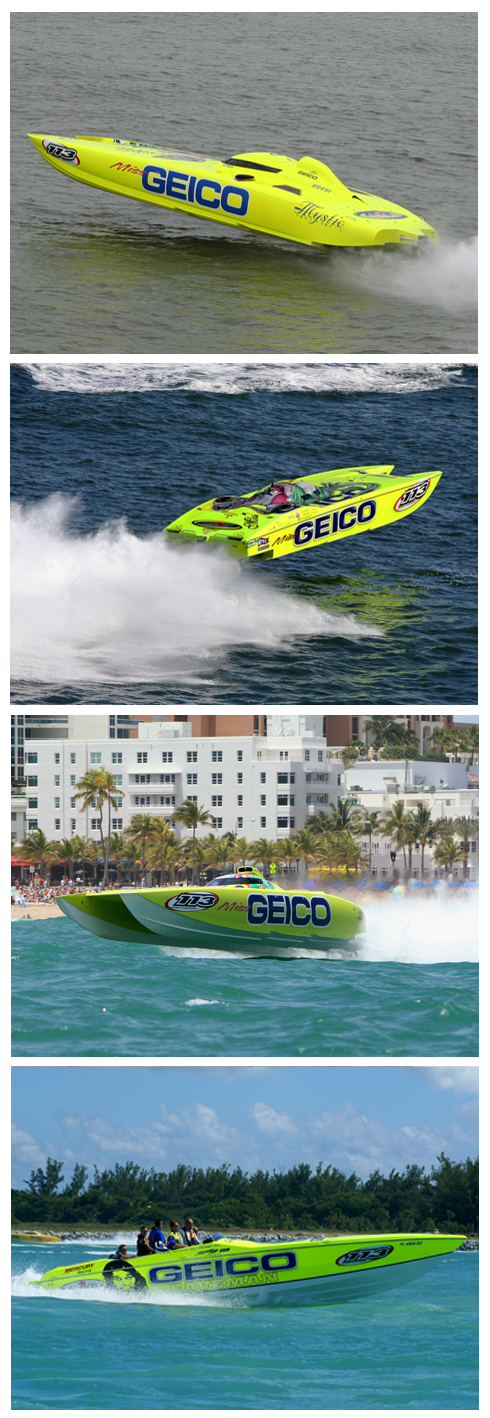
Miss GEICO offshore race boats, Mystic, MTI, Victory boat and the Caveman Cigarette.

=== Miss GEICO #113 ===
Builder: Victory
Materials: Carbon, Kevlar, S Glass
Length: 47 feet
Weight: 11,750
Engines: Mercury Racing 1100 Comp
Top Speed: 160+
Status: Retired

=== 2006 Miss GEICO Mystic #113 ===
Builder: Mystic Powereboats
Materials: Carbon, Kevlar, S Glass
Length: 50 feet
Weight: 10,000 lbs
Type: Jet-A
Engines: Whispering Turbines Inc. T-53 703 series
Horsepower: 2100 x 2
Top Speed: 210+ mph
Status: Total loss

=== 2007 Miss GEICO MTI #113 ===
Builder: Marine Technologies Incorporated
Materials: Composite, Carbon, Epoxy
Length: 44 feet
Beam: 10’ 6
Weight: 10,000 lbs
Fuel: 500 Gal Capacity
Type: Jet- A
Drives: BPM
Engines: Turbine Marine Inc's, Lycoming T-53 703 series
Horsepower: 1850 x 2
Top Speed: 195+ mph
Status: Show boat

=== 2004 Miss GEICO Victory #113 ===
Builder: Victory Hull
Materials: Composite, Carbon, Epoxy
Length: 44 feet
Beam: 11’ 10
Weight: 9,500 lbs
Fuel: 265 Gal Capacity
Type: Jet- A
Drives: BPM
Engines: Mercury Racing twin 1650 piston power
Horsepower: 1650 x 2
Top Speed: 187+ mph

=== 2009 Caveman #113 ===
Builder: Cigarette
Model: Top Gun 38
Materials: Fiberglass
Length: 38 feet
Weight: 9,500 lbs
Drives: Mercury Bravo XR Sportmaster
Engines: Mercury 525 EFI
Horsepower: 1050
Top Speed: 88+ mph

=== 2008 Safety Boat #113 ===
Builder: Cigarette Material: S Glass
Length: 32 feet
Weight: 8,000 lbs
Engines: Mercury Racing 3.2 Stroker
Horsepower: 625
Top Speed: 80 mph

== In media ==
In 2007, the Discovery Channel filmed Miss GEICO for an episode of their series Build It Bigger which premiered September 26. Host Danny traveled to Turbine Marine Inc. in Palm Beach, Florida where he helped the team rebuild one of their boats in order to be ready to compete in a Sarasota race. In 2009, the Miss GEICO boat was featured at all the Kentucky Derby events including Thunder over Louisville, Pegasus Parade, the Oaks and the Derby.

In the sixth episode of the rebooted series of American Chopper, the OCC crew were commissioned to build a motorbike, sold in 2024 to Sean Kerr of the YouTube channel Bikes & Beards, in the spirit of the Miss GEICO boat.
