= Bård Eker =

Norwegian industrial designer and entrepreneur

- Born: 10 October 1961 (age 64); Fredrikstad, Norway
- Education: Master of Industrial Design
- Occupations: Industrial designer and businessman

Bård Eker (born 3 October 1961) is a Norwegian industrial designer and entrepreneur. He is the founder and managing director of the Eker Group, with its wholly or partly owned subsidiaries Eker Design (wholly owned), Projectiondesign as was a successful company Eker sold in year 2009 to Herkules Capital AS. Hydrolift boats is still (wholly owned).

Eker gained publicity in June 2009 for his involvement in the failed purchase of Saab Automobile from General Motors together with Koenigsegg.
