= Pulse compression detonation system =

A pulse compression detonation system (PCD-system) is a combination of pulse detonation and compression systems.

== History ==
A prototype of the PCD-system has been made at the National Technical University Kharkiv Polytechnic Institute in Ukraine in 2017. The measurements of the prototype with the detonation tube diameter of 20 mm and its length of 600 mm were taken. The device was operated using the mixture of atmospheric air and LPG fuel. In 2019 the device started operating on the mixture of atmospheric air and petroleum. The shock wave velocity at the open end of the tube reached 1700 m/s. The frequency of device pulsations was 23-24 Hz. The deflagration-to-detonation transition (DDT) occurred due to the mixture heating and the compression of it.

A cooperation between the National Technical University "Kharkiv Polytechnic Institute" and the University of Warmia and Mazury in Olsztyn started to investigate an efficiency of the PCD-system as a detonation gun for coating technology.

== Construction ==
PCD-system includes the piston compressor 1 with the cylinder 2. The crankshaft 4 connected to the external drive is used for the reciprocal motion of the piston 3. The intake valve 7 arranged inside the intake port 6 of the cylinder head. The air supply system 8 is connected to the port 6. The fuel can be supplied both immediately into the cylinder 2 of the compressor and into the inlet port 6. The detonation tube 9 is connected to the cylinder 2 through the exhaust port 10.

== Principle of operation ==

PCD-system operates in the following way: The crankshaft 4 starts moving in a circular motion by the external drive. During the motion of the piston 3 from the top dead center (TDC) to the bottom dead center (BDC) the intake valve 7 is opened, and the detonable gas mixture is pumped into the cylinder 2 of the compressor 1 through the intake port 6 using the supply system 8. As soon as the BDC is reached the valve 7 is closed. Due to the further motion of the piston 3 from the BDC to the TDC the compression of combustible mixture occurs in the cylinder 2 and in the detonation tube 9. This results in an increase of the density, the temperature, and the pressure of combustible mixture at a closed end of the detonation tube 9 and inside the tube itself. As the piston approaches the TDC the combustible mixture is self-ignited due to the compression of it. Then, the deflagration to the detonation transition occurs in the detonation tube 9. The output of detonation products from the tube 9 happens in a short period of time, when the piston is near the TDC. Then, the process is repeated.

A pulse compression detonation system has been designed to solve the problem of a high-frequency efficient initiation of a detonation in fuel-air mixtures. Instead of the Shchelkin spiral, U-bend tubes and an electrical treatment of detonable mixture, a technique of an ultra-fast pressurized filling of a detonation tube with a preheated detonable gaseous mixture is applied to reduce a time and a length of DDT in the tube.

== Potential uses ==

PCD-system is applied in techniques of a generation of pulsed high-speed hot gas flows and also the acceleration of solid particles and drop-liquid medium. The PCD-system can be used by pulse detonation engines to initiate the detonation, for the detonation coating, to solve the problems related to crushing of minerals, abrasive or water blasting, to produce aerosols, for gas detonation lasers, and as a vibrator machine.

== See also ==
- Index of aviation articles
- Rotating detonation engine

== Notes ==
- The maximal frequency can exceed 100 Hz per one detonation tube.
- The critical tube diameter at which the deflagration-to-detonation transition happens is equal to the detonation cell size λ. For the propane – air mixture λ≈50 mm at normal temperature and pressure.
