= Overall pressure ratio =

Design parameter of gas turbines

In aeronautical engineering, overall pressure ratio, or overall compression ratio, is the number of times the pressure is increased due to ram compression, plus the work done by the compressor stages. The compressor pressure ratio is the ratio of the stagnation pressures at the front and rear of the compressor of a gas turbine.

Overall pressure ratio in a high-bypass turbofan is a function of inlet pressure ratio and compressor pressure ratio:
$$OPR = IPR \times CPR$$

The terms compression ratio and pressure ratio are used interchangeably.

== Advantages of high overall pressure ratios ==
As can be seen in the formula for maximum theoretical thermal efficiency in an ideal Brayton cycle engine, a high pressure ratio leads to higher thermal efficiency:
$$\eta = 1-\left(\frac{1}{PR^\frac{\gamma-1}{\gamma}}\right)$$
where PR is the pressure ratio and gamma the heat capacity ratio of the fluid, 1.4 for air.

Keep in mind that pressure ratio scales exponentially with the number of compressor stages. Imagine a gas turbine with $n$ compressor stages, each one of which compresses the air by a factor $x$. The pressure ratio would therefore equal $x$^{$n$}.

Listed below are the theoretical thermal efficiencies (as calculated using the formula above) associated with various pressure ratios, ignoring all losses due to compression not happening isentropically, viscous drag, as well as the process not taking place perfectly adiabatically.

Theoretical thermal efficiencies associated with a certain pressure ratio
Compressor stages	Pressure ratio	Thermal efficiency	Increase in efficiency effectuated by the additional stage
1	1.35	8.2%	N/A
2	1.82	15.8%	91.783%
3	2.46	22.7%	43.925%
4	3.32	29.0%	28.012%
5	4.48	34.9%	20.084%
6	6.05	40.2%	15.351%
7	8.17	45.1%	12.214%
8	11.03	49.6%	9.990%
9	14.89	53.8%	8.337%
10	20.11	57.6%	7.063%
11	27.14	61.1%	6.055%
12	36.64	64.3%	5.240%
13	49.47	67.2%	4.570%
14	66.78	69.9%	4.011%
15	90.16	72.4%	3.540%
16	121.71	74.6%	3.138%
17	164.31	76.7%	2.792%
18	221.82	78.6%	2.493%
19	299.46	80.4%	2.233%
20	404.27	82.0%	2.004%

Generally speaking, a higher overall pressure ratio implies higher efficiency, but the engine will usually weigh more, so there is a compromise.

A high overall pressure ratio permits a larger area ratio nozzle to be fitted on the jet engine. This means that more of the heat energy is converted to jet speed, and energetic efficiency improves. This is reflected in improvements in the engine's specific fuel consumption.

The GE Catalyst has a 16:1 OPR and its thermal efficiency is 40%, the 32:1 Pratt & Whitney GTF has a thermal efficiency of 50% and the 58:1 GEnx has a thermal efficiency of 58%.

== Disadvantages of high overall pressure ratios ==
One of the primary limiting factors on pressure ratio in modern designs is that the air heats up as it is compressed. As the air travels through the compressor stages it can reach temperatures that pose a material failure risk for the compressor blades. This is especially true for the last compressor stage, and the outlet temperature from this stage is a common figure of merit for engine designs.

Military engines are often forced to work under conditions that maximize the heating load. For instance, the General Dynamics F-111 Aardvark was required to operate at speeds of Mach 1.1 at sea level. As a side-effect of these wide operating conditions, and generally older technology in most cases, military engines typically have lower overall pressure ratios. The Pratt & Whitney TF30 used on the F-111 had a pressure ratio of about 20:1, while newer engines like the General Electric F110 and Pratt & Whitney F135 have improved this to about 30:1.

An additional concern is weight. A higher compression ratio implies a heavier engine, which in turn costs fuel to carry around. Thus, for a particular construction technology and set of flight plans an optimal overall pressure ratio can be determined.

== History of overall pressure ratios ==
Early jet engines had limited pressure ratios due to construction inaccuracies of the compressors and various material limits. For instance, the Junkers Jumo 004 from World War II had an overall pressure ratio 3.14:1. The immediate post-war Snecma Atar improved this marginally to 5.2:1. Improvements in materials, compressor blades, and especially the introduction of multi-spool engines with several different rotational speeds, led to the much higher pressure ratios common today.

Modern civilian engines generally operate between 40 and 55:1. The highest in-service is the General Electric GEnx-1B/75 with an OPR of 58 at the end of the climb to cruise altitude (Top of Climb) and 47 for takeoff at sea level.

== Examples ==
Engine	Overall pressure ratio	Major applications
General Electric GE9X	60:1	777X
Rolls-Royce Trent XWB	52:1	A350 XWB
General Electric GE90	42:1	777
General Electric CF6	30.5:1	747, 767, A300, MD-11, C-5
General Electric F110	30:1	F-14, F-15, F-16
Pratt & Whitney TF30	20:1	F-14, F-111
Rolls-Royce/Snecma Olympus 593	15.5:1/80:1 supersonic	Concorde

== Differences from other similar terms ==
The term should not be confused with the more familiar term compression ratio applied to reciprocating engines. Compression ratio is a ratio of volumes. In the case of the Otto cycle reciprocating engine, the maximum expansion of the charge is limited by the mechanical movement of the pistons (or rotor), and so the compression can be measured by simply comparing the volume of the cylinder with the piston at the top and bottom of its motion. The same is not true of the "open ended" gas turbine, where operational and structural considerations are the limiting factors. Nevertheless, the two terms are similar in that they both offer a quick way of determining overall efficiency relative to other engines of the same class.

Engine pressure ratio (EPR) differs from OPR in that OPR compares the intake pressure to the pressure of the air as it exits the compressor, and is always greater than 1 (often very much so), whereas EPR compares the intake pressure to the pressure at the engine's tailpipe (i.e., after the air has been used for combustion and given up energy to the engine's turbine wheel(s)), and is often less than 1 at low power settings.

The broadly equivalent measure of rocket engine efficiency is chamber pressure/exit pressure, and this ratio can be over 2000 for the Space Shuttle Main Engine.

== See also ==
- Brayton cycle
- Carnot cycle
- Rankine cycle
- Cheng cycle
- Humphrey cycle
- Pressure gain combustion#Humphrey Cycle
- Compression ratio
- Engine pressure ratio (EPR)
