= Pressure gain combustion =

Unsteady state combustion process

Pressure gain combustion (PGC) is the unsteady state process used in gas turbines in which gas expansion caused by heat release is constrained. First developed in the early 20th century as one of the earliest gas turbine designs, the concept was mostly abandoned following the advent of isobaric jet engines in WWII.

As an alternative to conventional gas turbines, pressure gain combustion prevents the expansion of gas by holding it at constant volume during the reaction, causing an increase in stagnation pressure. The subsequent combustion produces a detonation, rather than the deflagration used in most turbines. Doing so allows for extra work extraction rather than a loss of energy due to pressure loss across the turbine.

Several different variations of turbines use this process, the most prominent being the pulse detonation engine and the rotating detonation engine. In recent years, pressure gain combustion has once again gained relevance and is currently being researched for use in propulsion systems and power generation due to its potential for improved efficiency and performance over conventional turbines.

== History ==
=== Early history ===
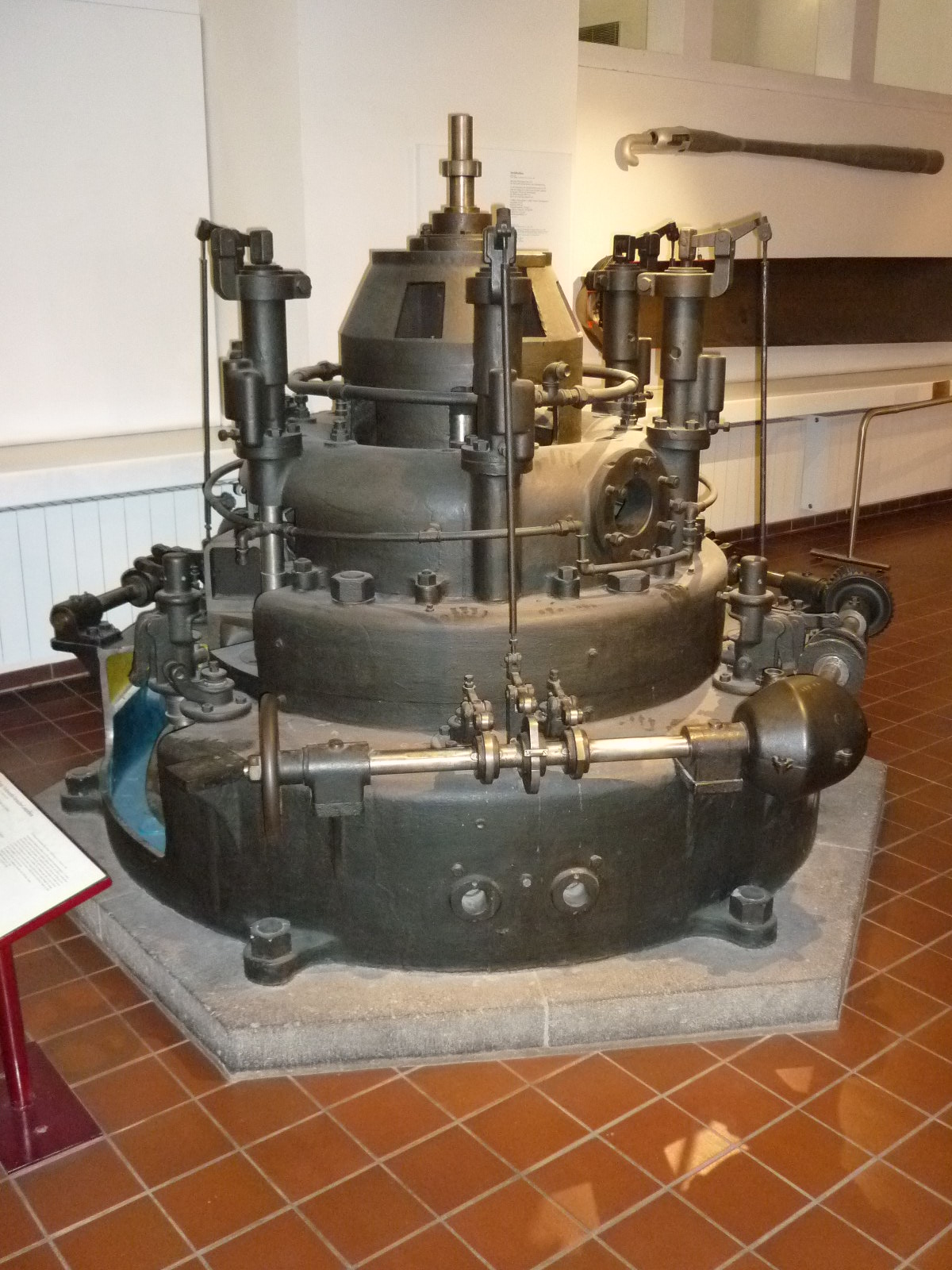
Prototype of the Holzwarth Explosion Turbine.

Gas-powered turbines have been researched since the late 18th century, starting with John Barber's 1791 patent. Over a century later, Ægidius Elling built a turbine in 1903 which generated 11 bhp (8.2 kW), the first gas turbine to produce net positive work. In 1909, the first pressure gain combustion turbine was built by Hans Holzwarth. Initially operating at 200 bhp (147 kW), subsequent improvements to the engine increased its power output to 5000 bhp (3728 kW) by 1939. However, the aptly named Explosion Turbine would lose popularity among engineers and inventors as continuous combustion designs gained traction due to their use in jet engine prototypes.

=== Renewed interest ===
The concept of pulsed propulsion is neither new, nor exclusive to pressure gain combustion. In fact, the German V1 missile utilized a pulse jet operating at 45 Hz. During the space race, NASA's Project Orion concept utilized force from nuclear explosions ignited behind the spacecraft to generate thrust. This process is known as nuclear pulse propulsion and is stylistically similar to the pulse detonation engine.

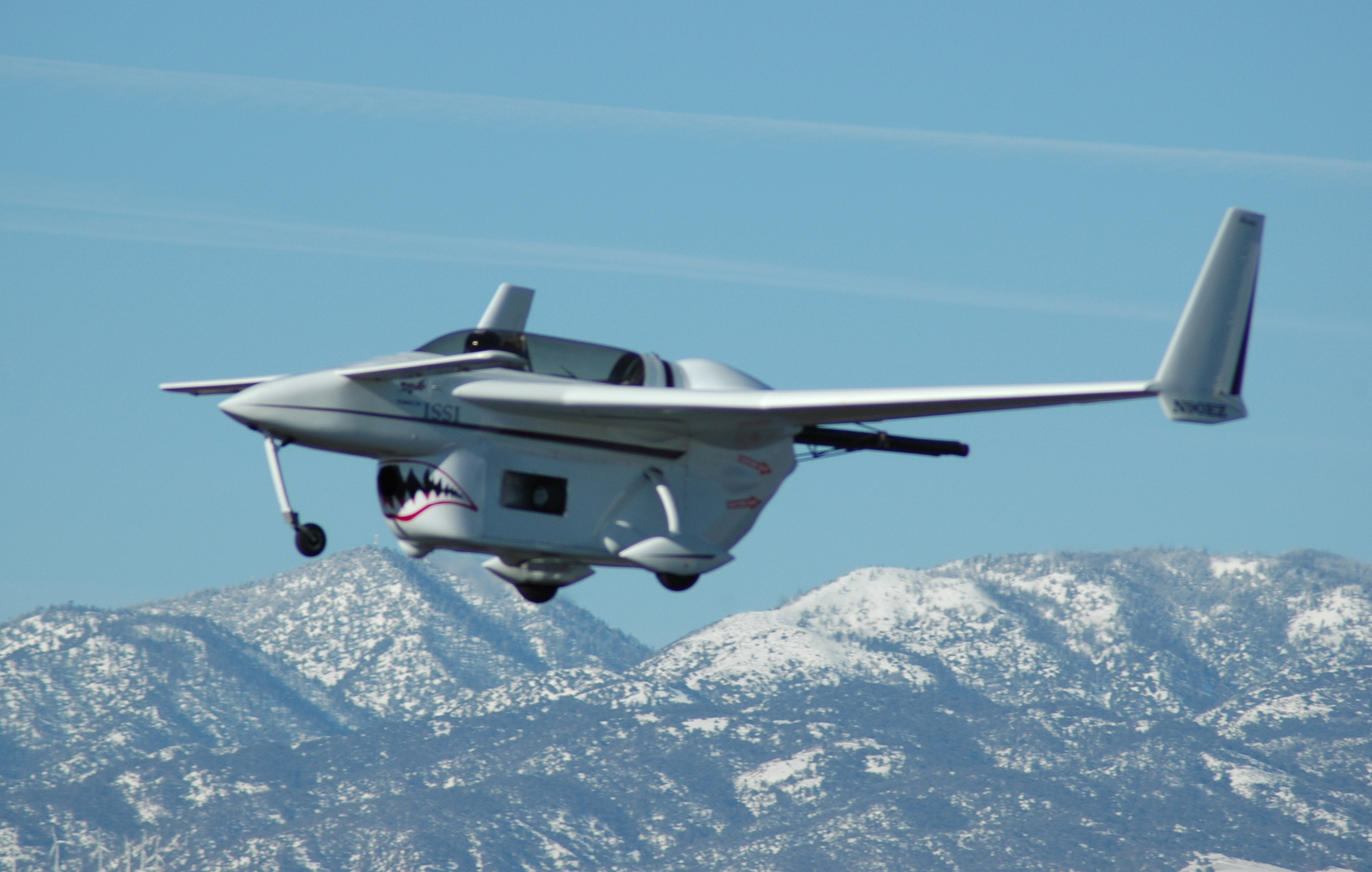
PGC powered aircraft

In the mid-20th century, US aeronautical scientists and engineers were trying to study the properties of detonation waves. To do this, a primitive rotating detonation chamber was created. This development became the basis for the rotating detonation engine, one of the leading PGC engine concepts, although it was largely ignored at the time due to its instability.

However, as gas turbines are becoming more and more optimized, PGC research is now gaining traction in aircraft propulsion, power generation, and even rocket propulsion. In January 2008, a pulse detonation-powered plane completed its first flight as a cooperative project between the Air Force Research Laboratory and Innovative Scientific Solutions, a research and product development company. Currently, various organizations have developed working PGC engines (mostly RDEs), but none have been put to commercial use due to developmental challenges.

== Concept and comparison to conventional turbines ==
=== Overview of conventional turbines ===
From points 2 to 3, the pressure increase stops while volume increases, limiting the net work being done by the Brayton cycle.

The majority of gas turbines consist of an intake through which atmospheric air enters the turbine. The air is then pressurized through a compressor before mixing with fuel. The air-fuel mixture, also known as the working fluid, is combusted in a deflagration (a combustion reaction propagating at subsonic speed), which causes the mixture to expand in volume while maintaining constant pressure. Finally, the combustion product is ejected out of the exhaust to produce thrust. This process is known as the Brayton cycle and has been used as the standard method of jet propulsion and turbine design for about a century.

=== Humphrey cycle ===
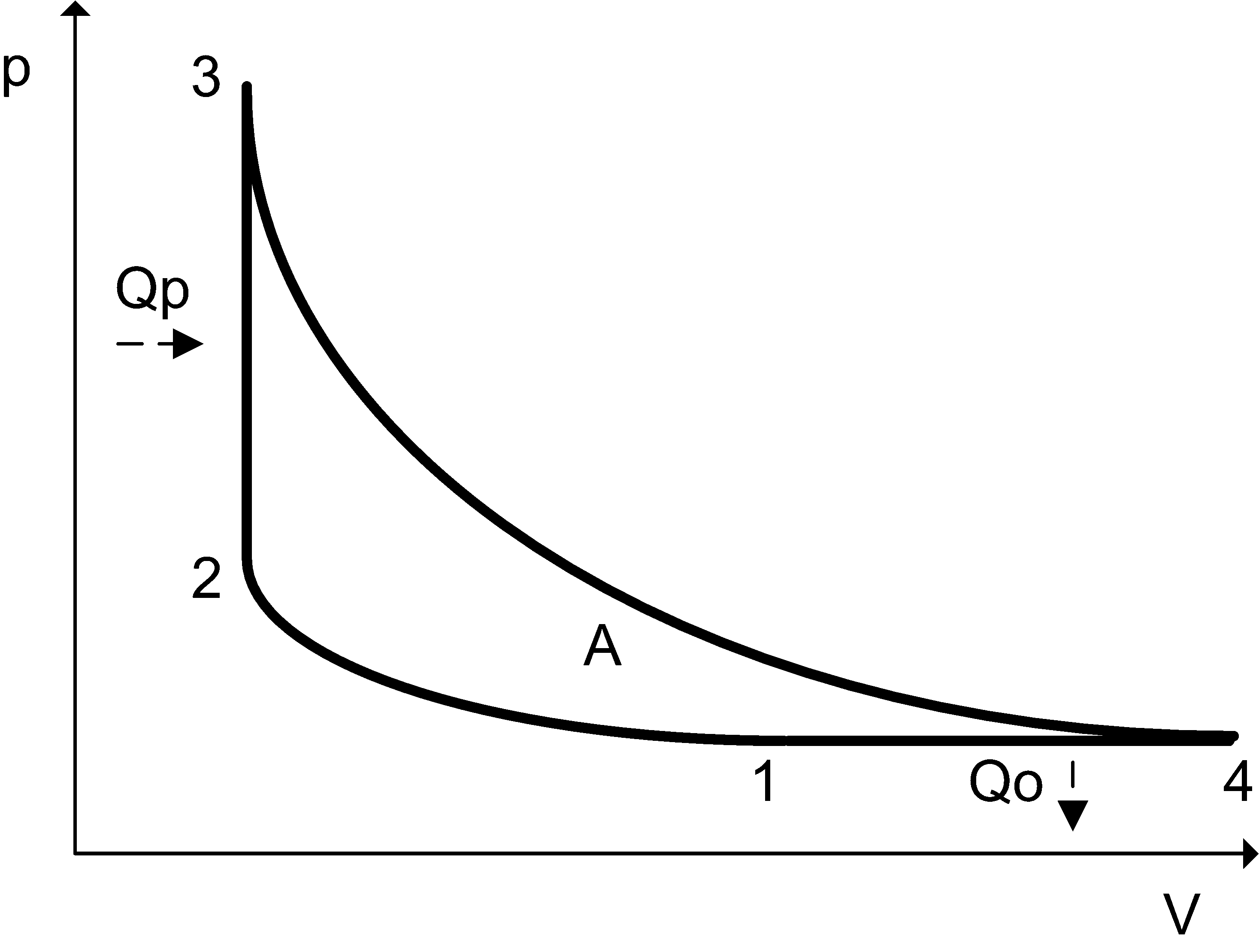
The same pressure to volume graph for the Humphrey cycle shows a pressure increase at constant volume, maximizing its net work.

Contrasting with the Brayton cycle used in most turbines, pressure gain combustion is based on the Humphrey cycle. Instead of an isobaric system in which gas volume expands as heat is added to the combustion chamber, the volume of working fluid stays constant as its pressure increases during combustion. While the Brayton cycle describes a subsonic deflagration, the Humphrey cycle occurs in a detonation (a combustion reaction propagating at supersonic speed). The reaction occurs so quickly that the mixture doesn't have time to expand, causing a pressure gain, before being ejected through the exhaust to produce thrust. The whole process occurs rapidly, and turbines will produce anywhere from 20 to 200 detonations per second.

Because the working fluid is combusting at a constant volume, there is no pressure loss across the turbine, which increases the net work generated by each cycle. However, since work is done by a series of detonations, rather than a constant reaction generating thrust, the process is naturally more unsteady compared to a conventional turbine.

== Designs and variations ==
=== Pulse detonation engine ===
The simplest modern PGC turbine is the Pulse detonation engine. Consisting of almost no moving parts, the PDE is externally similar to a ramjet, a type of jet engine without compressor fans that is viable only at supersonic speeds. First, air enters the intake nozzle and travels directly to the combustion chamber to be mixed with injected fuel. There, the mixture is ignited while the front of the chamber closes, producing a detonation wave which both compresses and combusts the mixture, before the working fluid is ejected at supersonic speeds through the exhaust.

Because of the engine's simplicity and anatomical similarity to ramjets and scramjets, pulse detonation engines can be implemented as a combined-cycle engine, which can improve the performance and reliability of ramjets. Conventional combined-cycle engines have complex moving parts that are essentially rendered useless at high speeds, an issue that PDE/ramjet drives will not have.

=== Rotating detonation engine ===
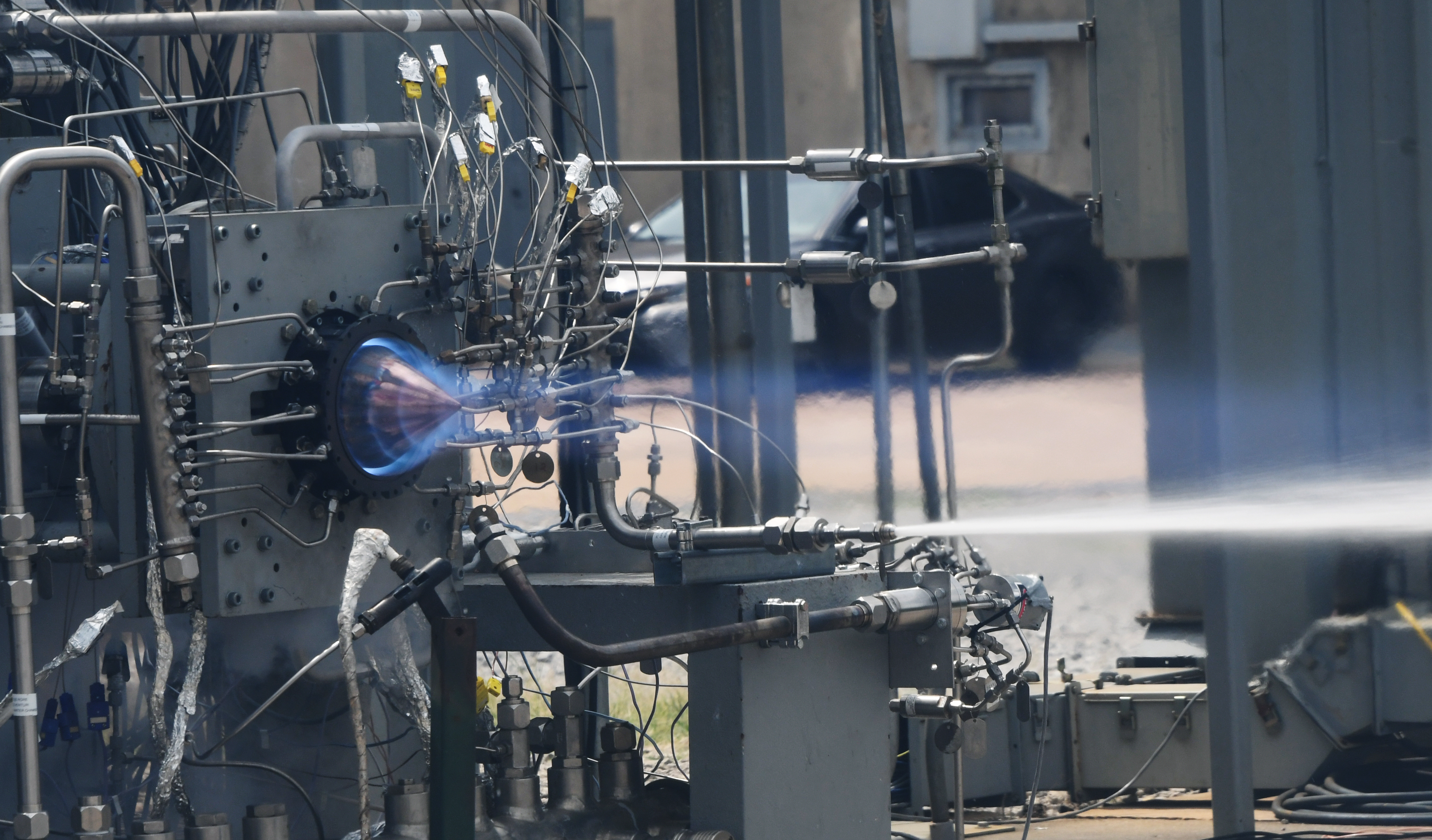
A prototype RDE developed by NASA for rocket propulsion

Apart from PDEs, there exist multiple other PGC engine concepts, including resonant pulse combustors and internal combustion wave rotors. However, the majority of modern PGC research is concentrated around the rotating detonation engine (RDE), which aims to solve many of the issues encountered by PDEs.

The main drawback of pulse detonation is the intermittent nature of the combustions. Not only is the reaction hard to control, but the intermittent combustion also loses power due to the time it takes to refuel the combustion chamber after purging, during which no thrust is produced. The rotating detonation engine aims to address both these problems. While PDEs involve a series of detonations to ignite batches of air that enter the combustion chamber, RDEs can circumvent this by utilizing a single detonation wave that rotates around the space in between concentric cylinders. A continuous air intake flows through the cylinders, which compresses and combusts as it passes through the rotating detonation wave. This eliminates the need to constantly produce detonations since it only uses a single cyclic detonation, and it allows for a steadier constant flow, instead of the pulsing thrust produced by PDEs.

=== Resonant Deflagration Combustor Gas Turbine (R.D.C.T.) ===
The R.D.C.T. - Resonant Deflagration Combustor (gas) Turbine - is a gas turbine engine operating in accordance with Humphrey thermodynamic cycle.

Its main mechanical components are the same of a conventional Brayton cycle gas turbine: a compressor, a turbine, a combustor between compressor outlet and turbine inlet.

The combustion process follows the three-strokes Lenoir thermodynamic cycle, typical of pulse jet engines.

Unlike conventional gas turbines characterized by isobaric combustors, R.D.C.T. heat addition involves deflagrations at frequencies in the hundreds of [Hz]. Each deflagration, occurring in a very short time and being confined within a non-variable volume, can be considered an isochoric process (see portions b-c and 2-3 in the following graphs). Thanks to this mechanism, the combustion increases the pressure of the working fluid, significantly contributing to the engine’s performance. According to the above, R.D.C.T. belongs to the "pressure gain combustion" engines category.

Unlike the pressure gain gas turbines based on cyclic detonations, the R.D.C.T. combustor does not require an electrical system to control ignitions, nor a complex mechanical valves assembly: the combustion, entirely subsonic, is self-sustaining thanks to resonance; the latter is easily achievable by satisfying few geometric parameters, mostly common to the pulsejet design.

==== Advantages with respect to conventional gas turbines ====
The comparison between the ideal Brayton cycle and the ideal Humphrey cycle highlights the advantages offered by the latter.Consistently with the diagram, compared to a conventional (Brayton) gas turbine:

- for a given maximum cycle temperature, R.D.C.T. has higher efficiency (smaller entropy variation);
- for a given entropy change, R.D.C.T. provides a greater amount of energy available for the turbine;
- for a given enthalpy variation across the turbine, R.D.C.T. operates at lower flame temperature, increasing material durability;
- R.D.C.T. reliability is comparable to conventional Gas Turbines because it does not require electrical circuits for ignition control, nor the addition of complex and delicate mechanical parts for pre-compression (required for gas turbines based on detonations);
- significant reduction in NOx emissions thanks to the low flame temperature, high exhaust velocity, and the resulting reduction in the residence time of the combustion products inside the combustion chamber.
- coupling a gas turbine to a pulse jet increases both engines efficiency.

==== Disadvantages with respect to conventional gas turbines ====
- The main disadvantage is related to high-cycle fatigue (HCF) phenomena, potentially induced by pressure pulsations generated by resonant combustion;
- Reducing the combustion temperature causes an increase in CO emissions.

Construction Details (working prototype made by Eridanus Engineering).

From a construction standpoint, the R.D.C.T. combustion chamber is a valveless pulse jet, completely devoid of moving parts. It is fully enclosed within a casing through which the air, coming from compressor’s discharge, flows directly to the turbine: the pulse jet (i.e. the resonating combustor) uses part of such air for its operation. The air by-passing the pulse jet wets the outer surface of the latter; consequently, the pulse jet walls are cooled down, while the enthalpy of the working fluid increases. Thus, the significant heat loss, typical of pulse jets operated as stand-alone engines, is fully recovered by the by-pass air to increase the enthalpy variation of the working fluid.

The volume of the combustor's outer casing, its shape, and the presence of a dedicated flow diverter prevent flame loss and allow the pulse jet to use the optimal amount of air for the Lenoir cycle at any point of the operating envelope.

== Applications and technical challenges ==
=== Propulsion ===
Modern chemical rockets still utilize deflagration reactions to generate thrust, which have been optimized to their limits. As a result, pressure gain combustion engines, mostly RDEs, have garnered attention as a possible method of improving rocket performance. Currently, pressure gain rocket engines are being researched by space agencies in multiple countries, including NASA and JAXA, as well as numerous universities and private companies. Detonation propulsion, which is more energy efficient than conventional deflagration reactions, may increase efficiency by 5-10%, which can both reduce rocket mass and increase payload size.

As mentioned previously, pressure gain turbines have also been researched and developed extensively for use in aircraft propulsion. Pressure gain combustion engines can both improve the performance and reduce the complexity of combined ramjet/scramjet engines through their shared design similarities. This may even allow PDE/RDE combined ramjets to be utilized at conditions unsuitable for conventional ramjets. In addition, pressure gain turbojets require significantly less complexity, especially in the compressors, compared to regular turbines. This will not only save resources in manufacturing but also allow for designs to produce higher thrust in smaller engines.

=== Energy generation ===
Apart from nuclear fission, natural gas contains the highest energy density of widely used fuels. As such, to reduce carbon emissions, electricity-generating plants are increasingly turning to gas turbines from crude oil and coal. While conventional turbines generate large amounts of energy more efficiently than other fossil fuels, just as in aerospace, they are beginning to reach their limits.

Similar to its potential use in propulsion, pressure gain combustion turbines can offer an improvement to gas power plants. In addition to better efficiency, RDEs can operate at much higher hydrogen concentrations, further improving performance because of hydrogen's higher energy density compared to petrochemicals. The relative simplicity of RDEs can also improve reliability and ease of maintenance, though that may be counterbalanced by the increased stress put on the engine by the process itself.

=== Engineering and implementation challenges ===
While PGC offers improved performance and efficiency, there are serious flaws and challenges that researchers were initially unable to solve, preventing the technology from being widely used.

Since PDEs are effectively intermittent explosion drives, the cycle they run on is far more unsteady and harder to control than conventional turbines. This makes PDEs very difficult to integrate into airframes, as the high energy pulsing of the engine can cause the inlet to unstart and stop the reaction, in addition to putting high stress on the nacelle or any other adjacent parts. The noise from the exhaust is also a concern. In testing, the highly energetic detonations produced up to 122 dB at a distance of 3 m in a 20 Hz PDE. For scaled-up commercial units operating at higher power and frequency, noise pollution will be a serious issue if effective damping measures are not implemented.

Moreover, due to the high energy required to initiate detonations, PDEs with shorter combustion chambers will need to utilize deflagration combustion at initial ignition and accelerate pressure waves through a process called deflagration to detonation transition (DDT). This requires placing obstacles in the path of the deflagration wave to induce turbulent flow, which speeds up the wave but requires more complexity in the engine structure.

While RDEs solve many of the problems encountered in PDEs they aren't without their flaws. The constant flow of the engine, coupled with the need to sustain the detonation, requires a tremendous intake of air to be rapidly mixed with the fuel in a shorter distance than most PDEs, which are normally quite elongated. In addition, the stress placed on the engine by the detonation process was simply too much for the engine to withstand during the early years of development. However, advancements in materials science and manufacturing processes have improved the feasibility of RDEs to the point where research and development is believed to be worthwhile by many organizations.

== See also ==
- Nuclear pulse propulsion
- Pulsejet
- Pulse detonation engine
- Rotating detonation engine
- Shcramjet
