= Humphrey cycle =

Thermodynamic cycle

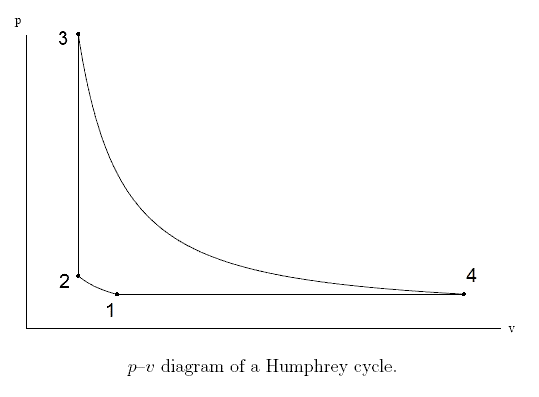
The pressure-volume diagram of an idealized Humphrey cycle

The Humphrey cycle is the thermodynamic cycle occurring within detonation engines such as rotating detonation engines, the pulse detonation engines, and pulse compression detonation systems. It may be considered to be a modification of the Brayton cycle in which the constant-pressure heat addition process of the Brayton cycle is replaced by a constant-volume (isochoric process) heat addition process. It is a form of pressure gain combustion.

Hence, the ideal Humphrey cycle consists of 4 processes:

1. Reversible, adiabatic (isentropic) compression of the incoming gas. During this step incoming gas is compressed, usually by turbomachinery. Stagnation pressure and temperature increase because of the work done on the gas by the compressor. Entropy is unchanged. Static pressure and density of the gas increase.
2. Constant-volume heat addition. In this step, heat is added while the gas is kept at constant volume. In most cases, Humphrey-cycle engines are considered open cycles (meaning that air flows through continuously) which makes it difficult to have a "constant volume" during the addition of heat. Hence, instead of the flame front moving subsonically (deflagration, which is what takes place in Brayton cycle (constant pressure heat addition) engines), the combustion mode is detonative (meaning the flame travels faster than the local speed of sound). In being detonative, the heat addition happens only for a small sector volume of premixture (in a combustor annulus) at a constant volume, while the remaining sections refill the chamber with fresh incoming premixture. This method allows for continuous flow in the system while at the same time achieving the pseudo constant volume requirement for the heat addition process.
3. Reversible, adiabatic (isentropic) expansion of the gas. During this step incoming gas is expanded, usually by turbomachinery. Stagnation pressure and temperature decrease because of the work extracted from the gas by the turbine. Entropy is unchanged. Static pressure and density of the gas decrease.
4. Constant-pressure heat rejection. In this step, heat is removed from the working fluid while the fluid remains at constant pressure. In open-cycle engines this process usually represents expulsion of the gas from the engine, where it quickly equalizes to ambient pressure and slowly loses heat to the atmosphere, which is considered to be an infinitely large reservoir for heat storage, with constant pressure and temperature.
