= 1970 propane vapor cloud explosion in Port Hudson =

Coordinates: 38.41°N 91.08°W

The 1970 propane vapor cloud explosion in Port Hudson in Missouri resulted from a propane pipeline break, which led to the formation of a large, dense vapor cloud. Upon ignition, the vapor cloud exploded with tremendous force. Both near- and far-field damage indicate that this explosion may be attributed to the detonation of propane in air with an energy release equivalent to that from about 50 tons of detonating trinitrotoluene (TNT). The violence of the explosion is likely unprecedented. As such, the accident is widely quoted as one of the first, if not the first, confirmed accidental occurrences of an unconfined vapor cloud deflagration that turns into a detonation - a so-called deflagration to detonation transition. The accident represents a "worst-possible" sort of case history for assessment of the hazards of fuel transportation.

The accident took place in Port Hudson, Franklin County, Missouri, on December 9, 1970. The pipeline was owned by Phillips Pipeline Company.

== See also ==
- Unconfined vapor cloud explosion
- 2005 Hertfordshire Oil Storage Terminal fire (Buncefield disaster)
- Ufa train disaster

== Sources ==
- Burgess, DS; Zabetakis, MG (1973), Detonation of a flammable cloud following a propane pipeline break: the December 9, 1970, explosion in Port Hudson, Mo. (Technical Report BM-RI-7752), Bureau of Mines, Pittsburgh, Pa. (USA). Pittsburgh Mining and Safety Research Center., OSTI 7351990
