= Shchelkin spiral =

The Shchelkin spiral is a device that assists the transition from deflagration (subsonic combustion) to detonation in a pulse detonation engine. The spiral is named after Kirill Ivanovich Shchelkin, a Russian physicist who described it in his 1965 book Gas Dynamics of Combustion.

In pulse detonation engines, direct detonation of the combustible mixture can be relatively straightforward, but require more energy than when detonation is preceded by deflagration. The deflagration to detonation transition (DDT) must however occur within the length of the detonation tube, which can be solved by providing the Shchelkin spiral. The Shchelkin spiral acts as an obstacle by creating a partial blockage of the detonation tube, effectively shortening the distance along the detonation tube in which the transition occurs.
