= James Arthur Nicholls =

American aerospace engineer and detonation engine pioneer

James Arthur Nicholls (February 12, 1921 – October 9, 2018) was an American aerospace engineer and professor at the University of Michigan known for his work in detonation physics, rocket engine combustion instability, and rotating detonation engines. He was the first researcher to experimentally create a standing detonation wave, laying the foundation for subsequent research in pulse detonation and rotating detonation propulsion. He served as a faculty member in the university's Department of Aerospace Engineering for over 27 years and led the Gas Dynamics Laboratory from 1966 to 1985.

== Early life and education ==
Nicholls was born on February 12, 1921. During World War II, he served as a combat pilot in the United States Navy, flying multi-engine aircraft in the North Pacific theater. Following his military service, he pursued graduate studies in aeronautical engineering at the University of Michigan, earning a Master of Science degree in 1951 and a Ph.D. in 1960.

== Academic career ==
After completing his doctoral studies, Nicholls joined the faculty of the University of Michigan's Department of Aeronautical Engineering (later Aerospace Engineering) in 1960. He became director of the university's Gas Dynamics Laboratory in 1966, a position he held until 1985.

Nicholls published over 100 research papers during his career and advised Ph.D. students. He contributed to the development of detonation-based propulsion systems and was among the earliest researchers to explore the concept of standing and rotating detonation waves for propulsion.

Nicholls received the Stephen S. Attwood Excellence in Engineering Award, awarded by the University of Michigan College of Engineering, recognizing his achievements in teaching, research, and service. He retired with the title of Emeritus Professor.

== Death and legacy ==
James A. Nicholls died on October 9, 2018.

In 2025, the named chair of James Arthur Nicholls Collegiate Professor of Engineering was established at the University of Michigan in his honour, and Venkat Raman was appointed to the position as its first holder.

== See also ==
- Pulse detonation engine
- Combustion chamber
- Gas dynamics
