= Zeldovich spontaneous wave =

A Zeldovich spontaneous wave, also known as the Zeldovich gradient mechanism, is a theoretical type of reaction wave that can occur in a reacting substance, such as a gas mixture, where the initial temperature varies across different locations. This variation in temperature creates gradients that cause different parts of the substance to react at slightly different times, driving the wave's propagation. Unlike typical combustion waves, such as subsonic deflagrations and supersonic detonations, it's characterized by the absence of interactions between different parts of the substance, such as those caused by pressure changes or heat transfer.

Introduced by Yakov Zeldovich in 1980 building on his earlier research, this concept is often cited to explain the yet-unsolved problem of deflagration to detonation transition (DDT), where a slow-moving subsonic flame (deflagration) accelerates to a supersonic detonation. Essentially, the Zeldovich spontaneous wave helps explain how a reaction can spread solely due to initial temperature differences, independent of factors like heat conduction or sound speed (provided the initial temperature gradients are small). While it simplifies real-world conditions by neglecting gas dynamic effects, it offers valuable insights into the fundamental mechanisms of rapid reactions. The wave's behavior is dependent on the initial temperature distribution.

== Description of the spontaneous reaction wave ==
Let $T(x,y,z)$ be the initial temperature distribution, which is non trivial, indicating that chemical reactions at different points in space proceed at different rates. To this distribution, we can associate a function $t_{ad}(x,y,z)$, where $t_{ad}$ is the adiabatic induction period. Now, define in space some surface $t_{ad}(x,y,z)=\mathrm{const.}$; suppose if $T=T(x)$, then this surface for some constant will be parallel to $yz$-plane. Examine the change of position of this surface with the passage of time according to

$$t_{ad}(x,y,z)=t.$$

From this, we can easily extract the direction and the propagation speed of the spontaneous front. The direction of the wave is clearly normal to this surface which is given by $\nabla t_{ad}/|\nabla t_{ad}|$ and the rate of propagation is just the magnitude of inverse of the gradient of $t_{ad}$:

$$\mathbf{u}_{sp} = \frac{\nabla t_{ad}}{|\nabla t_{ad}|^2}, \quad u_{sp} = |\mathbf{u}_{up}|=\frac{1}{|\nabla t_{ad}|}.$$

Note that adiabatic thermal runaways at different places are not casually connected events and therefore $u_{sp}$ can assume, in principle, any positive value. By comparing $u_{sp}$ with other relevant speeds such as, the deflagration speed, $u_f$, the sound speed, $c$ and the speed of the Chapman–Jouguet detonation wave, $u_{CJ}$, we can identify different regimes:

- When $u_{sp}<u_f$, the spontaneous wave is not possible. Suppose a rapid reaction for a fluid element at some time $t_1$. The spontaneous wave reaches the adjacent element located $x_{21}$ distance apart from the first one at a time $t_2=t_1 + x_{21}/u_{sp}$. However, before this wave arrives, heat conduction via the deflagration wave would have arrived and already initiated the chemical reaction. Thus, heat conduction is not negligible for this case and therefore spontaneous wave is not possible.
- Consider now the case $u_f<u_{sp}\ll c<u_{CJ}$. The spontaneous wave propagates sufficiently faster so that heat conduction is negligible. Moreover, since $u_{sp}\ll c$, the gas medium has sufficient time to equalize the pressure in that gas motion that arises are always subsonic. The inverse effect of the gas motion on the adiabatic induction period is negligible. Mathematically, this regime is identical to the KPP regime.
- Next let us consider the case $c\sim u_{sp}<u_{CJ}$. The gas pressure does not have enough time to equalize and thus a shock wave forms which after some transient evolution, transitions to a detonation wave. This regime is identified as the Zeldovich's gradient mechanism that explains the DDT.
- Finally, consider $u_{sp}>u_{CJ}$. This regime is similar to the weak detonation wave (such waves are not observed experimentally in combustion systems, although in principle, it is allowed) in which the pressure behind the wave is smaller than it would be in the Chapman–Jouguet wave.
