= Fickett–Jacobs cycle =

Thermodynamic cycle

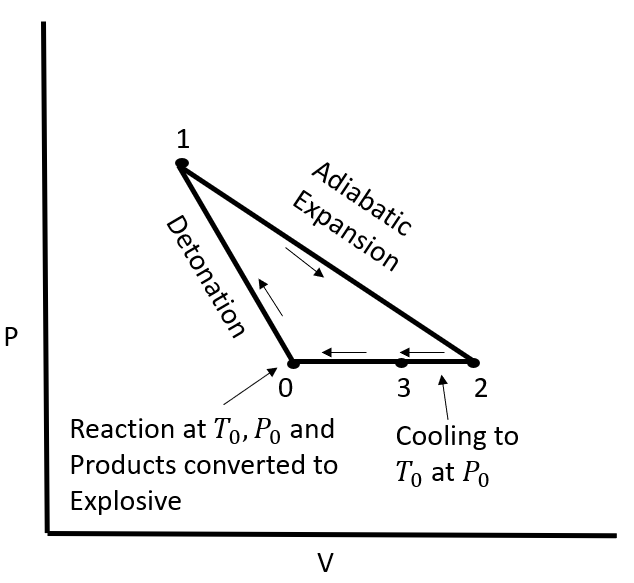
Figure 1: Diagram for the Fickett–Jacobs quasistatic cycle for detonation. The paths drawn represent the series of equilibrium states occupied by the system, except during the detonation process, (step 0 to 1), the system is temporarily non-uniform. Nevertheless, the beginning and at the end of the detonation process is uniform.

The Fickett–Jacobs cycle is a conceptual thermodynamic cycle that allows to compute an upper limit to the amount of mechanical work obtained from a cycle using an unsteady detonation process (explosive). The Fickett–Jacobs (FJ) cycle is based on Chapman–Jouguet (CJ) theory, an approximation for the detonation wave's velocity during a detonation. This cycle is researched for rotating detonation engines (RDE), considered to be more efficient than the classical combustion engines that are based on the Brayton or Humphrey cycles.

The FJ cycle for detonation is an elaboration of the original ideas of Jacobs (1956). The first to propose applying thermodynamic cycles to detonation was Yakov Zeldovich in 1940. In his work, he concluded that the efficiency of the detonation cycle is slightly larger than that of previous constant-volume combustion cycles. Zeldovich's ideas were not known to Jacbos or Fickett.

Since 1940, serious attempts have been discussed for detonating propulsion systems, nevertheless, until today, no practical approach has been found. Detonation is the process by which material is very rapidly burned and converted into energy (extremely high combustion rate). The major difficulty involved in the process is the necessity to rapidly mix the fuel and air at high speeds and sustaining the detonation in a controllable manner.

== Thermodynamic cycle model ==
The FJ cycle is based on a closed piston-cylinder where the reactants and explosion products are constantly contained inside. The explosives, pistons, and cylinder define the closed thermodynamic system. In addition, the cylinder and the pistons are assumed to be rigid, massless, and adiabatic.

The ideal FJ cycle consists of five processes:

1. Reactants are isentropically compressed: Applying external work to move one piston at velocity u_{p} instantaneously initiating a detonation front at the piston's surface. The detonation wave propagates, and the decomposition products follows it in a uniform state at velocity u_{p}. Once it reaches the second piston, the entire piston-cylinder arrangement moves at a constant velocity u_{p}.
2. The kinetic energy produced during the first process is converted into external work.
3. Adiabatical expansion: The gaseous detonation products return to a final pressure equal to the initial pressure, Ρ_{0}.
4. Heat extraction: The gaseous products are reversibly cooled at a constant pressure to reach the initial temperature Τ_{0}.
5. The cycle is completed by converting the products into reactants, as in the initial conditions.

The entire cycle is shown in Figure 1.

The net work done by the system is equal to the sum of the work done during each step of the cycle. Since all processes in the cycles shown in Figure 2 are reversible, except for the detonation process, the work computed is an upper limit to the work that can be obtained during any cyclic process with a propagating detonation as the combustion step.

== Mathematical interpretation of the cycle's total work ==
In the following equations, all subscripts correspond to the different steps in the Fickett–Jacobs cycle as shown in Figure 2. In addition, a representation of the work done by the system and the external work applied on the system is shown is Figure 1.

Initially, the work done to the system to begin a cycling detonation is

$W_i = -P_i A u_p(t-t_0)$

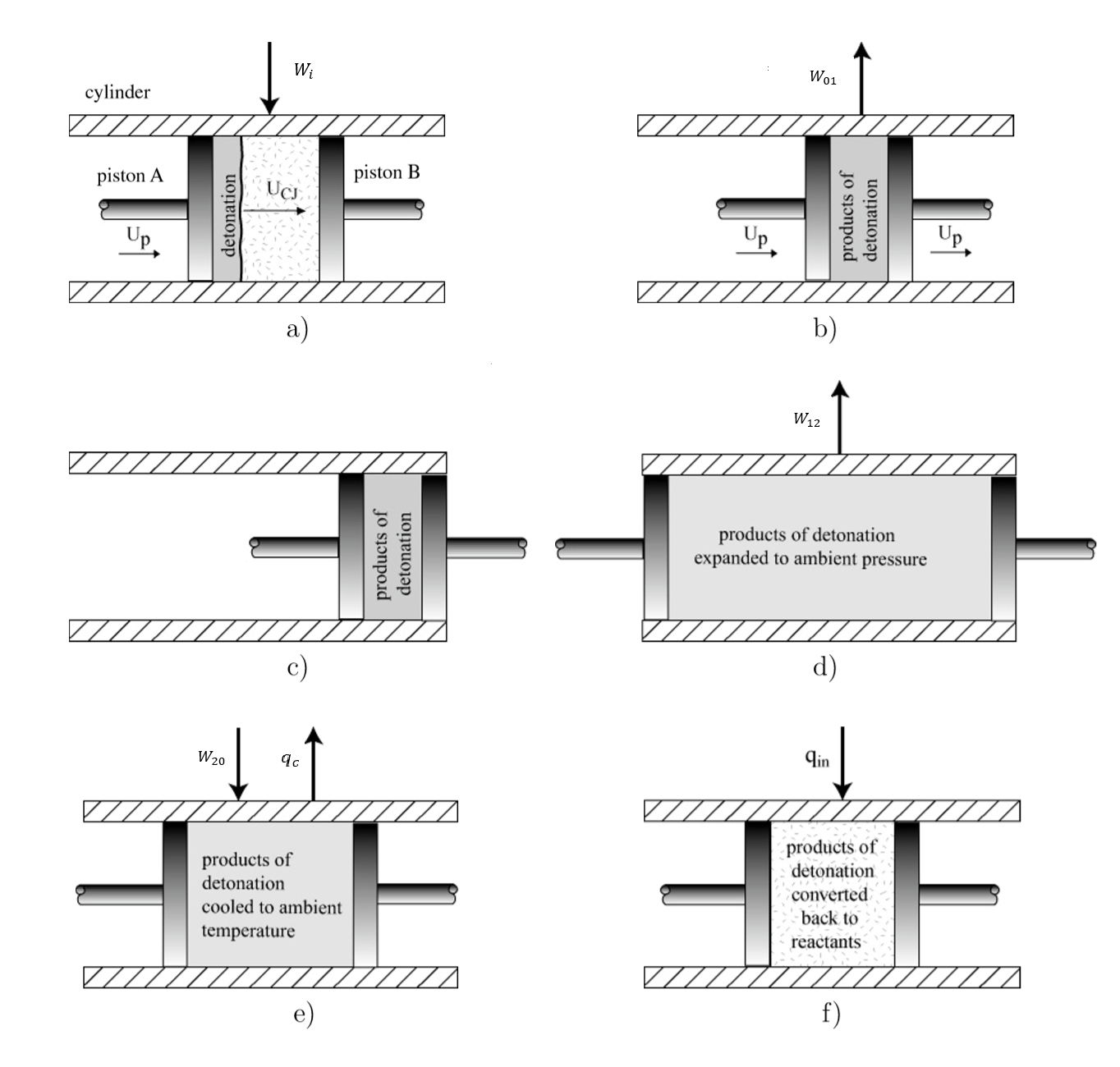
Figure 2: A schematic representation of the different steps in the Fickett–Jacobs cycle. a) Applying external force to move the piston at velocity u_{p}, and simultaneous detonation of the explosives (U_{CJ} is the speed of the wave front of the detonation) . b) Acceleration of piston Α to the right. c) Conversion of mechanical work to external work by decelerating the detonation products. d) Expansion of the products to atmospheric pressure. e) Heat extraction and constant pressure. f) Conversion of products to reactants at constant temperature and pressure.

Where Ρ_{i} is the initial pressure applied to unit area Α and velocity u_{p} from time $t-t_0$. The time to reach the end of the cylinder is calculated using length L of the cylinder and the propagation wave's velocity (approximated by Chapman–Jouguet ), U_{CJ}: $t-t_0 = \frac{L}{U_{CJ}}$. The fact that the mass of the explosive is $M = \rho L A$, where ρ is the explosive's density, the equation above becomes

$W_i = - \frac{P_i u_p}{\rho U_{CJ}}$

The work done by the system (detonation) per unit mass of explosive is

$W_{01} = \frac{1}{2}u_{p}^2$

The work done by the adiabatic expansion of the reaction products is

$W_{12} = \int_{V_1}^{V_2} PdV$

Where Ρ is the pressure on the isentrope through state 1, and V_{2} is the specific volume on that isentrope at the initial pressure Ρ_{0}.

The work done through steps 2 to 0 (including 3) was considered by Fickett to be negligible, nevertheless, it is added in order to have a complete thermodynamic cycle and be consistent with the First Law of Thermodynamics. The additional work is

$W_{20} = -P_0(V_0 - V_2)$

The total work done by the system is then

$W_{tot} = W_i + W_{01} + W_{12} + W_{20} = W_i + H_0 - H_2$

Where $H_0 - H_2$ is the enthalpy difference between steps 0 to 2 (passing through step 3).

=== Thermal efficiency ===
The thermal efficiency of the FJ cycle is the ratio between the net work done to the specific heat of combustion.

$\eta = \frac{W_{tot}}{q_c} = \frac{H_0 - H_2}{q_c}$

Where q_{c} is the specific heat of combustion, defined as the enthalpy difference between the reactants and the products at initial pressure and temperature: $q_c = H_0 - H_3$.

The FJ cycle overall shows the amount of work available from a detonating system.

The thermal efficiency for the FJ cycle is shown to be dependent on its initial pressure. The thermal efficiency decreases when the initial pressure decreases due to the increasing in dissociation at low pressures. Dissociation is an endothermic process, hence reducing the amount of energy released in a detonation or the maximum amount of work that can be obtained from the FJ cycle. Exothermic reactions are encouraged when increasing the initial pressure of the system, hence, increasing the amount of work generated during the FJ cycle.

== See also ==
- Thermodynamic cycle
- Humphrey cycle
- Brayton cycle
