= Kirill Shchelkin =

Soviet physicist (1911–1968)

- Кирилл Щёлкин; Կիրակոս Մետաքսյան
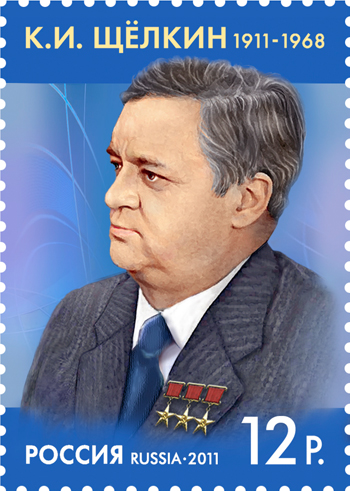
- 2011 Russian stamp
- Born: Kirakos Hovhanesi Metaksian; 17 May 1911; Tbilisi, Russian Empire
- Died: 8 November 1968 (aged 57); Moscow, Russian SFSR, Soviet Union
- Education: M. V. Frunze Crimean State Pedagogical Institute
- Known for: First scientific director at Chelyabinsk-70, Soviet program of nuclear weapons, detonation, explosives
- Awards: Hero of Socialist Labor (1949,1951,1954)
- Scientific career
- Fields: Physics
- Workplaces: Arzamas-16; Chelyabinsk-70

Kirill Ivanovich Shchelkin (Russian: Кирилл Иванович Щёлкин; born Kirakos Hovhanesi Metaksian; 17 May [O.S. 4 May] 1911 – 8 November 1968) was a Soviet physicist of Armenian origin in the former Soviet program of nuclear weapons who made theoretical and experimental contribution in combustion and gas dynamics.

He was notable for his work on the detonation process of the first Soviet nuclear weapon, the RDS-1, and the first thermonuclear device, and for his role as the first scientific director of the Soviet nuclear weapons development center in the Urals at Chelyabinsk-70.

== Life and career ==
He was born in Tbilisi, Russian Empire, and baptised at home by an Armenian Orthodox priest. Armenian by nationality. He lived in the Caucasus as a young child. When he was aged seven, his family moved to Krasny, where his father – a land surveyor and his mother, a teacher, both of ethnic Russian extraction – came from. In 1924, his family moved to Karasubazar (now Belogorsk) in the Crimea because his father was suffering from tuberculosis. When his father succumbed to the disease in 1926, the 15-year-old pupil Shchelkin also had to work to support his family. In 1928, he enrolled at the Crimean Pedagogical Institute in the faculty of Physics and Technology, graduating in 1932.

After graduation, he was invited to join the Institute of Chemical Physics of the USSR Academy of Sciences in Leningrad as a laboratory assistant. Here he first met Igor Kurchatov, who was to become an important supporter. He researched combustion processes, specifically the suppression of methane explosions in coal mines and suppressing the detonation of fuel-air mixtures in the cylinders of internal combustion engines. In May 1934, scientist published an article in the Journal of Experimental and Theoretical Physics in which he described calculating the frequency of rotation in the newly studied phenomenon known as spin detonation, where the flame front in combustible gaseous mixtures advances (for example) in a spiral manner along a cylinder, which drew the attention of combustion specialists. He also wrote about experiments concerning the effect of irregularities in the walls of mine workings which caused turbulence that could accelerate flame propagation should combustion occur if the chambers were filled with combustible gases. He gained his Ph.D. in December 1938 with a thesis presented to the academy: “On the theory of the onset of detonation in gas mixtures”. Yakov Zel'dovich, an expert in the field, was one of a number of scientists who argued with Shchelkin from the point of view of chemical kinetics made more complex by thermal effects – as opposed to Shchelkin's gas dynamics – but he conceded that Shchelkin's bravery produced exceptional experimental results.

Shchelkin's plans for further research and a further dissertation were interrupted by the Nazi's attack on the Soviet Union. He volunteered and was in the platoon of artillery intelligence of the 64th rifles division, engaged in the fighting to protect Moscow. In 1942, he was ordered to return to the Institute of Chemical Physics (which was evacuated to Kazan) by the Deputy People's Commissar for Defense, Yevgeny Schadenko. He was engaged in research into combustion in jet engines. In 1943, the Institute returned to Moscow, and the following year he was appointed head of the laboratory. In 1946, he wrote a final thesis, "Fast burning and spin detonation" (also published as a monograph in 1949). He was invited to be deputy director of the Institute for Physical Problems at the academy, but he turned down the offer to continue scientific research. Shortly after this, however, he was part of a special committee which discussed the formation of a second nuclear weapons research centre, which became known as Laboratory B, on a peninsula of Lake Sungul, where he worked as part of KB-11 (a secret nuclear weapons development facility based in Sarov, now the All-Russian Scientific Research Institute of Experimental Physics), and where German scientific knowledge was exploited as part of the "Russian Alsos". In 1949, at the test-site in Semipalatinsk, Kazakhstan, Shchelkin supervised the placement of the first Soviet nuclear device on the tower, put the detonating cap on the sphere of plutonium himself (and supervised the later ones). For this success, he received the Hero of Socialist Labour award; several others followed in ensuing years, including for work on the first Soviet thermonuclear weapon.

Remaining on good terms with Igor Kurchatov, Shchelkin's knowledge, experience, managerial and business sense led to his recommendation as the first scientific director and chief designer of the new "second installation" for development of nuclear weapons at NII-1011 (also becoming known as Chelyabinsk-70 (now the All-Russian Scientific Research Institute for Technical Physics (VNIITF)), where research and development began in 1955. He was also overall scientific director Yulii Khariton's deputy. He was sometimes openly critical of directives, which upset first secretary Nikita Khrushchev, and he had a disputes with Efim Slavsky, the minister in charge of Ministry of Medium Machine Building which oversaw the nuclear programme. He received the Lenin Prize with his fellow researchers in 1958 after developing a new charge at NII-1011. The first weaponised Soviet nuclear charges were developed there shortly afterwards.

Shchelkin continued to travel between Moscow, KB-11 and the laboratories in the Urals, planning expansions to or closures of sites as necessary and recruiting new staff, but he retired from his directorship in 1960 because of increasing ill health – he had suffered frequent heart attacks in 1959. He continued to publish in scientific journals, was active in popularising Science, and wrote books such as The Physics of the Microworld and Gas Dynamics of Combustion, both published in 1965.

He died on 8 November 1968 in Moscow, and was buried in Novodevichy cemetery.

== Awards and legacy ==
- 1949, 1951, 1953: 3 times Hero of Socialist Labour.
- 1949, 1951, 1953: 3 times Stalin Prize.
- 1953: Order of the Red Banner of Labour.
- 1953: Corresponding member of the USSR Academy of Sciences.
- 1958: Lenin Prize.

The city of Shchelkino in the Crimea, constructed in 1978 for workers of the nuclear power station, was named in his honour. In Snezhinsk, an avenue is named after him and located there are two commemorative plaques. A monument to him was opened in Snezhinksk in May 2011; the same year, a Russian postage stamp (illustrated above) of 2011 bore his portrait.

The rotating flame front in cylinders of detonating gas is known as the Shchelkin spiral and research continues into its usage in propulsion.
