= Deflagration to detonation transition =

Type of explosion

Deflagration to detonation transition (DDT) refers to a phenomenon in which a combustion process transitions from deflagration (subsonic flame propagation) to a detonation (supersonic shock-coupled combustion). In a deflagration the flame front grows through heat transfer and diffusion at speeds that are below the speed of sound. This is often contrasted with detonation, during which a shock wave compresses areas of unreacted mixture, thereby igniting it. This allows the reaction to grow at supersonic speeds. The transition between deflagration and detonation is a complex, multi-stage process that involves flame acceleration, turbulence development, and shockwave formation. It is an important part of industrial safety and propulsion systems, pulse detonation engines in particular.

== Description ==
A deflagration is characterized by a subsonic flame propagation velocity, typically far below 100 metres per second (220 mph), and relatively modest overpressures, typically below 50 kilopascals (7.3 psi). It is primarily driven by thermal conduction and molecular diffusion. With relatively gradual pressure increases and the absence of a strong shock wave. The main mechanism of combustion propagation is of a flame front that moves forward through the gas mixture; in technical terms, the reaction zone (chemical combustion) progresses through the medium by processes of diffusion of heat and mass. In its most benign form, a deflagration may simply be a flash fire.

A detonation is characterized by supersonic flame propagation and the presence of a leading shockwave, which compresses and heats any unreacted materials, causing nearly instant combustion. This results in a higher pressure rise and energy release compared to deflagration. Detonation typically propagates at velocities of up to 2,000 metres per second (4,500 mph), and produce substantial overpressures, up to 2 megapascals (290 psi). The main mechanism of detonation propagation is of a powerful pressure wave that compresses the unburnt gas ahead of the wave to a temperature above the autoignition temperature. In technical terms, the reaction zone (chemical combustion) is a self-driven shock wave where the reaction zone and the shock are coincident, and the chemical reaction is initiated by the compressive heating caused by the shock wave. The process is similar to ignition in a Diesel engine, but much more sudden and violent.

Under certain conditions, mainly in terms of geometrical conditions (such as partial confinement and many obstacles in the flame path that cause turbulent flame eddy currents), a subsonic flame front may accelerate to supersonic speed, transitioning from deflagration to detonation. The exact mechanism is not fully understood, and while existing theories are able to explain and model both deflagrations and detonations, there is no theory at present which can predict the transition phenomenon.

== Transition process ==
Under certain conditions, a subsonic flame front may accelerate due to turbulence and confinement effects, with flame speeds increasing from tens of meters per second to hundreds of meters per second. As the flames accelerates, it generates pressure waves that compress the unburned gases ahead of it, increasing the temperature and reactivity, which creates a feedback loop between flame speed, turbulence, and pressure waves. In the end, the pressure waves coalesce into a shockwave that couples with the reaction zone, resulting in a self-sustaining detonation wave that grows at supersonic speeds.

== Mechanism of transition ==
=== Flame acceleration ===
Flame acceleration is a crucial stage in DDT and is strongly influenced by turbulence and flow instabilities, it can include the interactions with walls, obstacles, and boundary layers that can increase the flame surface area and their burning rate. Within confined tube experiments, flame speeds can increase from the initial values of 10-20 meters per second to hundreds of meters per second before transition.

=== Shock formation and coupling ===
As the flame accelerates, it produces compressed waves that travel ahead of the flame front, if they merge, it can intensify and evolve into a strong shockwave with pressure exceeding normal ambient conditions. When the shockwave becomes sufficiently strong, it can couple with a chemical reaction zone. Which forms a self-sustaining detonation wave with the coupled shock and reaction fronts being capable of traveling at between 1,500-3,000 meters per second (4,900-9,800 ft/s) depending on the mixture properties.

=== Critical conditions for DDT ===
The occurrence of DDT depends on several factors. The composition of the fuel-air mixture, the degree of confinement, and the presence of obstacles, these all have contributing factors for DDT. As well, highly reactive mixtures, such as hydrogen-air can reach detonation more easily than hydrocarbon-air mixtures. Initial pressure and temperature conditions also play as significant role, elevated pressures significantly reduced to transition distance and time compared to the atmospheric conditions.

== Examples ==
A deflagration to detonation transition has been a feature of several major industrial accidents:

- 1970 propane vapor cloud explosion in Port Hudson
- Flixborough disaster
- Phillips disaster of 1989 in Pasadena, Texas
- Damage observed in the Buncefield fire
- 2020 Beirut explosions

== Applications ==
The phenomenon is exploited in pulse detonation engines (PDEs), as detonation produces a more efficient combustion of the reactants than deflagration, resulting in higher thermodynamic efficiency and greater thrust output. Such engines typically employ a Shchelkin spiral in the combustion chamber to enhanced turbulence and facilitate the deflagration to detonation transition.

The mechanism has also found military use in thermobaric weapons, where rapid combustion and pressure buildup can lead to enhance blast effects compared to conventional explosives.

== Industrial safety ==
DDT is a major concern in industrial settings that involve flammable gas, such as pipelines, chemical plants, and storage facilities. These areas are more prone to accidents since confined spaces can produce overpressures of over 100 kPa and in extreme cases several MPa. Understanding conditions that lead to transition are essential for risk assessment, explosion prevention, and safety regulation designs.

== Experimental observations ==
Experimental studies often investigate DDT in tubes or channels, ranging from centimeters to several meters in length, this is done to see where flame acceleration can be observed over distances before transition occurs. The presence of obstacles, such as baffles or Shchekin spirals, happens to highly enhance flame acceleration by increasing the turbulence, with spacing and geometry affecting whether transition occurs within milliseconds to seconds. High-speed imaging and diagnostics have revealed that detonation formation often occurs after the flame reaches its critical velocity of 100-300 m/s before a jump to supersonic speeds.

== Related phenomena ==
An analogous deflagration to detonation transition (DDT) has also been proposed for thermonuclear reactions responsible for Type la supernovae, in which a subsonic burning front that is in a white dwarf star may transition into a detonation under certain conditions. This process has been called a "carbon detonation", reflecting the rapid fusion of carbon rich material one statin nation conditions are reached.

In such models, turbulence and instabilities within the stellar material can accelerate the flame in a manner analogous to confined combustion systems, potentially leading to a rapid transition and a large scale energy release from the star.

== See also ==
- Zeldovich spontaneous wave
- Dust explosion
- Pressure piling
- Boiling liquid expanding vapor explosion (BLEVE)
