= Rotating detonation engine =

Type of rocket engine

Conceptual animation of RDE flow field by Oak Ridge National Laboratory.

A rotating detonation engine (RDE) uses a form of pressure gain combustion, where one or more detonations continuously travel around an annular channel. Computational simulations and experimental results have shown that the RDE has potential in transport and other applications.

In detonative combustion, the flame front expands at supersonic speed. It is theoretically up to 25% more efficient than conventional deflagrative combustion, potentially enabling increased fuel efficiency.

Disadvantages include instability and noise.

== Concept ==
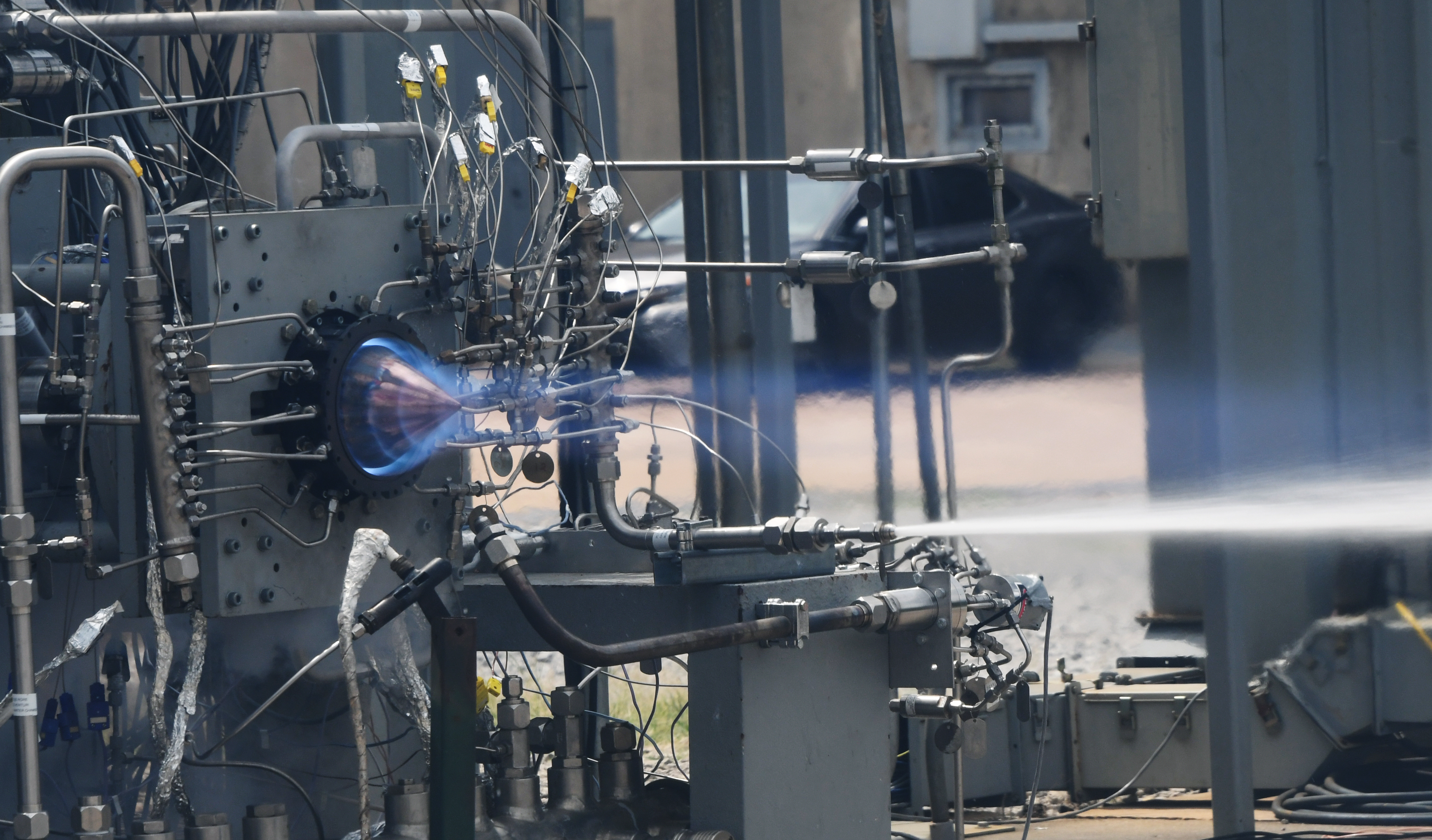
A prototype RDE under test at the Marshall Space Flight Center

The basic concept of an RDE is a detonation wave that travels around a circular channel (annulus). Fuel and oxidizer are injected into the channel, normally through small holes or slits. A detonation is initiated in the fuel/oxidizer mixture by some form of igniter. After the engine is started, the detonation is self-sustaining. One detonation ignites the fuel/oxidizer mixture, which releases the energy necessary to sustain the detonation. The combustion products expand out of the channel and are pushed out of the channel by the incoming fuel and oxidizer.

Although the RDE's design is similar to the pulse detonation engine (PDE), the RDE can function continuously because the waves cycle around the chamber, while the PDE requires the chambers to be purged after each pulse.

== Development ==
The concept of rotating detonations emerged from theoretical studies on detonation waves and rocket engine combustion instability. Experimental observation and analysis first occurred in 1950s in both the Soviet Union and United States, followed by a prolonged period of limited research during the 1960s–1990s. In the Soviet Union, B. V. Voitsekhovskii pioneered the development, while in the United States, J.A. Nicholls at the University of Michigan advanced the concept through his investigations of detonations and tangential combustion instabilities in liquid rocket engines.

=== GE Aerospace ===
In 2023 GE Aerospace demonstrated a subscale laboratory turbine-based combined-cycle (TBCC) system that combined a Mach 2.5-class turbofan with a rotating detonation-dual-mode ramjet (RD-DMRJ). The test came 18 months after program launch. The company reported rotating detonations of a compressed fuel-air mixture in the presence of the supersonic airflow necessary for speeds above Mach 5.

In 2026, the company and Lockheed Martin announced a joint effort to produce a hypersonic missile powered by an RDE. The RDE is to initially accelerate the missile to supersonic speeds, at which point it will reconfigure to act as a ramjet, then reconfiguring to a scramjet to reach hypersonic speeds.

=== DARPA ===
DARPA is working with RTX on Gambit, researching the application of rotating detonation engines for supersonic air-launched standoff missiles. DARPA is also working with Venus Aerospace which successfully tested its RDRE engine in March 2024.

=== US Navy ===
The US Navy has been pushing development. Researchers at the Naval Research Laboratory (NRL) have a particular interest in the capability of detonation engines such as the RDE to reduce the fuel consumption of their ships. Several obstacles must still be overcome in order to use the RDE in the field. As of 2012, NRL researchers were focusing on better understanding how the RDE works.

=== Aerojet Rocketdyne ===
Since 2010, Aerojet Rocketdyne has conducted over 520 tests of multiple configurations.

=== NASA ===
Daniel Paxson at the Glenn Research Center used simulations in computational fluid dynamics (CFD) to assess the RDE's detonation frame of reference and compare performance with the PDE. He found that an RDE can perform at least on the same level as a PDE. Furthermore, he found that RDE performance can be directly compared to the PDE as their performance was essentially the same.

On January 25, 2023, NASA reported successfully testing its first full-scale rotating detonation rocket engine (RDRE). This engine produced 18 kN (4,000 lbf) of thrust. NASA has stated their intention to create a 44 kN (10,000 lbf) thrust unit as the next research step. On December 20, 2023, a full-scale Rotating Detonation Rocket Engine combustor was reportedly fired for 251 seconds, achieving more than 26 kN (5,800 lbf) of thrust. Test stand video captured at NASA's Marshall Space Flight Center in Huntsville, Alabama, US, demonstrated ignition.

=== Energomash ===
According to Russian Vice Prime Minister Dmitry Rogozin, in mid-January 2018 NPO Energomash company completed the initial test phase of a 2-ton class liquid propellant RDE and plans to develop larger models for use in space launch vehicles.

=== Purdue University ===
In May 2016, a team of researchers affiliated with the US Air Force developed a rotating detonation rocket engine operating with liquid oxygen and natural gas as propellants. Additional RDE testing was conducted at Purdue University, including a test article called "Detonation Rig for Optical, Non-intrusive Experimental measurements (DRONE)", an "unwrapped" semi-bounded, linear detonation channel experiment. IN Space LLC, in a contract with the US Air Force, tested a 4,900 lbf (22 kN) thrust rotating detonation rocket engine (RDRE) while testing with liquid oxygen and gaseous methane at Purdue University in 2021.

=== D-propulse ===
India-based defence start-up D-Propulse announced the successful demonstration of a 5 kN-class rotating detonation engine (RDE) at a Defence Research and Development Organisation facility in Hyderabad.

=== University of Central Florida ===
In May 2020, a team of engineering researchers affiliated with the US Air Force claimed to have developed a highly experimental working model rotating detonation engine capable of producing 890 N (200 lbf) of thrust operating on a hydrogen/oxygen fuel mix.

In 2021 the group demonstrated an oblique detonation wave engine with a ramp angle of 30 degrees.

=== JAXA ===
On July 26, 2021 (UTC), Japan Aerospace Exploration Agency (JAXA) succeeded in testing the RDE in space for the first time in the world by launching the S-520-31 sounding rocket equipped with a 500 N (110 lbf) class RDE in the second stage. The engine used gaseous methane and oxygen as propellants, generating an average thrust of 518 N (116 lbf) and delivering 290 seconds of specific impulse. Rotating combustion also created a torque of 0.26 N·m, so a S-shaped pulse detonation engine was used to reduce the spin of the stage.

S-520-34 launched on November 14, 2024, experimented successfully with a liquid ethanol / N_{2}O propellant.

=== Łukasiewicz Research Network - Institute of Aviation ===
On September 15, 2021, the Warsaw Institute of Aviation performed the first successful flight test of an experimental rocket powered by a rotating detonation rocket engine, powered by liquid propellants. The test took place on September 15, 2021, at the testing ground of the Military Institute of Armament Technology in Zielonka near Warsaw in Poland. The rocket engine, according to the plan, worked for 3.2 s, accelerating the rocket to a speed of about 90 m/s, which allowed the rocket to reach an altitude of 450 m.

=== Beijing Power Machinery Institute ===
In 2023 researchers announced a demonstration unit of a hybrid air-breathing engine. It combines a continuous RDE for propulsion at below Mach 7 with an oblique detonation engine for use at speeds up to Mach 16. The oblique detonation waves are stationary and stabilized. BPMI is China's leading ramjet manufacturer.

=== Chongqing University Industrial Technology Research Institute/Sky Flight Science and Technology Center ===
On March 21, 2023, Chongqing University Industrial Technology Research Institute along with Sky Flight Science and Technology Center has reported they achieved the successful ignition test of China's first 1,000 N (220 lbf) kerosene-fueled continuous rotating detonation engine and conducted skid tests of the H1-M continuous rotating detonation engine in 2022.

=== Pratt & Whitney ===
On March 4, 2025, Pratt & Whitney reported they successfully completed tests on their RDE. It was tested in extreme conditions they are looking to operate in, with their eventual goal: to propel “Vehicles critical to future defence applications”. They believe the engine with no moving parts can increase efficiency and cost due to the lower complexity, allowing for more mass to be budgeted in other subsystems, like fuel and payloads.

=== Karlsruhe Institute of Technology (KIT) ===
On July 16, 2025, the Karlsruhe Institute of Technology's Institute for Thermal Energy Technology and Safety (ITES) successfully tested a rotating detonation combustor with turbine integration and electricity production, with a combustor runtime of 90 seconds and turbine runtime of 60 seconds.

=== PEGASUS (ARIS) ===
PEGASUS, a focus project within the Academic Space Initiative Switzerland (ARIS, by ETH Zurich), has designed the first student-built RDE. An engine with 1 kN of thrust for 10 seconds is currently in development.

=== Astrobotics ===
Astrobotic Technology demonstrated 18 kN (4,000 lbf) RDE in April 2026. It fired continually for 300 seconds at full thrust.

=== Other research ===
Other experiments have used numerical procedures to better understand the flow-field of the RDE. In 2020, a study from the University of Washington explored an experimental device that allowed control of parameters such as the width of the annulus. Using a high-speed camera, researchers were able to view it operating in extreme slow motion. Based on that they developed a mathematical model to describe the process.

In 2021, the Institute of Mechanics, Chinese Academy of Sciences, successfully tested the world's first hypersonic detonation wave engine powered by kerosene, which could propel a plane at Mach 9.

== See also ==
- Air-augmented rocket – Rockets that use supersonic exhaust to create additional acceleration
- Aerospike engine – Type of rocket engine
- Fickett–Jacobs cycle – Thermodynamic cycle
- Index of aviation articles
- Rocket turbine engine
- Pulsejet – Engine where combustion is pulsed instead of continuous
