= Pressure piling =

Pressure piling is a phenomenon related to combustion of gases in a tube or long vessel. When a flame front propagates along a tube, the unburned gases ahead of the front are compressed, and hence heated. The amount of compression varies depending on the geometry and can range from twice to eight times the initial pressure. Where multiple vessels are connected by piping, ignition of gases in one vessel and pressure piling may result in a deflagration to detonation transition and very large explosion pressure.

In electrical equipment in hazardous areas, if two electrical enclosures are connected by a conduit, an explosion of a gas in one of the compartments travels through the conduit into the next enclosure. The pressure of the 'primary' explosion together with the pressure from the 'secondary' explosion in the other compartment produces one huge explosion that the equipment cannot handle. Heat, arcs or sparks escape from the equipment and ignite any gas or vapour that may be around.

Operators avoid this by not using conduits to join classified equipment together and by using barrier glands on cables going into the enclosure. This ensures that compartments remain separate at all times.
