= Pulse detonation engine =

Rocket engine that uses detonation waves to combust fuel and oxidizer

A pulse detonation engine (PDE) is a type of propulsion system that uses detonation waves to combust a fuel and oxidizer mixture.

The engine is pulsed because the mixture must be renewed in the combustion chamber between each detonation wave and the next. Theoretically, a PDE can operate from subsonic up to a hypersonic flight speed of roughly Mach 5. An ideal PDE design can have a thermodynamic efficiency higher than other designs like turbojets and turbofans because a detonation wave rapidly compresses the mixture and adds heat at constant volume. Consequently, moving parts like compressor spools are not necessarily required in the engine, which could significantly reduce overall weight and cost. Key issues for further development include fast and efficient mixing of the fuel and oxidizer, the prevention of autoignition, and integration with an inlet and nozzle.

As of April 2026, no practical PDE has been put into production, but several testbed engines have been built and one was successfully integrated into a low-speed demonstration aircraft that flew in sustained PDE powered flight in 2008.

== History ==
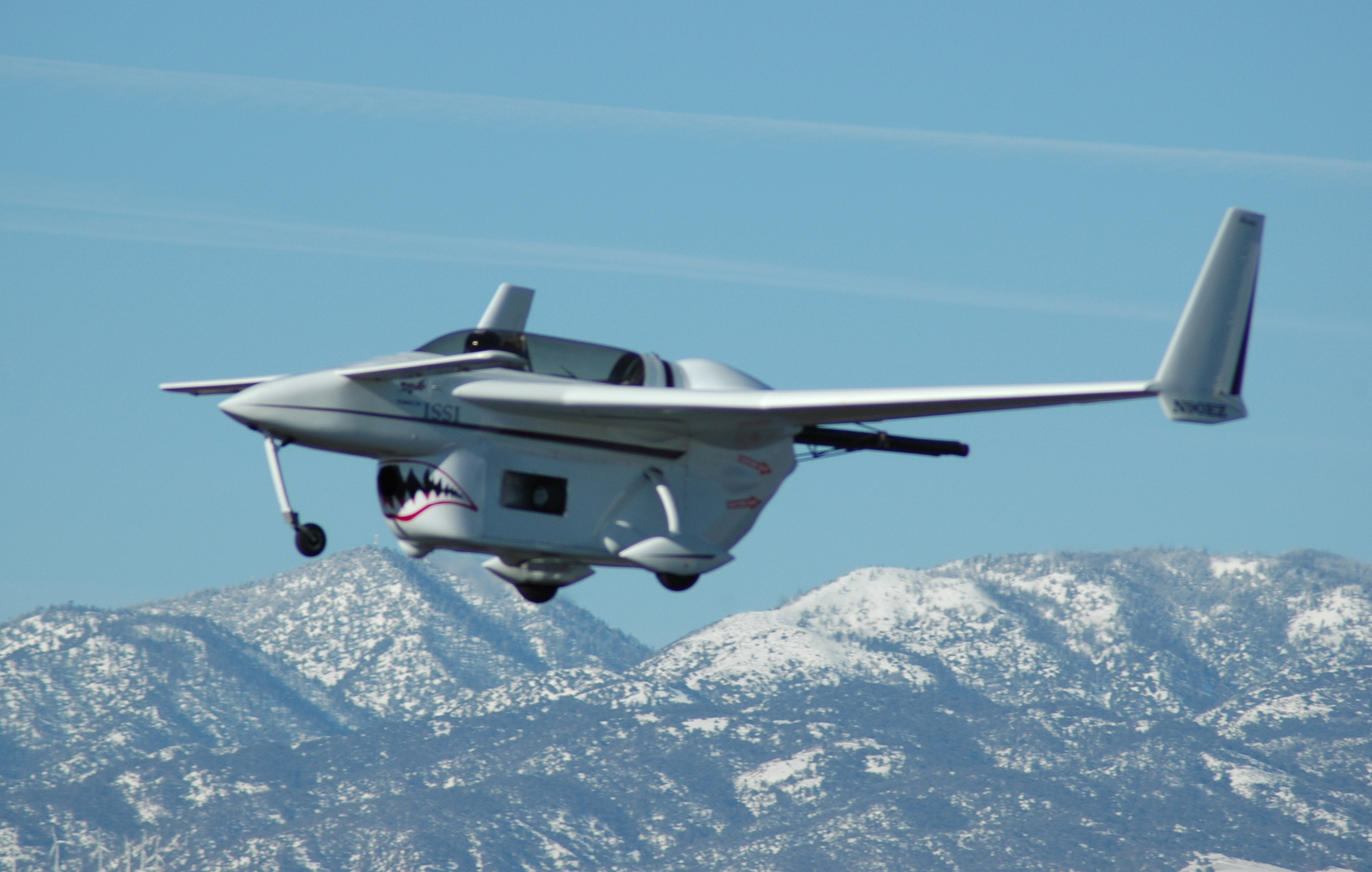
In-flight picture of the pulsed-detonation–powered, and heavily modified, Rutan Long-EZ on January 31, 2008

PDEs have been considered for propulsion since 1940.

The first known flight of an aircraft powered by a pulse detonation engine took place at the Mojave Air & Space Port on 31 January 2008. The project was developed by the Air Force Research Laboratory and Innovative Scientific Solutions, Inc. The aircraft selected for the flight was a heavily modified Scaled Composites Long-EZ, named Borealis. The engine consisted of four tubes producing pulse detonations at a frequency of 80 Hz, creating up to 200 pounds of thrust (890 newtons). Many fuels were considered and tested by the engine developers, but a refined octane was used for this flight. A small rocket system was used to facilitate the liftoff of the Long-EZ, but the PDE operated under its own power for 10 seconds at an altitude of approximately 100 feet (30 m). The flight took place at a low speed whereas the appeal of the PDE engine concept lies more at high speeds, but the demonstration showed that a PDE can be integrated into an aircraft frame without experiencing structural problems from the 195-200 dB detonation waves. No more flights are planned for the modified Long-EZ, but the success is likely to fuel more funding for PDE research. The aircraft itself has been moved to the National Museum of the United States Air Force for display.

In June 2008, the Defense Advanced Research Projects Agency (DARPA) unveiled Blackswift, which was intended to use this technology to reach speeds of up to Mach 6. However the project was reported cancelled soon afterward, in October 2008.

== Operation ==
The basic operation of the PDE is similar to that of the pulse jet engine. In the pulse jet, air is mixed with fuel to create a flammable mixture that is then ignited in an open chamber. The resulting combustion greatly increases the pressure of the mixture to approximately 100 atmospheres (10 MPa), which then expands through a nozzle for thrust.

To ensure that the mixture exits to the rear, thereby pushing the aircraft forward, a series of shutters are used to close off the front of the engine. Careful tuning of the inlet ensures the shutters close at the right time to force the air to travel in one direction only through the engine. Some pulse jet designs use a tuned resonant cavity to provide the valving action through the airflow in the system. These designs normally look like a U-shaped tube, open at both ends.

In either system, the pulse jet has problems during the combustion process. As the fuel burns and expands to create thrust, it is also pushing any remaining unburnt charge rearward, out of the nozzle. In many cases some of the charge is ejected before burning, which causes the famous trail of flame seen on the V-1 flying bomb and other pulse jets. Even while inside the engine, the mixture's volume is constantly changing which inefficiently converts fuel into usable energy.

All regular jet engines and most rocket engines operate on the deflagration of fuel, that is, the rapid but subsonic combustion of fuel. The pulse detonation engine is a concept currently in active development to create a jet engine that operates on the supersonic detonation of fuel. Because the combustion takes place so rapidly, the charge (fuel/air mix) does not have time to expand during this process, so it takes place under almost constant volume. Constant volume combustion is more efficient than open-cycle designs like gas turbines, which leads to greater fuel efficiency.

As the combustion process is so rapid, mechanical shutters are difficult to arrange with the required performance. Instead, PDEs generally use a series of valves to time the process carefully.

Most PDE research is military in nature, as the engine could be used to develop a new generation of high-speed, long-range reconnaissance aircraft that would fly high enough to be out of range of any current anti-aircraft defenses, while offering range considerably greater than the SR-71, which required a massive tanker support fleet.

Key difficulties in pulse detonation engines are achieving DDT without requiring a tube long enough to make it impractical and drag-imposing on the aircraft (adding a U-bend into the tube extinguishes the detonation wave); reducing the noise (often described as sounding like a jackhammer); and damping the severe vibration caused by the operation of the engine.

== Uses ==
If both fuel and oxidizer are carried by the vehicle a pulse detonation engine is independent of the atmosphere and it can be used in spaceflight. On 26 July 2021 (UTC), Japan's space agency JAXA successfully tested a pulse detonation rocket engine in space on a S-520 sounding rocket flight. The upper stage of the rocket used a rotating detonation engine (RDE) as the main engine and a S-shaped pulse detonation engine was used to de-spin the stage after the main engine burn. PDE operated three times in the flight for a total of 14 cycles.

== See also ==
- Nuclear pulse propulsion
- Rotating detonation engine
- Scramjet
- Gluhareff Pressure Jet
- Aurora aircraft
