= Deflagration =

Combustion that leads on to an explosion

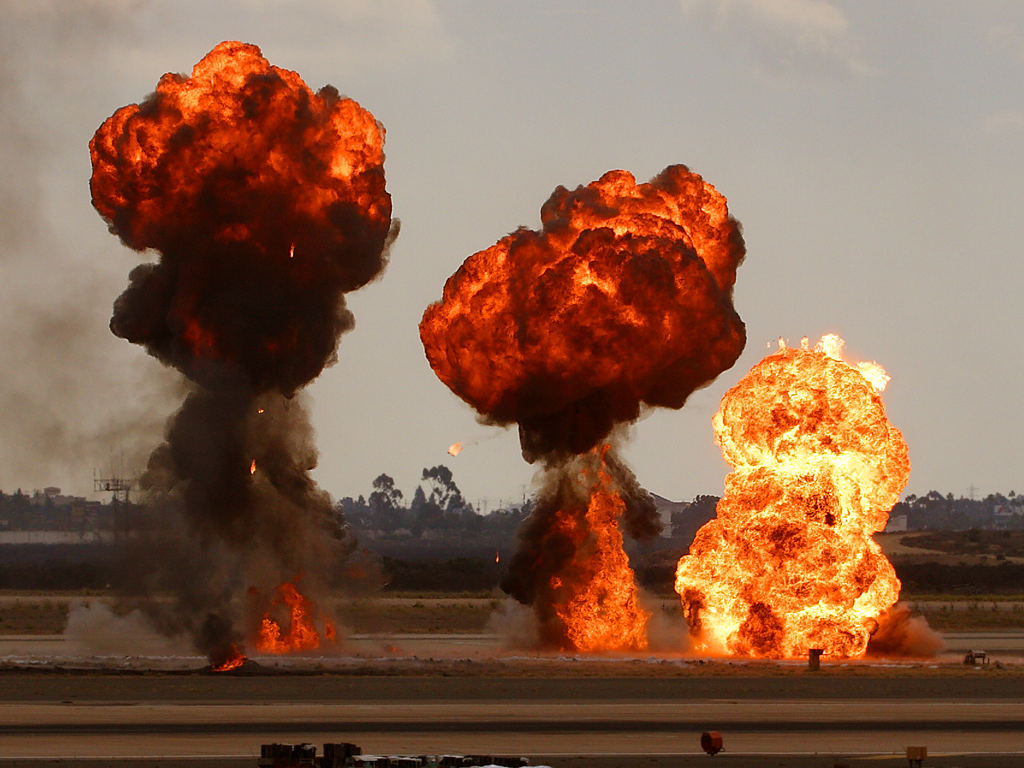
Pyrotechnic deflagrations

Deflagration (Lat: de + flagrare, 'to burn down') is subsonic combustion in which a pre-mixed flame propagates through an explosive or a mixture of fuel and oxidizer. Deflagrations in high and low explosives or fuel–oxidizer mixtures may transition to a detonation depending upon confinement and other factors. Most fires found in daily life are diffusion flames. Deflagrations with flame speeds in the range of 1 m/s differ from detonations which propagate supersonically with detonation velocities in the range of km/s.

== Applications ==
Deflagrations are often used in engineering applications when the force of the expanding gas is used to move an object such as a projectile down a barrel, or a piston in an internal combustion engine. Deflagration systems and products can also be used in mining, demolition and stone quarrying via gas pressure blasting as a beneficial alternative to high explosives.

== Terminology of explosive safety ==
When studying or discussing explosive safety, or the safety of systems containing explosives, the terms deflagration, detonation and deflagration-to-detonation transition (commonly referred to as DDT) must be understood and used appropriately to convey relevant information. As explained above, a deflagration is a subsonic reaction, whereas a detonation is a supersonic (greater than the sound speed of the material) reaction. Distinguishing between a deflagration or a detonation can be difficult to impossible to the casual observer. Rather, confidently differentiating between the two requires instrumentation and diagnostics to ascertain reaction speed in the affected material. Therefore, when an unexpected event or an accident occurs with an explosive material or an explosive-containing system, it is usually impossible to know whether the explosive deflagrated or detonated as both can appear as very violent, energetic reactions. Therefore, the energetic materials community coined the term "high explosive violent reaction" or "HEVR" to describe a violent reaction that, because it lacked diagnostics to measure sound-speed, could have been either a deflagration or a detonation.

== Flame physics ==
The underlying flame physics can be understood with the help of an idealized model consisting of a uniform one-dimensional tube of unburnt and burned gaseous fuel, separated by a thin transitional region of width $\delta\;$ in which the burning occurs. The burning region is commonly referred to as the flame or flame front. In equilibrium, thermal diffusion across the flame front is balanced by the heat supplied by burning.

Two characteristic timescales are important here. The first is the thermal diffusion timescale $\tau_d\;$, which is approximately equal to

$$\tau_d \simeq \delta^2 / \kappa,$$

where $\kappa \;$ is the thermal diffusivity. The second is the burning timescale $\tau_b$ that strongly decreases with temperature, typically as

$$\tau_b\propto \exp[\Delta U/(k_B T_f)],$$

where $\Delta U\;$ is the activation barrier for the burning reaction and $T_f\;$ is the temperature developed as the result of burning; the value of this so-called "flame temperature" can be determined from the laws of thermodynamics.

For a stationary moving ^{(unclear)} deflagration front, these two timescales must be equal: the heat generated by burning is equal to the heat carried away by heat transfer. This makes it possible to calculate the characteristic width $\delta\;$ of the flame front:

$$\tau_b = \tau_d\;,$$

thus

$$\delta \simeq \sqrt {\kappa \tau_b} .$$

Now, the thermal flame front propagates at a characteristic speed $S_l\;$, which is simply equal to the flame width divided by the burn time:

$$S_l \simeq \delta / \tau_b \simeq \sqrt {\kappa  / \tau_b} .$$

This simplified model neglects the change of temperature and thus the burning rate across the deflagration front. This model also neglects the possible influence of turbulence. As a result, this derivation gives only the laminar flame speed—hence the designation $S_l\;$.

== Damaging events ==
Damage to buildings, equipment and people can result from a large-scale, short-duration deflagration. The potential damage is primarily a function of the total amount of fuel burned in the event (total energy available), the maximum reaction velocity that is achieved, and the manner in which the expansion of the combustion gases is contained. Vented deflagrations tend to be less violent or damaging than contained deflagrations.

In free-air deflagrations, there is a continuous variation in deflagration effects relative to the maximum flame velocity. When flame velocities are low, the effect of a deflagration is to release heat, such as in a flash fire. At flame velocities near the speed of sound, the energy released is in the form of pressure, and the resulting high pressure can damage equipment and buildings.

== See also ==
- Conflagration
- Deflagration to detonation transition
- Pressure piling
