= Science Realm =

Science Realm is a United States Government project with the aim of creating a vertical-takeoff horizontal-landing (VTOHL) single-stage-to-orbit (SSTO) craft, the term is also associated with the software this project uses to simulate takeoff and landing.

== Science Dawn ==
Science Realm's predecessor Science Dawn was a classified program to build a rocket-launched supersonic horizontal-take off horizontal-landing (HOTOL) SSTO spaceplane. However, it became clear that horizontal takeoff requirement was an inappropriate application of rocket thrust-to-weight ratio; the angle and relative size of rocket and earth meant the path of least effort was almost completely vertical (completely against gravitation). Consequently, SCIENCE DAWN ended, and the focus transferred to SCIENCE REALM.

== Spaceplane ==
The Space Maneuver Vehicle (SMV) completed a successful autonomous approach and landing on its first flight test on 11 August 1998. The unmanned vehicle was dropped from a US Army UH-60 Black Hawk helicopter at an altitude of 9,000 feet, performed a controlled approach and landed on the runway. The total flight time was 90 seconds. During the initial portion of its free fall, the maneuver vehicle was stabilized by a parachute. After it is released from the parachute, the vehicle accelerated and perform a controlled glide. This glide simulated the final approach and landing phases of such a vehicle returning from orbit.

== Performance requirements ==
The project is split into four Maximum Performance Missions Sets, which attempt to define the maximum conditions for four general uses of the spaceplane. Due to the high secrecy of the project, instead of giving a threshold and objective for each mission requirement, missions sets are defined.

=== Mark I ===
Demonstrator or ACTD non-orbital vehicle that can only pop up

- Pop-up profile: Approximately Mach 16 at 300 kft at payload separation
- Pop up and deliver 1 to 3 klbs of mission assets (does not include boost stage, aeroshell, guidance or propellant) to any terrestrial destination
- Pop up and deliver 3 to 5 klbs of orbital assets (does not include upperstage) due east to a 100 x 100 NM orbit
- Payload bay size 10' x 5' x 5', weight capacity 10 klbs

=== Mark II ===
Mark 2 defines an orbit capable vehicle with these requirements

- Pop up and deliver 7 to 9 klbs of mission assets (does not include boost stage, aeroshell, guidance or propellant) to any terrestrial destination
- Pop up and deliver 15 klbs of orbital assets (does not include upperstage) due east to a 100 x 100 NM orbit
- Launch due east, carrying 4-klb payload, orbit at 100 x 100 NM
- Payload bay size 25' x 12' x 12', weight capacity 20 klbs

=== Mark III ===
- Pop up and deliver 14 to 18 klbs of mission assets (does not include boost stage, aeroshell, guidance or propellant) to any terrestrial destination
- Pop up and deliver 25 klbs of orbital assets (does not include upperstage) due east to a 100 x 100 NM orbit
- Launch due east, carrying a 6-klb payload, orbit at 100 x 100 NM and return to base
- Launch polar, carrying 1-klb payload and return to base
- Payload bay size 25' x 12' x 12', weight capacity 40 klbs

=== Mark IV ===
- Pop up and deliver 20 to 30 klbs of mission assets (does not include boost stage, aeroshell, guidance or propellant) to any terrestrial destination
- Pop up and deliver 45 klbs of orbital assets (does not include upperstage) due east to a 100 x 100 NM orbit
- Launch due east, carrying a 20-klb payload, orbit at 100 x 100 NM and return to base
- Launch polar, carrying 5-klb payload and return to base
- Payload bay size 45' x 15' x 15', weight capacity 60 klbs

== See also ==
=== Spacecraft and spaceplane propulsion ===
- Aerospike engine
- Space transport
- Scramjet

==== Not SSTO ====
- Two-stage-to-orbit
- Three-stage-to-orbit

=== Other spaceplane and spacecraft vehicles ===
- Avatar RLV
- NASA Space Shuttle decision
- HOTOL
- Reaction Engines Skylon
- VentureStar
- X-30
- X-33
