= Alan Bond (engineer) =

British rocket scientist

- Born: June 1944 (age 82); Ripley, England
- Occupation: Mechanical Engineer
- Employer: Reaction Engines Limited
- Known for: Major developer of Project Daedalus starship concept, HOTOL and Skylon spaceplanes. Founder of Reaction Engines Limited.
- Notable work: A Sumerian Observation of the Köfels' Impact Event

Alan Bond (born June 1944) is a British mechanical and aerospace engineer, who served as managing director of Reaction Engines Ltd and associated with Project Daedalus, Blue Streak missile, HOTOL, Reaction Engines Skylon and the Reaction Engines A2 hypersonic passenger aircraft.

== Career ==
Alan Bond is an engineer, with a degree in Mechanical Engineering. He worked on liquid rocket engines, principally the RZ.2 (liquid oxygen / kerosene) and the RZ.20 (liquid oxygen / liquid hydrogen) at Rolls-Royce under the tutelage of Val Cleaver, and he was also involved with flight trials of the Blue Streak at Woomera.

He then worked for around 20 years at UK Atomic Energy Authority's Culham Laboratory on nuclear fusion, on the JET and RFX nuclear research projects. He was engaged in studies for the application of fusion to interplanetary space travel. He is the leading author of the report on the Project Daedalus interstellar, fusion powered starship concept, published by the British Interplanetary Society.

In the 1980s, he was one of the creators of the HOTOL space plane project, along with Dr. Bob Parkinson of British Aerospace. Alan Bond brought a precooled jet engine design he had invented to the HOTOL project, and this became the Rolls-Royce RB545 rocket engine.

In 1989, he formed Reaction Engines Limited (REL) with fellow rocket engineers, Richard Varvill and John Scott-Scott. REL is developing a single-stage orbital space plane Skylon, and other advanced vehicles including the Reaction Engines LAPCAT A2 hypersonic airliner concept as part of the European LAPCAT programme. The projects have involved the practical development of hydrogen fuelled, pre-cooled air breathing rocket engines, most notably, an engine called SABRE (Synergetic Air Breathing Rocket Engine) as well as the Scimitar and STERN engines.

Bond retired from Reaction Engines in late 2017.

== Köfels impact event ==
In a self-published book co-authored with Mark Hempsell, Bond claimed to have deciphered an Assyrian clay tablet dated to around 700 BC that they argued might describe an asteroid strike causing a landslide at Köfels in Tyrol in 3123 BC. They relate this to the destruction of Sodom and Gomorrah. The landslide is normally dated to around 7800 BC, long before the tablet was recorded and over 4,500 years before the Bristol researchers' date. Bond and Hempsell have suggested that there was contamination, a claim that has been denied by other research. The impact theory had already been proposed in 1936 by the Austrian scientist Franz Suess and later on by Alexander Tollmann, who hypothesized impacts around 7640 BC and 3150 BC, respectively. The question of whether an impact caused the landslide has been researched by others and no evidence was found for an asteroid, meteorite or comet, and geologists consider it to have been caused by other factors such as 'deep creep'.

== Television documentary ==
The work of Bond and his colleagues Richard Varvill and John Scott-Scott on the development of the HOTOL and SKYLON space planes was chronicled in a 50-minute TV documentary, The Three Rocketeers, first broadcast on BBC Four on 12 September 2012.

== Publications ==
- Project Daedalus Study Group: A. Bond et al., Project Daedalus – The Final Report on the BIS Starship Study, Journal of the British Interplanetary Society (JBIS) Interstellar Studies, Supplement 1978
- J.R. Last, A. Bond, E. Salpietro: Mechanical tests on insulation systems for the JET poloidal coils in: Proceedings of the Tenth Symposium on Fusion Technology, Padua, Italy, 4–9 September 1978.
- A. Bond, A.R. Martin: A conservative estimate of the number of habitable planets in the Galaxy in: British Interplanetary Society, Conference on Interstellar Travel and Communication, London, England, 4, 5 April 1977. Journal of the British Interplanetary Society, vol. 31, November 1978.
- A. Bond: On the improbability of intelligent extraterrestrials; Journal of the British Interplanetary Society (Interstellar Studies), vol. 35, May 1982, pp. 195–207.
- A.R. Martin, A. Bond: Is mankind unique? in: British Interplanetary Society, Meeting on Space, Brighton, England, 12–14 November 1982; Journal of the British Interplanetary Society (Interstellar Studies) (ISSN 0007-084X), vol. 36, May 1983, pp. 223–225.
- A. Bond: A fully reusable launch vehicle for Europe? in: Proceedings of the Conference on Space – Technology and opportunity; Geneva, Switzerland, 28–30 May 1985 (A86-44526 21–12). Pinner, England, Online Publications, 1985, pp. 221–229.
- Alan Bond, Anthony R. Martin, Robert A. Bond: Concept studies for a laser powered Orbital Transfer Vehicle, in: 38th IAF, International Astronautical Congress, Brighton, England, 10–17 October 1987.
- A. Bond, R. Varvill, J. Scott-Scott, T. Martin: SKYLON – a realistic single stage spaceplane, Spaceflight vol. 45, 158 (2003)
- R. Varvill, A. Bond: A Comparison of Propulsion Concepts for SSTO Reusable Launchers, JBIS vol. 56, pp108–117 (2003)
- R. Varvill, A. Bond: The SKYLON Spaceplane, JBIS vol. 57, 22 (2004)
- H. Webber, A. Bond, M. Hempsell: The sensitivity of precooled air-breathing engine performance to heat exchanger design parameters, Journal of the British Interplanetary Society, vol. 60, 2007, pp. 188–196.
- A. Bond, M. Hempsell: A Sumerian Observation of the Köfels' Impact Event, Writersprintshop, 2008, ISBN 1-904623-64-6
- H. Webber, S. Feast, A. Bond: Heat Exchanger Design in Combined Cycle Engines, Journal of the British Interplanetary Society, vol. 62, No. 4, April 2009, pp. 122–130.
- M. Hempsell, A. Bond "Technical and Operations Design of the SKYLON Upper Stage", Journal of the British Interplanetary Society, vol. 63, 136–144 (2010)
- S. Feast, A. Bond "A Design for an Orbital Assembly Facility for Complex Missions", Journal of the British Interplanetary Society, vol. 63, 151–156 (2010)
- F. Jivraj, R. Varvill, A. Bond, G. Paniagua "The Scimitar Precooled Mach 5 Engine", Proceedings of the 2nd European Conference for Aero-Space Sciences, Volume: Paper 5-08-03 (2007)

== See also ==
- Tollmann's hypothetical bolide
