= Reaction Engines =

British aerospace company based in Oxfordshire, England

Coordinates: 51.657228°N 1.230461°W

Reaction Engines Limited
- Type: Private
- Industry: Aerospace, Engineering
- Founded: 1989
- Founders: Alan Bond; John Scott-Scott; Richard Varvill
- Fate: Entered administration, 2024
- Headquarters: Culham Science Centre, Oxfordshire, England
- Key people: Richard Varvill (Chief Designer); Mark Thomas (CEO); Adam Dissel (President of Reaction Engines Inc.)
- Products: Research & consultancy on propulsion systems for reusable space access and hypersonic flight; Lightweight heat exchangers; Precision engineering services

Reaction Engines Limited (REL) was a British aerospace manufacturer founded in 1989 and based in Oxfordshire, England. The company also operated in the USA, where it used the name Reaction Engines Inc. (REI).

REL entered administration on 31 October 2024. Both REL and REI ceased operations and laid off the bulk of their staff.

== History and personnel ==
In 1989, Reaction Engines was founded by Alan Bond (lead engineer on the British Interplanetary Society's Project Daedalus), Richard Varvill and John Scott-Scott (the two principal Rolls-Royce engineers from the RB545 engine project). The company conducted research into space propulsion systems, centred on the development of the Skylon re-usable SSTO spaceplane. The three founders had worked together on the HOTOL project, funding for which had been withdrawn the previous year, in 1988.

In 2015, BAE Systems agreed to buy a 20% stake in the company for £20.6m as part of an agreement to help develop Reaction Engines' Synergetic Air-Breathing Rocket Engine (SABRE), a hypersonic engine designed to propel the Skylon orbiter.

In April 2018, Boeing announced an investment in Reaction Engines, through Boeing HorizonX Ventures, with a $37.3 million Series B funding alongside Rolls-Royce. Rolls-Royce and REL announced a strategic partnership in August 2020, with a £20m investment.

In January 2023, the company announced that it had raised a further £40m from backers including the United Arab Emirates Strategic Development Fund.

At the end of October 2024, after unsuccessful attempts to raise more money from investors, the company ceased operations, laying off the majority of staff and entering administration.

== Research ==
=== Skylon ===
The proposed Skylon spacecraft

Skylon was a design for a single-stage-to-orbit combined-cycle-powered orbital spaceplane.

=== SABRE ===
Skylon, and the SABRE engine by which it was to be powered, were being developed as a private venture which aimed to overcome the obstacles that were imposed on further HOTOL development due to the British government classifying the HOTOL engine as an official secret, and keeping the engine design classified for many years afterward.

The company's development effort was focused on developing a ground demonstration of the SABRE air-breathing core, with additional funding gained from the sale of consultancy and spin-off applications from its heat exchanger expertise.

In February 2009, the European Space Agency announced that it was partially funding work on Skylon's engine to produce technology demonstrations by 2011. With this funding, Reaction Engines completed a non-frosting sub-zero heat exchanger demonstration program, Bristol University developed the STRICT expansion/deflection nozzle, and DLR completed an oxidiser-cooled combustion chamber demonstration. Reaction claimed this work moved the Skylon project to a TRL of 4/5.

In July 2016, at the Farnborough Air Show, Reaction Engines announced £60 million in funds from the UK Space Agency and ESA to create a ground-based SABRE demonstration engine by 2020.

Commenting on work undertaken at TF2 in Colorado, in April 2019, Reaction Engines announced that it had successfully tested the precooler technology for supersonic conditions needed to prevent the engine from melting, and in October 2019, Reaction announced that it successfully validated its precooler for hypersonic (Mach 5) conditions.

== United States ==
In January 2014, Reaction entered into a Cooperative research and development agreement (CRADA) with the United States Air Force Research Laboratory (AFRL) to assess and develop SABRE technology.

In 2015 AFRL announced their analysis "confirmed the feasibility and potential performance of the SABRE engine cycle". However they felt SSTO as a first application was a very high risk development path and proposed that a Two Stage to Orbit (TSTO) vehicle was a more realistic first step.

In 2016 AFRL released two TSTO concepts using SABRE in the first stage: The first 150 feet (46 m) long carrying an expendable upper stage in an underside opening cargo bay capable of delivering around 5,000 pounds (2,300 kg; 2.3 t) to an orbit of 100 nautical miles (190 km), the second 190 feet (58 m) long carrying a reusable spaceplane on its back, capable of delivering around 20,000 pounds (9,100 kg; 9.1 t) to an orbit of 100 nautical miles (190 km).

In March 2017, Reaction announced the formation of an American subsidiary, Reaction Engines Inc (REI), led by Adam Dissel in Castle Rock, Colorado.

In September 2017, REI announced a contract from DARPA to test a Reaction precooler test article "HTX" at temperatures exceeding 1,000 °C (1,830 °F; 1,270 K), previous precooler tests focusing on frost control having been conducted from ambient temperature.

== Other studies ==
=== LAPCAT A2 ===
On 5 February 2008, the company announced it had designed a passenger plane to the concept stage. The LAPCAT A2 would be capable of flying, non-stop, halfway around the world at hypersonic speed (Mach 5+).

The engine, SCIMITAR, has precooler technology which is somewhat similar to SABRE, but does not have the rocket features, and was optimized for higher efficiency for atmospheric flight.

=== Passenger Module for Skylon ===
Although Skylon was designed to only launch and retrieve satellites, and would be uncrewed, Reaction Engines Ltd. proposed a passenger module in the payload bay of the Reaction Engines Skylon spaceplane.

The passenger module was sized to fit in the payload bay, and early designs could carry up to 24 passengers and 1 crew. There was an ISS-type docking port and airlock as the central feature. There were two ground entry doors that align with the doors on the side of the Skylon payload bay to allow easy ground access to the cabin. The doors were fitted with conventional inflatable chutes for passengers to escape in case of any ground emergency. There could have been Space Shuttle-type windows on the roof of the module for passengers to enjoy the view in space. There was also a washroom and hygienic facilities provided in the cabin.

Further studies refined the concept, with an initial configuration to be fitted with five ejector seats, for four passengers and one crew, similar to the first four Space Shuttle spaceflights. Once the passenger module was fully certified, the ejection seats would be removed and there would be 16 upright seats installed for a short stay in space (<14 days) and four supine seats for a long stay in space (>14 days). An upright seat would also be provided for the crew. There were also life support systems under the cabin floor, equipment bays, and cargo holds.

=== Orbital Base Station ===
The Orbital Base Station (OBS) was a concept of a future, expandable space station to serve as an integral part of a future space transportation system and also in the maintenance and construction of future crewed Moon and Mars spacecraft.

The construction of the OBS was modular, and assumed the use of the Reaction Engines Skylon in Low Earth Orbit. The structure was based on a cylinder, designed to allow space inside the cylindrical section for the construction and repair of various spacecraft. The cylindrical structure would also provide space for habitation modules with docking ports, manipulator arms, and propellant farms to refuel an interplanetary spacecraft.

=== Reaction Engines Project Troy ===
The Reaction Engines Troy Mission was a concept of a future crewed mission to Mars. The concept arose to confirm the capability of the Skylon launch vehicle that it could enable large human exploration to the Solar System's planets.

The Troy spacecraft concept consisted of a robotic precursor mission, including an Earth Departure Stage, and a Mars Transfer Stage. There was a habitation module, a storage module, and a propulsion module to be deployed from the spacecraft to land together at a selected site on the Martian surface to form a base. There were also ferry vehicles that would transfer crew members to and from the base to an orbiting crewed spacecraft. There would have been three precursor spacecraft to Mars to set up three bases on the planet to enable maximum exploration of the planet's surface.

50 days after launch, the Earth Departure Stage was to be brought back to low Earth orbit by the Earth's gravity, and the Fluyt space tug would bring the stage back to the Orbital Base Station for construction of the later crewed mission.

The crewed spacecraft would consist of 3 habitation modules, 3 docking ports, and two ferry vehicles. The spacecraft would rotate along the centerline to provide artificial gravity. It would leave Earth with the Earth Departure Stage and transfer to Mars with the Mars Transfer Stage, and rendezvous with the precursor spacecraft in Martian orbit. The craft would dock together to enable the crew to transfer to the ferry vehicles for descent to the surface at a selected site. The crew, along with the equipped rovers, would spend 14 months to explore the Martian surface. The crew would return to Martian orbit with the ferry vehicle and rendezvous and dock with the orbiting crewed spacecraft. After a detailed inspection of the vehicle, the spacecraft would leave Mars for Earth on the Earth Return Stage. When the craft was captured in a Molniya orbit around Earth, the crew would board a ferry vehicle for transfer to low Earth orbit and rendezvous and dock with the waiting Skylon spacecraft for return to Earth.

Construction of the spacecraft would take place at the Orbital Base Station inside the cylindrical structure. Because the spacecraft was of highly modular design, the components would be brought up by the Skylon spacecraft. The rocket engines, fuel and oxidizer tanks, and habitation modules were sized to fit inside the Skylon payload bay, and that the fully assembled craft would also fit inside the cylindrical structure of the OBS.

=== Fluyt OTV ===
The Fluyt Orbital Transfer Vehicle (OTV) was a concept of a future space tug. It would have had the ability to dock with orbiting spacecraft and move payload in orbit. It was conceived to be assembled from two parts, each sized to fit inside the Skylon payload bay, it would be launched from the Skylon and would also be an integral part for the construction of the Orbital Base Station as well as the Reaction Engines Troy and the retrieval of the Earth Departure Stage from the Precursor mission of the Troy mission.

== Publications ==
- Varvill, Richard; Bond, Alan (May 1993). "Skylon: A Key Element of a Future Space Transportation System". Spaceflight. Vol. 35, no. 5. London: British Interplanetary Society. pp. 162–166. ISSN 0038-6340.
- Bond, Alan; Varvill, Richard (April 2003). "SKYLON- a realistic single stage spaceplane". Spaceflight. Vol. 45, no. 4. London: British Interplanetary Society. pp. 158–161. ISSN 0038-6340.
- Varvill, Richard; Bond, Alan (2003). "A Comparison of Propulsions Concepts for SSTO Reusable launchers" (PDF). Journal of the British Interplanetary Society. 56: 108–17. Bibcode:2003JBIS...56..108V. Archived from the original (PDF) on 28 June 2012.
- Varvill, Richard; Bond, Alan (2004). "The SKYLON Spaceplane" (PDF). Journal of the British Interplanetary Society. 57: 22–32. Bibcode:2004JBIS...57...22V. Archived from the original (PDF) on 16 May 2011.
- Jivraj, Farouk; Varvill, Richard; Bond, Alan; Paniagua, Guillermo (2007). The Scimitar Precooled Mach 5 Engine (PDF). 2nd European Conference for Aerospace Sciences (EUCASS). Archived from the original (PDF) on 4 March 2021.
- House of Commons Science and Technology Committee (2007). "2007: A Space Policy – Seventh Report of Session 2006–08". Vol. II. Her Majesty's Stationery Office. ISBN 978-0-215-03509-7.
- Tony Martin, ed. (11 September 2008). Solar Power Satellites and Spaceplanes – The Skylon Initiative (Technical report). Reaction Engines Ltd.
- Varvill, Richard (2008). Heat Exchanger Development at Reaction Engines Ltd (IAC-08-C4.5.2) (PDF). 57th International Astronautical Congress. Archived from the original (PDF) on 25 July 2011.
- Varvill, Richard; Paniagua, Guillermo; Kato, Hiromasa; Thatcher, Mark (2008). Design and Testing of the Contra-rotating Turbine for the Scimitar Pre-cooled Mach 5 Cruise Engine (IAC-08-C4.5.3) (PDF). 57th International Astronautical Congress. Archived from the original (PDF) on 20 October 2011.
- Varvill, Richard; Bond, Alan (2008). "The SKYLON Spaceplane – Progress to Realisation" (PDF). Journal of the British Interplanetary Society. 61: 412–418. Bibcode:2008JBIS...61..412V. Archived from the original (PDF) on 12 February 2012.
- Hempsell, Mark; Longstaff, Roger (2009). "Skylon User Manual v1.1" (PDF). Reaction Engines Ltd. Archived from the original (PDF) on 18 April 2016.
- Hempsell, Mark; Longstaff, Roger (October 2011). The Requirement Generation Process for the SKYLON Launch System (IAC-09.D2.5.7). 60th International Astronautical Congress. Daejeon.
- Hempsell, Mark; Bond, Alan; Bond, R; Varvill, Richard (October 2011). Progress on the SKYLON and SABRE Development Programme (IAC-11.D 2.4.2, IAC-11.B3.2.6). 62nd International Astronautical Congress. Cape Town.
- Bond, Alan (8 December 2011). Progress on the SKYLON Reusable Spaceplane (PDF). 7th Appleton Space Conference (RALSpace).
- Hempsell, Mark (September 2013). Progress on SKYLON and SABRE (IAC-13.D2.4.6). 64th International Astronautical Congress. Beijing, China.
- Hempsell, Mark; Longstaff, Roger (2014). "Skylon User Manual v2.1" (PDF). Reaction Engines. pp. 1–52. Archived from the original (PDF) on 29 November 2015.
- Davis, Philippa; Hempsell, Mark; Varvill, Richard (2015). Progress on Skylon and SABRE (IAC-15-D2.1.8). 66th International Astronautical Congress.
