= Richard Varvill =

British engineer (born 1961)

Richard Antony Varvill (born 23 September 1961) is a British engineer, famous as the former Chief Designer (Technical Director) at Reaction Engines Limited.

== Early life ==
He was born in Hammersmith in west London. He is the son of Mark Varvill, a naval architect, and Elizabeth Agar, and has a younger sister. His great-great-great-great grandfather on his mother's side is Hucks Gibbs, 1st Baron Aldenham.

He was educated at Belmont Preparatory School at Holmbury St Mary in the Surrey Hills AONB, then Bryanston School in Dorset. He read Mechanical Engineering at the University of Bristol, where he did an undergraduate apprenticeship at Rolls-Royce. Reaction Engines offered an annual prize at the Department of Aerospace Engineering at Bristol.

== Career ==
=== Rolls-Royce ===
He started his career with Rolls-Royce Military Engine Division, in the Advanced Projects division. He worked on preliminary ideas for what could have become the RB545 air-breathing rocket engine for HOTOL.

=== Reaction Engines ===
He co-founded Reaction Engines in 1989.

At Reaction Engines, he was working on the successor to the RB545, SABRE (rocket engine). On 22 May 2014 he appeared in an edition of Horizon, called The £10 Million Challenge.

== Personal life ==
He first married Julie O'Brien in December 1998. They have a son (born March 1999). He later married Marianne Suhr, having two sons. He lives in the Vale of White Horse in Oxfordshire.
