= Bob Parkinson (aerospace engineer) =

British aerospace engineer

Robert Charles Parkinson MBE (born 15 July 1941) is a British aerospace engineer who worked on many projects including HOTOL which he cooriginated with Alan Bond.

Dr Parkinson has published numerous papers addressing aspects of advanced aerospace projects; including subjects as diverse as space tethers, space tourism, and reusable launch vehicle architectures.

He was the president of the British Interplanetary Society from 2009 – 2012.
