= British Aerospace HOTOL =

UK spaceplane design of the 1980s

HOTOL
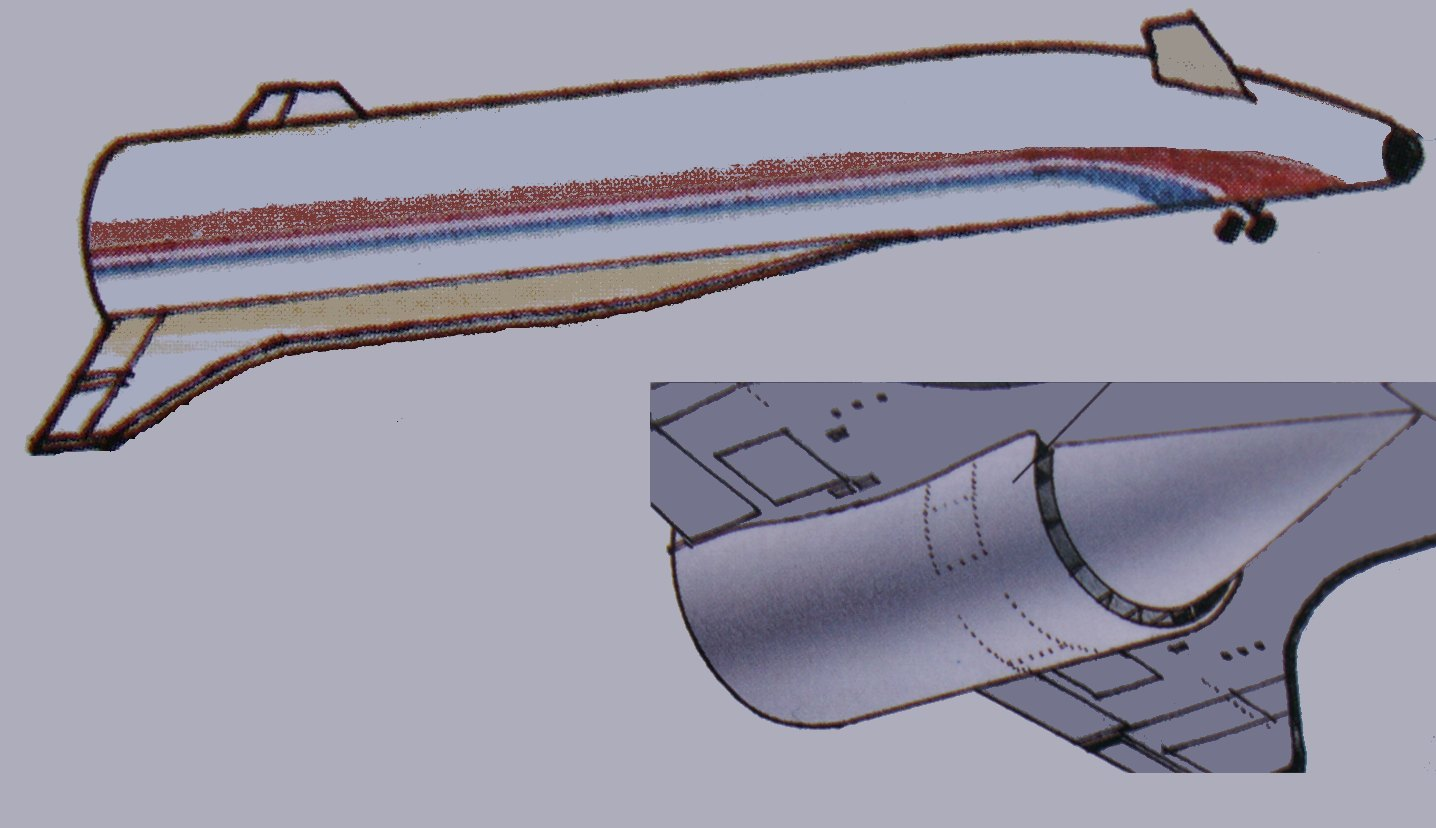
- An artist's depiction of HOTOL

General information
- Type: Spaceplane
- National origin: United Kingdom
- Designer: Rolls-Royce; British Aerospace
- Status: Cancelled

History
- Developed into: Skylon

HOTOL, for Horizontal Take-Off and Landing, was a 1980s British design for a single-stage-to-orbit (SSTO) reusable spaceplane that was to be powered by an airbreathing jet engine. Development was being conducted by a consortium led by Rolls-Royce and British Aerospace (BAe).

HOTOL was to be fitted with a unique air-breathing engine, the RB545 or Swallow, that was under development by British engine manufacturer Rolls-Royce. The propellant for the engine technically consisted of a combination of liquid hydrogen/liquid oxygen; however, it was to employ a new means of dramatically reducing the amount of oxidizer needed to be carried on board by utilising atmospheric oxygen as the spacecraft climbed through the lower atmosphere. Since the oxidizer typically represents the majority of the takeoff weight of a rocket, HOTOL was to be considerably smaller than normal pure-rocket designs, roughly the size of a medium-haul airliner such as the McDonnell Douglas DC-9/MD-80.

While HOTOL's proof-of-concept design study was being carried out, attempts were made by both industry and the British government to establish international cooperation to develop, produce, and deploy the spacecraft. Despite American interest in the programme, there was little appetite amongst the members of the European Space Agency (ESA), and the British government was not prepared to depart from ESA cooperation. Additionally, technical issues were encountered, and there were allegations that comparisons with alternative launch systems such as conventional rocket vehicle using similar construction techniques failed to show much advantage to HOTOL.

In 1989, funding for the project ended. The termination of development work on HOTOL led to the formation of Reaction Engines Limited (REL) to develop and produce Skylon, a proposed spacecraft based on HOTOL technologies, including its air-breathing engine.

== Development ==
=== Origins ===
The ideas behind HOTOL originated from work done by British engineer Alan Bond in the field of pre-cooled jet engines. Bond had specifically performed this research with the intention of producing a viable engine for powering a space launch system. In 1982, British Aerospace (BAe), which was Europe's principal satellite-builder, began studying a prospective new launch system with the aim of providing launch costs that were 20 per cent of the American Space Shuttle operated by NASA. BAe became aware of work by British engine manufacturer Rolls-Royce on a suitable engine, and soon conceived of an uncrewed, fully reusable single-stage-to-orbit (SSTO) winged spaceplane as a launch vehicle.

Thus, the project had soon become a joint venture between BAe and Rolls-Royce, led by John Scott-Scott and Bob Parkinson. Early on, there was an ambition to 'Europeanise' the project and to involve other nations in its development and manufacture as it was recognised that an estimated £4 billion would be needed to fund full-scale development. In August 1984, BAe unveiled a public display of the HOTOL satellite launcher project and released details on its proposed operations.

In December 1984, a Department of Trade and Industry (DTI) memorandum noted that West Germany was interested in the programme, while France had adopted a critical attitude towards HOTOL, which the ministry viewed as potentially due to it being seen as a competitor to French-led projects. According to Minister of Trade and Industry Geoffrey Pattie, French diplomatic pressure to gather support for its own proposed Hermes space vehicle had inadvertently generated support and interest amongst European Space Agency (ESA) members in the HOTOL project. Despite this climate of tentative interest and possible European support, there was a general attitude of reluctance within the British government to take the lead on a new space launcher.

=== American interest and design study ===
In March 1985, there were claims that Rolls-Royce was in the process of conducting licensing talks for HOTOL engine technology with American propulsion company Rocketdyne. In April 1985, Pattie wrote to Secretary of State for Defence Michael Heseltine to propose a two-year £3 million proof of concept study be performed under a public-private partnership arrangement, consisting of £1 million provided by the UK government and the remainder being financed by Rolls-Royce and BAe themselves. Pattie reasoned that the project would serve Britain's "strategic capability", and that tests of key technologies could foster international collaboration. According to aerospace publication Flight International, the support of the Ministry of Defense (MoD) was critical as the design of HOTOL's engine had been classified.

In July 1985, Rolls-Royce's technical director Gordon Lewis stated that the firm sought the involvement of the Royal Aircraft Establishment's (RAE) propulsion group, and that Rolls-Royce was not prepared to invest its own funds into engine development for HOTOL. By the second half of 1985, work had commenced on the two-year concept-of-proof study. Early on, there was considerable pressure to demonstrate the project's feasibility and credibility in advance of final decisions being taken by ESA on the Hermes and what would become the Ariane 5 launch system, thus the work concentrated on the validation of critical technologies involved.

By November 1985, DTI and RAE discussions noted that Rolls-Royce were seeking American data on ramjet technology to support their work on the engine, which it referred to by the name Swallow. Reportedly, the United States Air Force were interested in the technology used in the Swallow engine for its own purposes. In November 1985, discussions between Prime Minister Margaret Thatcher, Minister without portfolio David Young and US President Ronald Reagan's scientific adviser George Keyworth noted American interest in collaboration on developing hypersonic vehicles such as HOTOL, and that a prototype could be flying as early as 1990.

According to British government files, neither BAe nor the MoD were enthusiastic for the prospects of American involvement in the programme, expressing reluctance out of a belief that the outcome of such a move could result in the UK becoming a junior member in a project that it once led. There was also a belief that if Britain chose to pair up with the United States, it would find itself frozen out of work on future European launchers. However, Rolls-Royce viewed transatlantic cooperation as necessary. BAe's head of future business, Peter Conchie, stated that, if possible, HOTOL should become a part of the European space framework. In early 1986, the British government formally approved the two-year study.

=== Problems and criticism ===
In December 1984, project management consultant David Andrews issued an eight-page critique of the programme, noting that the design was optimised for the ascent while exposing itself to extended thermal loads during descent due to a low level of drag. He also claimed that the vehicle offered no capability that was not already available; BAe responded that the criticisms made had been answered. In April 1985, the Ministry of Defence's research and development department deputy controller James Barnes claimed that HOTOL lacked a justification, and that there was no defence requirement for such vehicles. He also noted that the "engineering problems are considerable" and that it was unlikely to enter service until the 2020s; Barnes also observed the HOTOL engine to be "ingenious".

In November 1985, the RAE issued an assessment of HOTOL's study proposal; the organisation believed that HOTOL would take up to 20 years to develop, rather than the 12-year timetable that had been envisioned by industry. The RAE also projected that the project would have an estimated total cost of £5 billion (as of its value in 1985), £750 million of which would be required in a six-year definition phase and an estimated £25 million in a pre-definition feasibility study.

During development, it was found that the comparatively heavy rear-mounted engine moved the centre of mass of the vehicle rearwards. This meant that the vehicle had to be designed to push the centre of drag as far rearward as possible to ensure stability during the entire flight regime. Redesign of the vehicle to do this required a large mass of hydraulic systems, which cost a significant proportion of the payload, and made the economics unclear. In particular, some of the analysis seemed to indicate that similar technology applied to a pure rocket approach would give approximately the same performance at less cost.

=== Shutdown ===
By 1989, the outlook for HOTOL had become bleak. From the onset of the project, support between the British government and industrial partners had been uneven, while the United States had emerged as the only foreign nation that showed willingness to contribute to the programme, in part because of the secrecy surrounding it. There was little prospect for European involvement, ESA having elected to pursue development of what would become the Ariane 5, a conventional space launch system. Rolls-Royce withdrew from the project, judging the eventual market for the engine was unlikely to be large enough to repay the development costs. The British government declined to offer further funding for HOTOL. The project was almost at the end of its concept-design phase while much of the plans remained in a speculative state; the craft was reportedly still dogged with aerodynamic problems and operational disadvantages at this point.

=== Successors ===
A cheaper redesign, Interim HOTOL or HOTOL 2, which was to be launched from the back of a modified Antonov An-225 transport aircraft, specifically was promoted by BAe in 1991; however, this proposal was rejected as well. The design for Interim HOTOL was to have dispensed with an air-breathing engine cycle and was designed to use a more conventional mix of LOX and liquid hydrogen as fuel instead.

In 1989, HOTOL co-creator Alan Bond and engineers John Scott-Scott and Richard Varvill formed Reaction Engines Limited (REL) which worked on a new air-breathing engine, SABRE, which used alternative designs to work around (and improve upon) the Rolls-Royce patents, and the Skylon vehicle intended to solve the problems of HOTOL. They first published these engine and spacecraft concepts in 1993, and continued developing the core technologies, particularly the engine and its frost-controlled pre-cooler; initially supported by private funding, but latterly with support from the European Space Agency, the British National Space Centre, the United Kingdom Space Agency, BAe, and the Air Force Research Laboratory. As of 2017 REL planned to demonstrate a flight-ready pre-cooler operating under simulated flight conditions in 2018, and statically test a demonstration engine core in 2020. REL fell into administration in 2024, ceasing all operations. Neither SABRE (a full-scale working engine; partial prototypes and components for testing not counted) nor Skylon were ever built.

== Design ==
=== Overview ===
HOTOL was envisaged as an uncrewed, fully reusable single-stage-to-orbit (SSTO) winged spaceplane. The uncrewed craft was intended to put a payload of around 7 to 8 tonnes in orbit, at 300 km altitude. It was intended to take off from a runway, mounted on the back of a large rocket-boosted trolley that would help get the craft up to "working speed". The engine was intended to switch from jet propulsion to pure rocket propulsion at 26–32 km high, by which time the craft would be travelling at Mach 5 to 7. After reaching low Earth orbit (LEO), HOTOL was intended to re-enter the atmosphere and glide down to land on a conventional runway (approx 1,500 metres minimum). Only a single payload would have been carried at a time as BAe had judged this to be more economic as it removed any need for satellite interfacing and allowed for missions to be tailored to individual requirements.

During its high-altitude phase, its flight control system would have been linked to ground stations and to space-based global navigation system navigation, while radar would have been used during the take-off and landing phases. In addition to the placing of satellites into geosynchronous orbit or LEO, HOTOL was also projected as being able to also perform the retrieval of satellites and hardware from LEO. BAe promotional material depicts HOTOL docking with the International Space Station (ISS), a feat that the company claimed would have required crewed operation as automated systems were not capable of performing such docking manoeuvres at that time. HOTOL was designed to conduct fully automated uncrewed flights; however, it had been intended at a later stage to potentially re-introduce a pilot. Crewed operations would have required the installation of a dedicated pressurised module within the payload bay.

As designed, HOTOL would have been 62 metres long, 12.8 metres high, a fuselage diameter of 5.7 metres and a wingspan of 19.7 metres.

The final vehicle design (HOTOL-K) had a take-off mass of 275 tonnes. Approximately 82% of that mass was propellant with the vehicle structure being a further 16%. This left just 2% (approximately 5 tonnes) for the payload, leaving little margin for design changes to the basic vehicle structure.

It featured a wing design that had been derived from that of Concorde; its large area resulted in relatively low wing loading, which would have resulted in lower reentry temperatures (never rising above 1,400 °C). Built out of carbon composite materials, there would have been no need for the use of insulating tiles akin to those that comprised the Space Shuttle thermal protection system. The internally stowed landing gear would have been too small to carry the weight of the fully fuelled rocket, so emergency landings would have required the fuel to be dumped.

Almost the entire forward fuselage, ahead of the payload bay, comprised a single hydrogen tank.

HOTOL was designed to have a vertical fin, just aft of the nose, for lateral stability. However, later discussions with NPO Molniya about Interim Hotol made it clear that the fin would have been subject to excessive heating on re-entry (due to interactions between two shock-waves). Consequently, Interim Hotol switched back to a more conventional (but larger) tail-fin.

=== Engine ===
Rolls-Royce RB545 "Swallow"
- Country of origin: United Kingdom
- Designer: Rolls-Royce
- Application: Single-stage-to-orbit
- Associated LV: HOTOL
- Predecessor: SATAN
- Status: Cancelled

Liquid-fuel engine
- Propellant: Air and liquid oxygen / liquid hydrogen
- Cycle: Combined cycle precooled jet engine and closed cycle rocket engine

Configuration
- Nozzle ratio: 100:1

Performance
- Thrust, vacuum: ≈ 735 kN (165,000 lb_{f})
- Thrust, sea-level: ≈ 340 kN (76,000 lb_{f})
- Thrust-to-weight ratio: Up to 14 (atmospheric)
- Specific impulse, vacuum: 4,500 N‑s/kg (460 s)
- Specific impulse, sea-level: 14,780 N‑s/kg (1,507 s)

Dimensions
- Dry mass: 2,500 kilograms (5,500 lb) (excluding intake and spill)

The RB545, which was given the name "Swallow" by its manufacturer, British engine maker Rolls-Royce, was an air-breathing rocket engine. It would have functioned as an integrated dual-role powerplant, having been capable of air-breathing while operating within the atmosphere and operating in a similar manner to that of a rocket when having attained close to and within LEO. This engine would have also been capable of powering the spacecraft to hypersonic speeds. It was a crucial element of the programme, having been publicly attributed as "the heart of Hotol's very low launch costs".

The exact details of this engine were covered by the Official Secrets Act of the United Kingdom; consequently, there is relatively little public information about its development and on its operation. However, material was later declassified when government policy changed to prevent the keeping of secret patents without an attributed justification.

Within the atmosphere, air would be taken in through two vertically mounted intake ramps, then the flow would be split, passing the correct amount to the pre-coolers, and the excess to spill ducts. Hydrogen from the fuel tanks would be passed through two heat exchangers to pre-cool the air prior to entering a high overall pressure-ratio turbojet-like engine cycle — the heated hydrogen driving a compressor to compress and feed the cooled air into the rocket engine, where it was combusted with some of the hydrogen used to cool the air. The majority of the remaining hot hydrogen was released from the back of the engine, with a small amount drawn off to reheat the air in the spill ducts in a ramjet arrangement to produce "negative intake momentum drag". (Note: Due to the split in responsibilities of the HOTOL project, Rolls-Royce were responsible for the engine, and BAe were responsible for the aerodynamics. When BAe wanted to add the ramjet it could not provide thrust, because that was the responsibility of the engine, so instead it was a mechanism for reducing drag.)

To prevent the pre-coolers from icing up, the first pre-cooler cooled the air to around 10 degrees above freezing point, to liquefy the water vapour in the air. Then liquid oxygen (LOX) would have been injected into the airflow to drop the temperature to −50 °C (−58 °F) flash freezing the water into microscopic ice crystals, sufficiently cold that they wouldn't melt due to kinetic heating if they struck the second pre-cooler elements. A water trap could have been added after the first pre-cooler if operating conditions resulted in an excess of moisture.

When it was no longer possible to use the atmosphere for combustion, the RB545 would switch to using on-board LOX to burn with the hydrogen as a high-efficiency hydrogen/oxygen rocket.

== See also ==
- Rockwell X-30 – a scramjet vehicle with which HOTOL would have competed
- Reaction Engines LAPCAT A2 – a design for a hypersonic antipodal airliner
- Liquid air cycle engine – a related engine cycle that liquifies the air
- Saenger (spacecraft)
