= Rocket-based combined cycle =

Type of multiple-engine configuration with a common intake, used in aircraft

The RBCC, or rocket-based combined cycle propulsion system, was one of the two types of propulsion systems that may have been tested in the Boeing X-43 experimental aircraft. The RBCC, or strutjet as it is sometimes called, is a combination propulsion system that consists of a ramjet, scramjet, and ducted rocket, where all three systems use a shared flow path.

A TBCC, or turbine-based combined cycle propulsion system, is a turbine engine combined with a ramjet and scramjet.

A TRCC, or turbo rocket combined cycle propulsion system, is another combination propulsion system that combines an afterburning turbine engine with a RBCC propulsion system.

== See also ==
- SABRE (Synergistic Air Breathing Rocket Engine), a pre-cooled air-breathing rocket/RAM-jet engine based on General Dynamics' exploration of LACE concepts (Liquid Air Cycle Engine) by Reaction Engines, UK.
