= Journal of the British Interplanetary Society =

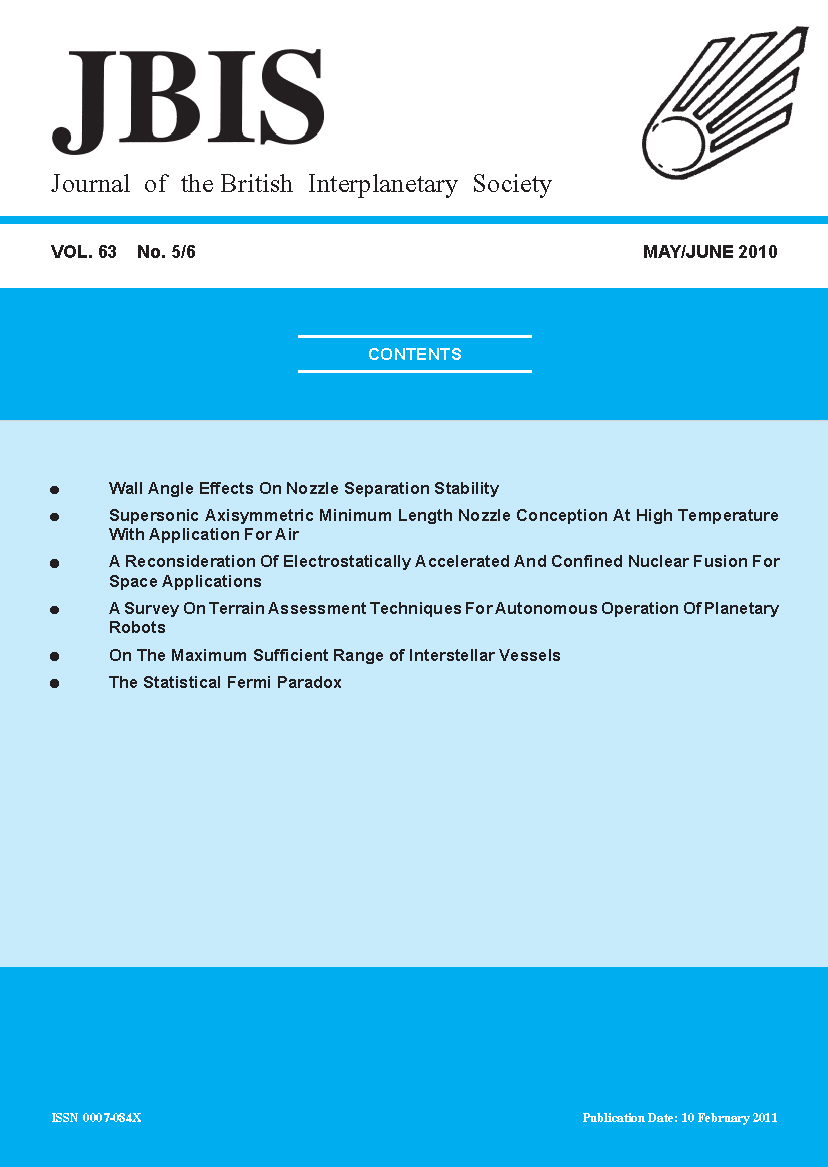
- Discipline: Astronautics, space flight, astrophysics
- Language: English
- Edited by: Dave Salt

Publication details
- History: 1934–present
- Publisher: British Interplanetary Society (United Kingdom)
- Frequency: Monthly

Standard abbreviations
- ISO 4: J. Br. Interplanet. Soc.

Indexing
- CODEN: JBISAW
- ISSN: 0007-084X
- LCCN: sn94095765
- OCLC no.: 219841048

Links
- Journal homepage; Online archives (1999-2015)

The Journal of the British Interplanetary Society (JBIS) is a monthly peer-reviewed scientific journal that was established in 1934. The journal covers research on astronautics and space science and technology, including spacecraft design, nozzle theory, launch vehicle design, mission architecture, space stations, lunar exploration, spacecraft propulsion, robotic and crewed exploration of the Solar System, interstellar travel, interstellar communications, extraterrestrial intelligence, philosophy, and cosmology. It is published monthly by the British Interplanetary Society.

== History ==
The journal was established in 1934 when the British Interplanetary Society was founded. The inaugural editorial stated:

The ultimate aim of the society, of course, is the conquest of space and thence interplanetary travel.....(the) immediate task is the stimulation of public interest in the subject of interplanetary travel and the dissemination of knowledge concerning the true nature of the difficulties which as present hinder its achievements.

The first issue was only a six-page pamphlet, but has the distinction of being the world's oldest surviving astronautical publication.

== Notable papers ==
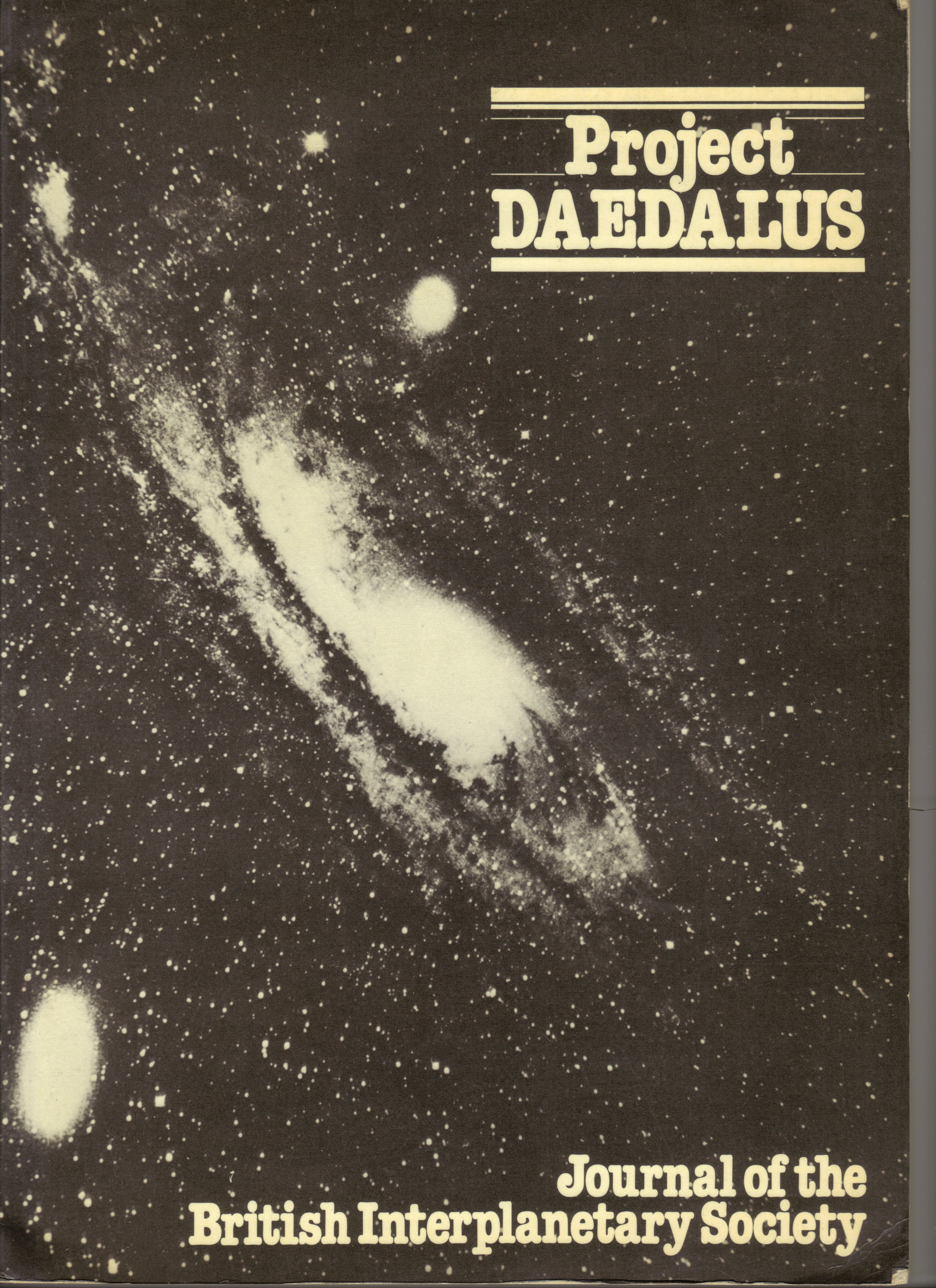
Project Daedalus special issue

Notable papers published in the journal include:

- The B.I.S Space-Ship, H.E.Ross, JBIS, 5, pp. 4–9, 1939
- The Challenge of the Spaceship (Astronautics and its Impact Upon Human Society), Arthur C. Clarke, JBIS, 6, pp. 66–78, 1946
- Atomic rocket papers by Les Shepherd, Val Cleaver and others, 1948–1949.
- Interstellar Flight, L.R.Shepherd, JBIS, 11, pp. 149–167, 1952
- A Programme for Achieving Interplanetary Flight, A.V.Cleaver, JBIS, 13, pp. 1–27, 1954
- Special Issue on World Ships, JBIS, 37, 6, June 1984
- Project Daedalus - Final Study Reports, Alan Bond & Anthony R Martin et al., Special Supplement JBIS, pp.S1-192, 1978

== Editors ==
Some of the people that have been editor-in-chief of the journal are:

- Philip E. Cleator
- J. Hardy
- Gerald V. Groves
- Anthony R. Martin
- Mark Hempsell
- Chris Toomer
- Kelvin Long
- Roger Longstaff

== See also ==
- Spaceflight (magazine)
