= Mark Hempsell =

British aerospace engineer

- Occupation: British aerospace engineer

Mark Hempsell is a British aerospace engineer and CEO of Hempsell Astronautics Ltd. which is currently designing the Universal Space Interface Standard (USIS), a system which aims to standardise berthing, docking and attachment of satellites and other spacecraft. Hempsell formerly worked at Reaction Engines Limited, where he was a member of the board of directors as the Future Programmes Director.

He has a BSc in Physics from Imperial College London and a Masters in Astronomy and Astronautics from Hatfield Polytechnic, now the University of Hertfordshire. As a Business Development Manager he ran infrastructure studies on launch systems (BAe HOTOL, MacDonnell Douglas Delta Clipper), European space stations and the BAe Multirole Capsule.

He was the president of the British Interplanetary Society from 1997 to 2000 and from 2015 to 2018, and was editor of the JBIS periodical from 2005-2009.

== A Sumerian Observation of the Köfels' Impact Event ==
Hempsell got public audience as author of the book "A Sumerian Observation of the Köfels' Impact Event", with Alan Bond proposes a theory not accepted by the scientific community, which describes an asteroid impact at Köfels (Alps) causing a heat downwash far away in the region of Sodom and Gomorrah which burned the cities.
