= Skylon (spacecraft) =

Single-stage-to-orbit spaceplane

- Artist's concept of a Skylon reaching orbit.

General information
- Type: Reusable spaceplane
- National origin: United Kingdom
- Designer: Reaction Engines Limited
- Status: Cancelled October 2024

History
- Developed from: HOTOL (Horizontal Take-Off and Landing) project

Skylon was a series of concept designs for a reusable single-stage-to-orbit spaceplane by the British company Reaction Engines Limited, using SABRE, a combined-cycle, air-breathing rocket propulsion system.

The vehicle design is for a hydrogen-fuelled aircraft that would take off from a specially built reinforced runway, and accelerate to Mach 5.4 at 26 kilometres (85,000 ft) altitude (compared to typical airliner's 9–13 kilometres or 30,000–40,000 feet) using the atmosphere's oxygen before switching the engines to use the internal liquid oxygen (LOX) supply to accelerate to the Mach 25 necessary to reach a 400 km orbit.

It would carry 17 tonnes (37,000 lb) of cargo to an equatorial low Earth orbit (LEO); up to 11 tonnes (24,000 lb) to the International Space Station, almost 45% more than the capacity of the European Space Agency's Automated Transfer Vehicle; or 7.3 tonnes (16,000 lb) to Geosynchronous Transfer Orbit (GTO).

The relatively light vehicle would re-enter the atmosphere and land on a runway, being protected from the conditions of re-entry by a ceramic matrix composite skin. When on the ground, it would undergo inspection and necessary maintenance, with a turnaround time of approximately two days, and be able to complete at least 200 orbital flights per vehicle.

In paper studies, the cost per kilogram (kg) of payload carried to LEO in this way is hoped to be reduced from the current £1,108/kg (as of December 2015), including research and development, to around £650/kg (718USD/kg), with costs expected to fall much more over time after initial expenditures have amortised. In 2004, the developer estimated the total lifetime cost of the Skylon C1 programme to be about $12 billion. As of 2017, only a small portion of the funding required to develop and build Skylon had been secured. For the first couple of decades the work was privately funded, with public funding beginning in 2009 through a European Space Agency (ESA) contract. The British government pledged £60 million to the project on 16 July 2013 to allow a prototype of the SABRE engine to be built; contracts for this funding were signed in 2015.

Reaction Engines conducted tests of components of the SABRE engine in 2012 and 2024. Later in 2024, the company entered administration.

== Research and development programme ==
=== Background and early work ===
Skylon has its origins within a previous space development programme for an envisioned single-stage-to-orbit (SSTO) spaceplane, known as HOTOL. In 1982, when work commenced on the HOTOL by several British companies, there was significant international interest to develop and produce viable reusable launch systems, perhaps the most high-profile of these being the NASA-operated Space Shuttle. In conjunction with British Aerospace and Rolls-Royce, a promising design emerged to which the British government contributed £2 million towards its refinement; British engineer Alan Bond was amongst the engineers who worked on HOTOL. However, during 1988, the British government decided to withdraw further funding from the programme, resulting in development work being terminated. Aerospace publication Flight International observed that HOTOL and other competing spaceplane programmes were "over-ambitious" and that development on such launch systems would involve more research and slower progress than previously envisioned.

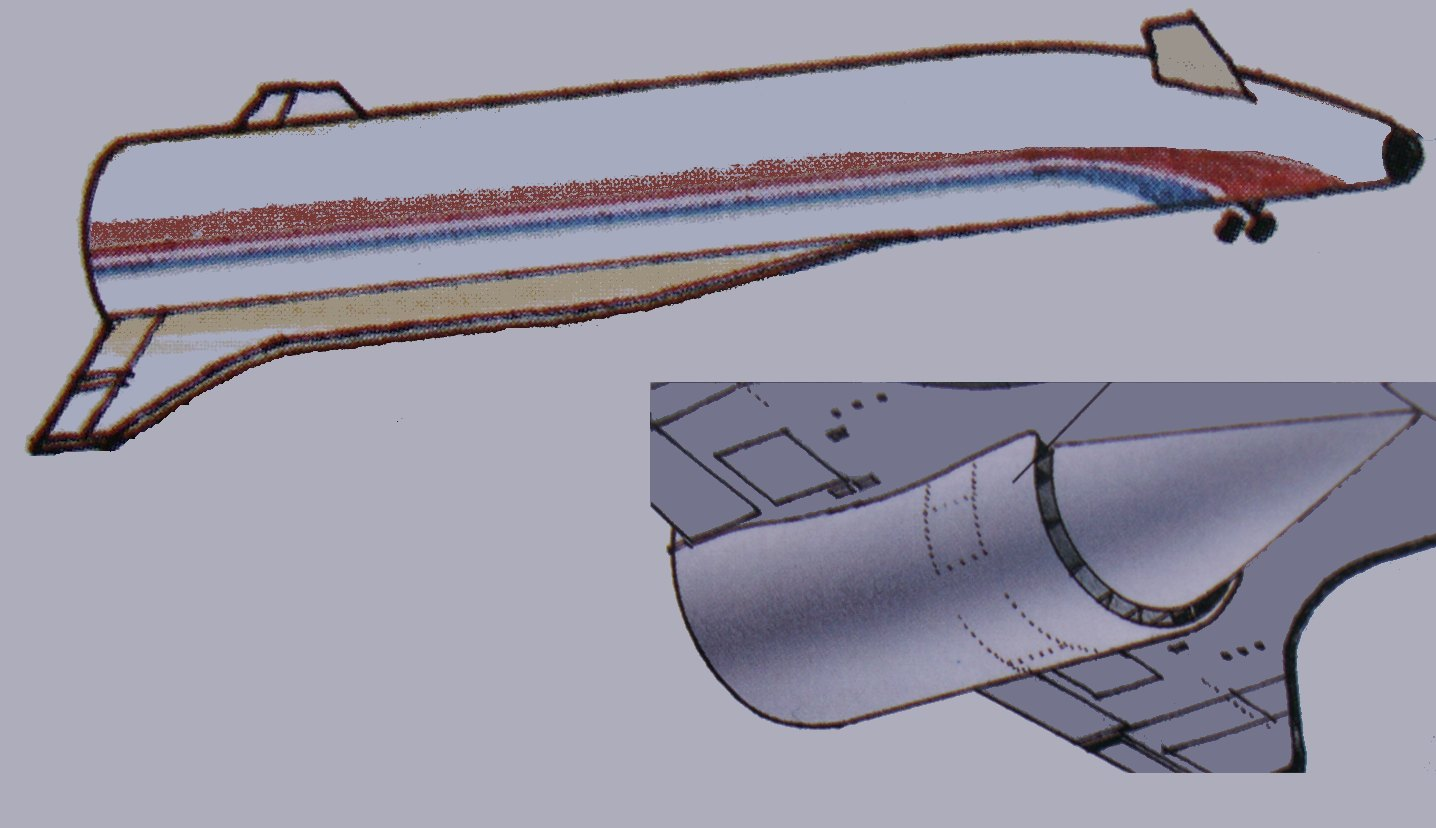
The Skylon was developed from the British HOTOL project.

Following the setback of HOTOL's cancellation, in 1989 Alan Bond, along with John Scott-Scott and Richard Varvill decided to establish their own company, Reaction Engines Limited, to pursue the development of a viable spaceplane and associated technology using private funding. In 1993, Reaction publicly revealed its spaceplane proposal, which it named Skylon after the Skylon structure that had inspired Alan Bond at the Festival of Britain exhibition. Skylon was a clean sheet redesign based on lessons learned during development of HOTOL, the new concept again utilised dual-mode propulsion system, using engines that could combust hydrogen with the external air during atmospheric flight. Early on, Skylon was promoted by the company to the ESA for its Future European Space Transportation Investigations Programme (FESTIP) initiative, as well as seeking out both government or commercial investment in order to finance the vehicle's development. Reaction has also sought to form ties with other companies with the aim of producing an international consortium of interested firms to participate in the Skylon programme.

=== Project brief ===
The Skylon design features several distinct differences when compared with the earlier HOTOL program. Whereas HOTOL would have launched from a rocket sled as a weight-saving measure, Skylon is to be equipped with conventional retractable undercarriage. The revised engine design, using the SABRE engine, is expected to offer higher performance than its predecessor. The rear mounted engine of HOTOL meant that the vehicle possessed intrinsically poor in-flight stability; early attempts to resolve this problem had ended up sacrificing much of HOTOL's payload potential, which in turn contributed to the failure of the overall project. Skylon's solution to the issue was to position its engines at the end of its wings, which located them further forward and much closer to the vehicle's longitudinal centre of mass, thereby resolving the instability problem.

A computer-generated image of the Skylon spaceplane climbing to orbit.

Reaction intends ultimately to operate as a for-profit commercial enterprise which, upon the completion of development, shall manufacture Skylon vehicles for multiple international customers who shall operate their fleets directly, while being provided with support from Reaction. Skylon has been designed with the target of achieving no less than 200 flights per vehicle. According to the company, its business plan is to sell vehicles for $1 billion each, for which it has forecast a market for at least 30 Skylons, while recurring costs of just $10 million per flight are predicted to be incurred by operators. While the Reaction intends to manufacture some components directly, such as the engine precooler, other components have been designed by partner companies and a consortium of various aerospace firms is expected to handle full production of Skylon.

In service, Skylon could potentially lower the cost of launching satellites which, according to evidence submitted to the UK parliament by Reaction, is forecast to be around £650/kg; as of 2011, the average launch cost using conventional methods was estimated to be roughly £15,000/kg. Amongst other prospective operations, Skylon would be capable of transporting payloads of up to 10-tonnes to the International Space Station. Reaction has also completed internal studies into the use of Skylon as a launch platform for a network of space-based solar power satellites, which have been historically unfeasible due to high launch costs.

=== Funding ===
Speaking in June 2011, Reaction estimated that it would require ultimately $12 billion to achieve an operational configuration, which was then estimated to be achieved around 2020, dependent on funding. The obtaining of additional financing for the Skylon programme from the British government has often been difficult. During 2000, Reaction issued an ultimately unsuccessful request for funding from the British government; according to the government, Reaction's proposal had involved an offer of a potentially large return on its investment. However, several officials have emerged as proponents and advocated for the official backing of the Skylon programme. Speaking in 2009, the former UK Minister for Science and Innovation, Lord Drayson, stated of Reaction: "This is an example of a British company developing world-beating technology with exciting consequences for the future of space."

During February 2009, following on from a series of extended discussions with the British National Space Centre (which later became the UK Space Agency), it was announced that a major funding agreement had been established between the British National Space Centre, ESA and Reaction, committing €1 million ($1.28 million) for the purpose of producing a demonstration engine for the Skylon programme by 2011. The initiative, known as the Technology Demonstration Programme, was scheduled to last approximately 2.5 years, during which further financing in the form of €1 million was made available by ESA. The 2009 agreement allowed Reaction to involve several external companies, including EADS-owned Astrium, the University of Bristol and the German Aerospace Center (DLR), in further development work. As a consequence of the enactment of the Technology Demonstration Programme, Reaction was able to transition from a Technology Readiness Level (TRL) of 2/3 up to 4/5 within a matter of months.

By 2012, according to the UK Space Agency, the funding required to develop and construct the entire craft has not yet been secured; as such, research and development work was at that point mainly focused on the engines alone, which was supported by an ESA grant of €1 million. In January 2011, Reaction submitted a proposal to the British Government requesting additional funding for the Skylon project. On 13 April 2011, Reaction announced that the design of the Skylon had passed several rigorous independent reviews. On 24 May 2011, ESA publicly declared the design to be feasible, having found "no impediments or critical items" to be present in the proposal. Speaking on the topic of Skylon in 2011, David Willetts, the UK Minister of State for Universities and Science, stated:

The European Space Agency is funding proof of concept work for Skylon from UK contributions. This work is focusing on demonstrating the viability of the advanced British engine technology that would underpin the project. Initial work will be completed in mid 2011 and if the trial is successful, we will work with industry to consider next steps.

In June 2013, George Osborne, then Chancellor of the Exchequer, stated that the British government would be giving £60 million towards the further development of the SABRE engine. The grant was contingent upon Reaction having an industrial partner. The first grant of £50 million was approved by the European Commission in August 2015.

In October 2015, British defence conglomerate BAE Systems entered into an agreement with Reaction Engines, under which it would invest £20.6 million in Reaction to acquire 20% of its share capital, as well as to provide assistance in the development of the SABRE engine.

In July 2016, the second grant of £10 million was approved by ESA.

In September 2017, it was announced that the U.S. Defense Advanced Research Projects Agency (DARPA) had awarded a contract to Reaction Engines for an undisclosed amount to conduct high-temperature airflow testing at a Colorado, United States site of a Reaction Engines precooler called HTX. Testing work was scheduled to start in 2018, and in March 2019 the performance of the precooler was validated at conditions simulating Mach 5.

In April 2018, Reaction Engines announced Boeing and Rolls-Royce would be joining BAE Systems as investors in the development of the SABRE engine. A total of $37.5 million of new funding is to be provided including contributions from Baillie Gifford Asset Management and Woodford Investment Management.

=== Development ===
The precooler rig that tested the heat exchange system of the SABRE engine.

In 2000, the firm completed work with University of Bristol testing the precooler.

From 2007 to 2009 Reaction worked with University of Bristol and Airborne Engineering on Project STERN (Static Test Expansion/Deflection Rocket Nozzle), which tested Reaction's engine ignition system, a Reaction designed air breathing hydrogen rocket engine, and investigated the flow stability and behaviour of Dr Neil Taylor's expansion deflection nozzle design via multiple test-firings by Airborne Engineering. An expansion deflection nozzle is capable of compensating for the changing ambient pressure encountered while gaining altitude during atmospheric flight, thus generating greater thrust and thereby efficiency.

Work on STERN was continued in project STRICT (Static Test Rocket Incorporating Cooled Thrust-chamber), which investigated the stability of the engine's exhaust flow and the dissipation of the generated heat into the engine walls. The results and designs delivered by both the STRICT and STERN projects were subsequently declared by Reaction to have been "a great success".

Static testing of the engine precooler began in June 2011, marking the start of Phase 3 in the Skylon development programme, In April 2012, Reaction announced that the first series of the precooler test programme had been successfully completed. On 10 July 2012, Reaction announced that the second of three series of tests has been completed successfully, and the final series of tests would begin the following month after the testing facilities had been upgraded to allow testing of −150 °C (−238 °F) temperatures. ESA's propulsion division audited the precooler tests during mid-2012 and found the results satisfactory.

In 2011, Reaction stated that a preproduction prototype of the Skylon could be flying by 2016, and the proposed route would be a suborbital flight between the Guiana Space Centre near Kourou in French Guiana and the North European Aerospace Test Range, located in northern Sweden. Pre-orders were expected in the 2011–2013 timeframe, coinciding with the formation of the manufacturing consortium. In December 2011, Alan Bond stated that Skylon would enter into service by 2021–2022 instead of 2020 as previously envisaged.

In November 2012, Reaction announced that it would begin a three-and-a-half-year project to develop and build a test rig of the SABRE engine to prove its performance in both the air-breathing and rocket modes. Reaction's precooler was tested in 2022 and 2024. Work ceased later in 2024, when the company entered administration. In July 2025, ESA announced that the precooler would be used in their new INVICTUS research programme, which aims to demonstrate hypersonic flight in the atmosphere at Mach 5.

== Technology and design ==
=== Overview ===
The Skylon was to be a fully reusable SSTO vehicle, able to achieve orbit without staging, which was intended to be used principally as a reusable launch system. Proponents of the SSTO approach have often claimed that staging involves a number of inherent complications and problems due to complexity, such as being difficult or typically impossible to recover and reuse most elements, thus unavoidably incurring great expense to produce entirely new launch vehicles instead; therefore, they believe that SSTO designs hold the promise of providing a reduction to the high cost of space flights. Operationally, it was envisioned for the non-crewed Skylon to take off from a specially strengthened runway, gain altitude in a fashion akin to a conventional aeroplane and perform an ascent at very high speeds, in excess of five times the speed of sound (6,100 km/h or 3,800 mph), to attain a peak air-breathing altitude of roughly 28 kilometres (92,000 ft). At that altitude the engine would switch to rocket mode, using onboard oxidiser, and ascend to orbital altitude and velocity. Payloads would typically be deployed prior to the vehicle's re-entry into the atmosphere, upon which it would conduct a relatively gentle descent before performing a traditional landing upon a runway.

The Skylon spaceplane is designed as a two-engine, "tailless" aircraft, which is fitted with a steerable canard.

The design of the Skylon D1 features a large cylindrical payload bay, 13 m (42 ft 8 in) long and 4.8 m (15 ft 9 in) in diameter. It is designed to be comparable with current payload dimensions, and able to support the containerisation of payloads that Reaction Engines envisions being produced in the future. To an equatorial orbit, Skylon could deliver 15 t (33,000 lb) to a 300 km (160 nmi) altitude or 11 t (24,000 lb) to a 600 km (320 nmi) altitude. Using interchangeable payload containers, Skylon could be fitted to carry satellites or fluid cargo into orbit, or, in a specialised habitation module, the latter being capable of housing a maximum of 30 astronauts during a single launch. Richard Varvill, technical director at Reaction, stated of Reaction's market: "we're competing with expendable rockets, a machine that is only used once".

Because the SABRE engine uses the atmosphere as reaction mass at low altitude, it will have a high specific impulse (around 4,100–9,200 seconds (40,000–90,000 N‑s/kg) for SABRE 4, or 3,600 seconds (35,000 N‑s/kg) for SABRE 3,) and burn about one fifth of the propellant that would have been required by a conventional rocket. Therefore, Skylon would be able to take off with much less total propellant than conventional systems. The weight reduction enabled by the lower quantity of propellant needed meant that the vehicle would not require as much lift or thrust, which in turn permits the use of smaller engines and allows for the use of a conventional wing configuration. While flying within the atmosphere, the use of wings to counteract gravity drag is more fuel-efficient than simply expelling propellant (as in a rocket), which again serves to reduce the total amount of propellant needed. The payload fraction would be significantly greater than normal rockets and the vehicle should be fully reusable, capable of performing in excess of 200 launches.

=== SABRE engines ===
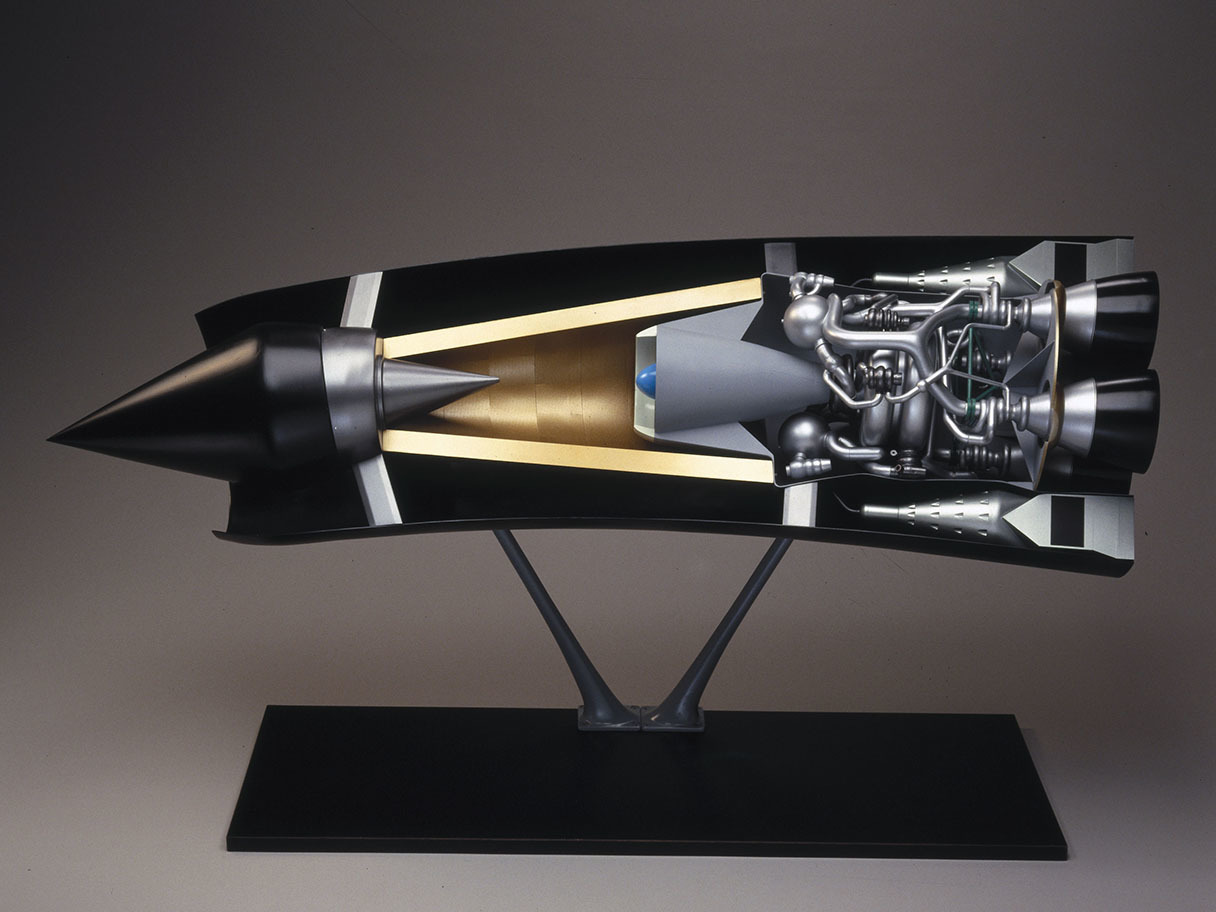
A cross section of a model of an early SABRE engine design

One of the most significant features of the Skylon's design is its powerplant, known as Synergetic Air-Breathing Rocket Engine (SABRE). The design of the SABRE engine has drawn heavily upon the STRICT/STERN experimental engines, sharing many features such as the propellant and the adoption of the trialled Expansion Deflection Nozzle, as well as building upon the wider field of liquid air cycle engines (LACE). The engines are designed to operate much like a conventional jet engine to around Mach 5.5 (6,740 km/h; 4,190 mph), 26 kilometres (85,302 ft) altitude, beyond which the air inlet closes and the engine operates as a highly efficient rocket to orbital speed. The proposed SABRE engine is not a scramjet, but a jet engine running combined cycles of a precooled jet engine, rocket engine and ramjet. Originally the key technology for this type of precooled jet engine did not exist, as it required a heat exchanger that was ten times lighter than the state of the art. Research conducted since then has achieved the necessary performance.

Operating an air-breathing jet engine at velocities of up to Mach 5.5 poses numerous engineering problems; several previous engines proposed by other designers have worked well as jet engines, but performed poorly as rockets. This engine design aims to be a good jet engine within the atmosphere, as well as being an excellent rocket engine outside; however, the conventional problem posed by operating at Mach 5.5 has been that the air coming into the engine rapidly heats up as it is compressed into the engine; due to certain thermodynamic effects, this greatly reduces the thrust that can be produced by burning fuel. Attempts to avoid these issues have typically resulted in the engine being much heavier (scramjets/ramjets) or has greatly reduced the thrust generated (conventional turbojets/ramjets); in either of these scenarios, the end result would be an engine that possesses a poor thrust to weight ratio at high speeds, which in turn would be too heavy to assist much in reaching orbit.

The SABRE engine design aims to avoid the historic weight-performance issue by using some of the liquid hydrogen fuel to cool helium within a closed-cycle precooler, which quickly reduces the temperature of the air at the inlet. The air is then used for combustion in a similar manner to a conventional jet engine. Once the helium has left the pre-cooler it is further heated by the products of the pre-burner giving it enough energy to drive the turbine and the liquid hydrogen pump. As a consequence of the air being cooled at all speeds, the jet can be built of light alloys and the weight is roughly halved. Additionally, more fuel can be burnt at high speeds. Beyond Mach 5.5, the air would become too hot despite the cooling; accordingly, the air inlet is closed upon attaining this speed and the engine instead is solely fed via on-board liquid oxygen and hydrogen fuel, as in a traditional rocket.

=== Fuselage and structure ===
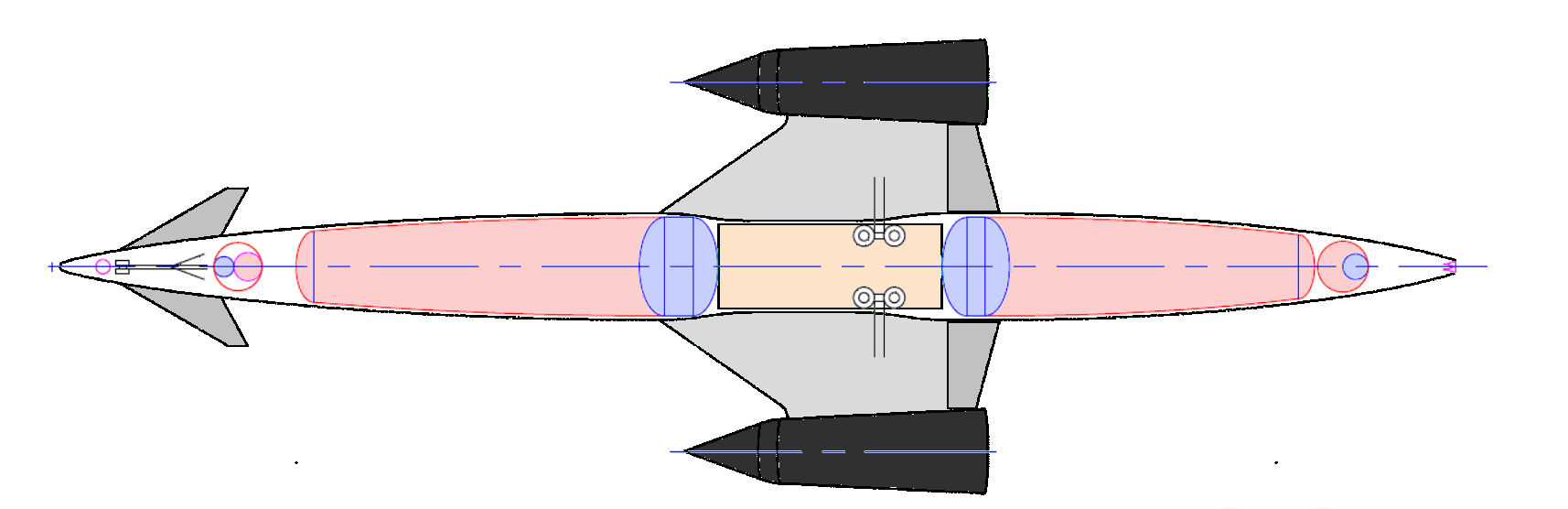
Diagram of the vehicle's internal sections, highlighting the areas allocated to storing hydrogen (red), oxygen (blue) and the payload (yellow)

The currently proposed Skylon model D1 is a large vehicle, possessing a length of 83.13 metres (272 ft 9 in) and a diameter of 6.30 metres (20 ft 8 in). The fuselage of the Skylon is expected to be a silicon carbide reinforced titanium space frame; a light and strong structure that supports the weight of the aluminium fuel tanks and to which the ceramic skin is attached. Multiple layers of titanium foil thermal insulation are sandwiched between the skin and frame to protect the inside of Skylon from the heat of hypersonic flight and the intense heat of re-entry.

Due to the vehicle's use of a low-density fuel in the form of liquid hydrogen, a great volume is required to contain enough energy to reach orbit. The propellant is intended to be kept at low pressure to minimise stress; a vehicle that is both large and light has an advantage during atmospheric reentry compared to other vehicles due to a low ballistic coefficient. Because of the low ballistic coefficient, Skylon would be slowed at higher altitudes where the air is thinner; as a consequence, the skin of the vehicle would reach only 830 °C (1,520 °F). In contrast, the smaller Space Shuttle was heated to 1,730 °C (3,140 °F) on its leading edge, and so employed an extremely heat-resistant but fragile silica thermal protection system. The Skylon design does not require such an approach, instead opting for using a far thinner yet durable reinforced ceramic skin; however, due to turbulent flow around the wings during re-entry, some sections of the vehicle shall need to be provided with active cooling systems.

The Skylon will possess a retractable undercarriage, equipped with high pressure tyres and water-cooled brakes; if any difficulties were to occur just before a take-off, the brakes would be applied to stop the vehicle, the water boiling away to dissipate the heat. During a normal landing, the empty vehicle would be far lighter, and hence the water would not be required, so upon a successful take-off, the 1,410 kilograms (3,110 lb) of water would be jettisoned. When this feature was introduced in the C1 model of the design the weight of the brakes was reduced from around 3,000 to 415 kilograms (6,600 to 915 lb).

=== Support facilities ===
A special runway will be required for launch: it needs to be reinforced to tolerate the high equivalent single wheel load; necessitated by the Skylon's 325 tonnes takeoff weight; it will need to have heat resistant sections at the start of the take-off run and at the rotation zone; and it will have to be 5.9 kilometres (3.7 miles) long to allow the Skylon to accelerate to its 155-metre-per-second (560 km/h; 300 kn) rotation speed, yet still have 1,500 metres (4,900 ft) to abort the launch and brake to a standstill if required. At nearly 20,000 feet, this would be the longest paved runway in the world. The Skylon would be able to land on a 3.2 kilometres (2.0 miles) Code F civil runway.

When on the ground, it would undergo inspection and necessary maintenance, with a turnaround time of approximately two days, and be able to complete at least 200 orbital flights per vehicle.

== Specifications (Skylon D1) ==
A 3-view drawing of Skylon

A diagram of Skylon's internal systems

Data from the Skylon User Manual

General characteristics

- Crew: Zero

The proposed Skylon Personnel/Logistics Module (SPLM) has provision for a captain.

- Capacity: 15,000 kg (33,000 lb) of cargo

up to 24 passengers in the SPLM.
Potential for up to 30 passengers (in a special passenger module)

- Length: 83.133 m (272 ft 9 in)
- Wingspan: 26.818 m (88 ft 0 in)
- Height: 13.5 m (44 ft 3 in)
- Empty weight: 53,400 kg (117,727 lb)
- Gross weight: 325,000 kg (716,502 lb)
- Powerplant: 2 × SABRE 4 precooled jet engine, 2,000 kN (450,000 lbf) thrust each
- Specific impulse:

3,600 s (35,000 N‑s/kg) air-breathing
460 s (4,500 N‑s/kg) rocket

Performance

- Maximum speed: Mach 5.5 air-breathing
- Service ceiling: 28,500 m (93,500 ft) air-breathing

== See also ==
- Reaction Engines A2, a Reaction design for an antipodal airliner using similar engine technology
- CFASTT-1, a similar design by University of Strathclyde
- Reusable launch system
