= Avatar (spacecraft) =

Concept for a crewed single-stage reusable spaceplane

AVATAR
- Function: Robotic reusable spaceplane
- Country of origin: India

Size
- Mass: 25 t (55,000 lb)
- Stages: 1

Capacity

Payload to low Earth orbit
- Mass: 1,000 kg (2,200 lb)

Launch history
- Status: Concept study

First stage
- Powered by: turbo-ramjet, scramjet and cryogenic
- Propellant: LOX/LH2

Avatar (Sanskrit: अवतार, ISO: Avatāra; from "Aerobic Vehicle for Transatmospheric Hypersonic Aerospace TrAnspoRtation") is a concept study for a robotic single-stage reusable spaceplane capable of horizontal takeoff and landing, by India's Defence Research and Development Organisation. The mission concept is for low cost military and commercial satellite space launches.

This spaceplane concept is unrelated to the Indian Space Research Organisation's (ISRO) RLV Technology Demonstration Programme (RLV-TD).

== Concept ==
The idea is to develop a spaceplane vehicle that can take off from conventional airfields. Its liquid air cycle engine would collect air in the atmosphere on the way up, liquefy it, separate oxygen and store it on board for subsequent flight beyond the atmosphere. The Avatar, a reusable launch vehicle, was first announced in May 1998 at the Aero India 98 exhibition held at Bangalore.

Avatar is projected to weigh 25 tons, of which 60% of that mass would be liquid hydrogen fuel. The oxygen required by the vehicle for combustion in outer space would be collected from the atmosphere during takeoff, thus reducing the need to carry oxygen during launch. The notional specification is for a payload weighing up to 1,000 kg (2,200 lb) to low Earth orbit and to withstand up to 100 launches and reentries.

If built, Avatar would take off horizontally like a conventional airplane from a conventional airstrip using turbo-ramjet engines that burn hydrogen and atmospheric oxygen. During this cruising phase, an on-board system would collect air from the atmosphere, from which liquid oxygen would be separated and stored and used to burn the stored hydrogen in the final flight phase to attain orbit. The vehicle would be designed to permit at least one hundred launches and atmospheric reentries.

== Feasibility study ==
The Avatar concept study was commissioned by India's Defence Research and Development Organisation in 2001. India's space agency, Indian Space Research Organisation (ISRO), has no connection with the project. Air Commodore Raghavan Gopalaswami, who headed the study, made a presentation on the spaceplane at the global conference on propulsion at Salt Lake City, United States on July 10, 2001.

== See also ==
Spaceplanes of comparable role, configuration and era

- Boeing X-37
- Buran
- Dream Chaser
- Skylon
- Space Rider
- Space Shuttle
- SpaceShipTwo
