= Reaction Engines Scimitar =

Jet engine

Scimitar
- Type: Precooled turbofan/ramjet
- National origin: United Kingdom
- Designer: Reaction Engines Limited
- Major applications: Transonic passenger airliner
- Status: Concept
- Developed from: SABRE (rocket engine)

The Reaction Engines Scimitar is a derivative of the SABRE engine technology, but intended for jet airliners (the Reaction Engines LAPCAT A2 concept), rather than space launch applications. Consequently, most of the Scimitar engine technology is similar to SABRE but designed for much longer life. Both engines are designed around existing ramjet technology, but the Scimitar engine lacks the rocket features and has high bypass features for greater efficiency. The engines burn liquid hydrogen as fuel.

The incorporation of lightweight heat exchangers in the main thermodynamic cycles of these engines is a new feature to aerospace propulsion. Similar studies of intercoolers used on jet engines show significant improvement of efficiency.
