= John Scott-Scott =

John Lanfear Scott-Scott (22 June 1934 – 12 December 2015) was a British mechanical and aerospace engineer. After graduating from the University of Birmingham, he joined Armstrong Siddeley Motors in 1955, becoming a hydrodynamicist at their Rocket Department. He worked there on Black Arrow, making important contributions to the fuel pump system.

Later he helped to form, and worked at, Reaction Engines Limited until he retired in 2011.

Scott-Scott married Pauline W. A. Cullen in 1955; they had two daughters and a son.

He was the Chairman of the Coventry Branch, Rolls-Royce Heritage Trust from November 2000 until May 2014.
