= LAPCAT =

Concept for a suborbital plane

LAPCAT and LAPCAT II Logos

LAPCAT (Long-Term Advanced Propulsion Concepts and Technologies) was a 36-month European FP6 study to examine ways to produce engines for a Mach number 4-8 hypersonic flight aircraft. The project ended in April 2008. It was funded by the European Commission research and development fund (rather than ESA), and cost 7 million euros.

LAPCAT II, a 10 million euro, four-year, follow on project, started in October 2008. The study aims to refine some of the results of the first study "allowing the definition of a detailed development roadmap" of a Mach five vehicle.

== Objectives ==
Two major technologies were to be considered:

- ram-compression, which needs an additional propulsion system to achieve its minimum working speed.
- active compression, which has an upper Mach number limitation but can accelerate a vehicle up to its cruise speed.

Key objectives were the definition and evaluation of:

- different propulsion cycles and concepts for high-speed flight at Mach 4 to 8 such as turbine-based and rocket-based combined cycles
- critical technologies for:
  - integrated engine/aircraft performance
  - mass-efficient turbines and heat-exchangers
  - high-pressure and supersonic combustion experiments
  - modelling

Intended results were:

- definition of requirements and operational conditions for high-speed flight at system level
- dedicated experimental data-base specific to high-speed aerodynamics for supersonic and high-pressure combustion and flow phenomena.
- setting-up and validating physical models supported by numerical simulation tools to address supersonic and high-pressure combustion, turbulence and transition phenomena.
- feasibility study of weight performance turbine and heat exchanger components

== Results ==
Among the several vehicles studied, only two novel concepts were retained for LAPCAT II: a Mach five vehicle and a Mach eight vehicle.

=== Mach five vehicle ===
The LAPCAT A2 concept in the upper atmosphere.

One possible supersonic transport aircraft being researched as part of this project was the A2 by Reaction Engines Limited. The researchers studied at an aircraft capable of flying from Brussels (Belgium) to Sydney (Australia) in 2–4 hours, significantly reducing journey times across the globe.

To attain and maintain such high speeds, Reaction Engines Limited would need to develop its newly designed concept engine called the Scimitar, which would exploit the thermodynamic properties of liquid hydrogen. The engine would be theoretically capable of powering the A2 to a sustained Mach 5 throughout flight with an effective exhaust velocity of 40,900 m/s or specific impulse of 4170 s, SFC 0.86 lb/(lbf⋅h).

"Results so far show the Mach 5 vehicle from Reaction Engines can avoid later technology pitfalls and could travel from Brussels to Sydney," says ESA's LAPCAT project coordinator Johan Steelant. The developers said in 2009 that it would be able to fly from Europe to Australia in under five hours, compared to around a complete day of travel with normal aircraft. The cost of a ticket was aspirationally roughly business class level.

The A2 design did not have windows. The heat generated by the hypersonic airflow over the body puts constraints on window design which would make them too heavy. One solution Reaction Engines proposed was to install flat panel displays, showing images of the scene outside.

=== Mach eight vehicle ===
Although the cruise flight of the scramjet based Mach eight vehicle seems feasible, the fuel consumption during acceleration requires a large fuel fraction, severely affecting gross take-off weight. Initial studies of a first-stage rocket ejector concept gave poor range with large take-off mass.

== See also ==
- Precooled jet engine
- Reaction Engines SABRE
- Reaction Engines A2
- Liquid air cycle engine
