= Spaceflight (magazine) =

- Discipline: Space exploration
- Language: English

Publication details
- History: 1956–present
- Publisher: British Interplanetary Society (United Kingdom)
- Frequency: monthly

Standard abbreviations
- ISO 4: Spaceflight

Indexing
- ISSN: 0038-6340

Spaceflight is the monthly magazine of the British Interplanetary Society (BIS), reporting on space exploration topics. It was first published in 1956.

In 2008, the magazine – edited by Clive Simpson – was the winner of the Sir Arthur Clarke Award in the category of Best Space Reporting.
