= Gravity loss =

Subject in astrodynamics and rockety

In astrodynamics and rocketry, gravity loss is a measure of the loss in the net performance of a rocket while it is thrusting in a gravitational field. In other words, it is the cost of having to hold the rocket up in a gravity field.

Gravity losses depend on the time over which thrust is applied as well the direction the thrust is applied in. Gravity losses as a proportion of delta-v are minimised if maximum thrust is applied for a short time, and by avoiding thrusting directly away from the local gravitational field. During the launch and ascent phase, however, thrust must be applied over a long period with a major component of thrust in the opposite direction to gravity, so gravity losses become significant. For example, to reach a speed of 7.8 km/s in low Earth orbit requires a delta-v of between 9 and 10 km/s. The additional 1.5 to 2 km/s delta-v is due to gravity losses, steering losses and atmospheric drag.

== Example ==
Consider the simplified case of a vehicle with constant mass accelerating vertically with a constant thrust per unit mass a in a gravitational field of strength g. The actual acceleration of the craft is a-g and it is using delta-v at a rate of a per unit time.

Over a time t the change in speed of the spacecraft is (a-g)t, whereas the delta-v expended is at. The gravity loss is the difference between these figures, which is gt. As a proportion of delta-v, the gravity loss is g/a.

A very large thrust over a very short time will achieve a desired speed increase with little gravity loss. On the other hand, if a is only slightly greater than g, the gravity loss is a large proportion of delta-v. Gravity loss can be described as the extra delta-v needed because of not being able to spend all the needed delta-v instantaneously.

This effect can be explained in two equivalent ways:

- The specific energy gained per unit delta-v is equal to the speed, so efficiency is maximized when the delta-v is spent when the craft already has a high speed, due to the Oberth effect.
- Efficiency drops drastically with increasing time spent thrusting against gravity. Therefore, it is advisable to minimize the burn time.

These effects apply whenever climbing to an orbit with higher specific orbital energy, such as during launch to low Earth orbit (LEO) or from LEO to an escape orbit. This is a worst case calculation - in practice, gravity loss during launch and ascent is less than the maximum value of gt because the launch trajectory does not remain vertical and the vehicle's mass is not constant, due to consumption of propellant and staging.

== Vector considerations ==
Thrust directed at an angle from vertical can reduce the effects of gravity loss.

Thrust is a vector quantity, and the direction of the thrust has a large impact on the size of gravity losses. For instance, gravity loss on a rocket of mass m would reduce a 3mg thrust directed upward to an acceleration of 2g. However, the same 3mg thrust could be directed at such an angle that it had a 1mg upward component, completely canceled by gravity, and a horizontal component of mg×$\sqrt{3^2-1^2}$ = 2.8mg (by Pythagoras' theorem), achieving a 2.8g horizontal acceleration.

As orbital speeds are approached, vertical thrust can be reduced as centrifugal force (in the rotating frame of reference around the center of the Earth) counteracts a large proportion of the gravitation force on the rocket, and more of the thrust can be used to accelerate. Gravity losses can therefore also be described as the integral of gravity (irrespective of the vector of the rocket) minus the centrifugal force. Using this perspective, when a spacecraft reaches orbit, the gravity losses continue but are counteracted perfectly by the centrifugal force. Since a rocket has very little centrifugal force at launch, the net gravity losses per unit time are large at liftoff.

Minimising gravity losses is not the only objective of a launching spacecraft. Rather, the objective is to achieve the position/velocity combination for the desired orbit. For instance, the way to maximize acceleration is to thrust straight downward; however, thrusting downward is clearly not a viable course of action for a rocket intending to reach orbit.

== See also ==
- Delta-v budget
- Oberth effect
