= HAB =

HAB may refer to:

== Places ==
- Hab, Cambodia
- Hab River, Pakistan
- Habrough railway station, England, UK
- Herzog August Bibliothek, a library in Wolfenbüttel, Germany.
- Marion County – Rankin Fite Airport (IATA airport code HAB), serving Hamilton, Alabama, US

== Groups, companies, organizations ==
- Home Affairs Bureau, Hong Kong
- Hokuriku Asahi Broadcasting, a TV station in Ishikawa Prefecture, Japan
- Hospitality Awarding Body
- AirSprint US (ICAO airline code HAB); see List of airline codes (A)

== Other uses ==
- Battle of Hab, a battle fought by Crusaders against Muslim in 1119, in what is now Syria
- "Hab", a member of the Montreal Canadiens (the Habs), a professional ice hockey club
- HAB (rapper), stage name of Abdul Bar Hussein, Ugandan rapper, friend and musical collaborator of Zohran Mamdani; one half of the duo HAB & Young Cardamom
- The HAB Theory, a 1976 novel by Allan W. Eckert
- Habilitation, the highest university degree in some European countries, with the qualification abbreviated "dr hab." in Poland
- Hanoi Sign Language (ISO 639-3 language code hab)
- Harmful algal bloom, known as HAB
- High-altitude balloon

== See also ==
- Rehab (disambiguation)
- Habs (disambiguation)
- Habitat (disambiguation)
- Habitation (disambiguation)
