= Koas Krala =

Koas Krala may refer to:

- Koas Krala District
- Koas Krala (commune)
- Koas Krala (village)
