= Habs (disambiguation) =

Habs is most commonly used to refer to the Montreal Canadiens, a National Hockey League team, short for 'Les Habitants'

Habs or HABS may also refer to:

- Habitants, the early farmers of Quebec
- Haberdashers' School for Girls, (formerly Haberdashers' Aske's School for Girls) a renowned independent girls' day school in Elstree, Hertfordshire, United Kingdom
- Haberdashers' Boys' School, (formerly Haberdashers' Aske's Boys' School and Haberdashers' Aske's School, Elstree) a British private school located in Hertfordshire
- Historic American Buildings Survey, a program of the United States National Park Service
- Harmful algal blooms, a dense proliferation of marine or freshwater algae causing negative impacts to other organisms
- Trenton Habs, an International Junior Hockey League team based in Trenton, New Jersey
- Habs (TV series), a 2022 Pakistani television drama series

== See also ==
- HAB (disambiguation)
- Habitat (disambiguation)
- Habitation (disambiguation)
- Rehab (disambiguation)
