= USIS =

USIS may refer to:

- USIS (company), a US government contractor
- United States Information Service, another name for the United States Information Agency
- Universal Space Interface Standard, an industry standard for docking of spacecraft
