= BS 7988 =

BS 7988 is a standard originally published by the British Standards Institution (BSI) in 2002. It is a code of practice for the use of information technology (IT) in the delivery of assessments, and gives guidance and good practice in using computers to deliver assessments.

== Description ==
The standard is aimed at universities, colleges, awarding bodies, corporations, and other organizations delivering exams, and sets out sensible principles for doing so.

The standard distinguishes three main roles and gives guidance to all three:

1. Assessment sponsors, responsible for assessment content and award of certificates
2. Assessment distributors, responsible for delivering assessments via IT, including developing or specifying the delivery software
3. Assessment centres, where the assessments are taken

== Development ==
BS 7988 was developed by panel IST/43/-/1 of the IST/43 committee of BSI. The panel was chaired by John Kleeman (Chairman of QuestionMark); the secretary was David Keech (BSI). It included representatives from business, awarding bodies, government and education. The wording of the standard was drafted by Christine Ward.

BS 7988 was adopted by the SC36 committee of ISO in 2006, and is shortly to be superseded by a very similar standard with minor modifications aimed to make it international (e.g. without references to specific UK legislation) called BS ISO/IEC 23988:2006.
