= Habitation =

Habitation may refer to:

- Dwelling, a self-contained unit of accommodation used as a home
- Habitation (India), an administrative division in India
- Habitation at Port-Royal, France's first settlement in North America
- Habitation de Québec, buildings interconnected by Samuel de Champlain when he founded Québec
- Habitation La Grivelière, coffee plantation and coffeehouse in Vieux-Habitants, Basse-Terre, Guadeloupe
- Housing, a shelter used as a dwelling or living space by individuals, families, or a collective
- Human settlement, a community in which people live

== See also ==
- Habitation name, names denoting place of origin
- Habitation Module, Habitation Extension Module, for the International Space Station
- Habitat (disambiguation)
