= City & Guilds Ltd =

British training and qualification provider

- Established: 2025; 1 year ago
- Headquarters: London
- Region served: Worldwide
- Chief Executive: Kirstie Donnelly

City & Guilds Ltd is a commercial training and qualification provider that was formed on 16 October 2025 via the City and Guilds of London Institute selling its commercial awarding organisation and skills training activities to PeopleCert, a professional and language certification company. This sale was completed on 31 October 2025. It is the UK's second largest awarding organisation for vocational qualifications, with over 550,000 qualifications issued in 2022/23 and 2023/24.

== History ==
The City and Guilds of London Institute was founded in 1878. Until October 2025, City & Guilds awarding, assessment and training activities operated as part of the Institute's charitable objectives to alleviate barriers to skills and employment. In 2025, the Institute became the City and Guild Foundation and City and Guilds Ltd was formed as a business unit of PeopleCert.

== Investigation of formation and sale ==
The Charity Commission has opened statutory inquiry into the sale with particular reference to bonuses paid to City & Guilds staff, including the chief executive, Kirstie Donnelly, and the chief financial officer, Abid Ismail. As a result of the information, both roles were put on leave. A subsequent internal inquiry found that Donnelly and Ismail had "directly authorised and paid bonuses to themselves" totalling £3 million, in addition to awarding themselves substantial pay increases.

== Qualifications ==
City & Guilds Ltd is an awarding body offering many accredited qualifications mapped onto the Regulated Qualifications Framework (RQF), Credit and Qualifications Framework for Wales (CQFW), and Scottish Credit and Qualifications Framework (SCQF). As of November 2016, City & Guilds offers 2312 different regulated qualifications, more than any other awarding body. These cover entry level to level 7 on the RQF, with most qualifications falling in the entry-level to level 3 range.

- Entry-level qualifications are the basics, for beginners.
- Level 1 qualifications are introductory awards, covering basic tasks and knowledge.
- Level 2 is slightly more advanced, needing some knowledge of the subject area.
- Level 3 qualifications cover more complex tasks and also start the development of supervisory skills. In many professions, level 3 is the benchmark to be considered competent.

The range of vocational qualifications covers areas such as engineering technician, arts and craft, tradesman, health and social care, hairdressing, automotive maintenance, construction, and catering, but also more obscure subjects such as sheep shearing, DJing, flower arranging, and even door supervision (bouncer).

=== National Vocational Qualifications ===
The qualifications available include National Vocational Qualifications (NVQs), most of which are offered at level 2 or 3, although City & Guilds offer NVQs up to Level 7. With 229 NVQs on the Register of Regulated Qualifications (as of November 2016), City & Guilds offers more different NVQs than any other organisation.

=== TechBac ===
City & Guilds launched the TechBac in 2014. This is a baccalaureate-style qualification aimed at 16–19-year-olds and taking in qualifications in technical skills and workplace skills. It is available at level 2 and level 3, with the level 3 awards attracting UCAS points that can count towards admission to university or college courses. The TechBac can be studied in eleven subjects:

- Engineering
- Construction
- Health & care
- Childcare
- Automotive
- Land
- Hospitality & catering
- Business
- Hair & beauty
- Travel & Tourism
- Building services.

== Higher level qualifications ==
City & Guilds offers higher-level qualifications in a wide range of subjects ranging from Professional Engineering, Engineering Technology, Management, and Building Services Engineering to various levels of apprenticeships, for higher technicians, tradesman, Craft, Travel, and Tourism.

These qualifications consist of outcomes competencies-based units, covering core, specialised, and key technical and management areas, which are assessed by means of examinations and written assignments.

=== Higher Professional Diploma ===
Higher Professional Diplomas (HPD) were a suite of awards at level 4 of the RQF for people who want to gain advanced technical skills and broader management knowledge. As of February 2017, most have been discontinued and while the Higher Professional Diploma in Sport and Recreation Management is still running, it is no longer open to new learners.

=== Master Professional Diploma ===
The Master Professional Diploma (MPD) was a level 7 award suitable for those working at higher levels in a relevant industry. It is no longer awarded.

=== Professional Recognition Awards ===
The City and Guilds Awards for Professional Recognition are accredited awards offered at levels 4 (academic first-year undergraduate or certificate of higher education level) to 7 (academic master's degree or postgraduate certificate or diploma level) of the Regulated Qualifications Framework, corresponding to the Licentiateship (LCGI), Affiliateship (AfCGI), Graduateship (GCGI) and Membership (MCGI) of the institute.

=== Professional Engineering Qualifications ===
City & Guilds offers graduate (level 6) and postgraduate (level 7) diplomas in engineering. These have been designed in conjunction with professional engineering bodies to ensure that holders can apply for professional registration as an Incorporated Engineer (IEng) with the Graduate Diploma or Chartered Engineer (CEng) with the Postgraduate Diploma. Candidates for professional registration are considered individually through the normal assessment procedures of the relevant professional body for their specific discipline.

The graduate and post graduate diplomas are offered in five areas: civil engineering, mechanical engineering, electrical engineering, electronic and telecommunication engineering, and information technology. These qualifications can lead to professional registration (IEng or CEng as appropriate) through the following three discipline-specific professional engineering institutions:

- Civil Engineering – Institution of Civil Engineers
- Mechanical Engineering – Institution of Mechanical Engineers
- Electrical Engineering; Electronic and Telecommunication Engineering; Information Technology – Institution of Engineering and Technology
