= Thipakdei =

Thipakdei ឃុំធិបតី
- Commune
- Location within Cambodia
- Coordinates: 12°52′N 103°16′E
- Country: Cambodia
- Province: Battambang Province
- District: Koas Krala District
- Villages: 11
- Time zone: UTC+07

Thipakdei is a khum (commune) of Koas Krala District in Battambang Province in north-western Cambodia.

== Villages ==
- Samraog
- KanTuot
- Ra
- Chay Balangk
- Cheug Tenh
- Ta Thok
- Kouk Poun
- Boeng Snao
- Tuol Mtes
- Koun Prum
- Boeng Reang
