= City and Guilds Foundation =

UK vocational education organisation

- Achievement of arms of The City and Guilds of London Institute
- Established: 1878; 148 years ago
- Registration no.: 312832
- Legal status: Charity
- Headquarters: London
- Region served: Worldwide
- Chief Executive: Mike Adamson
- Chair of Council: Dame Ann Limb
- Website: cityandguildsfoundation.org

The City and Guilds Foundation is an educational organisation in the United Kingdom. Founded on 11 November 1878 by the City of London and 16 livery companies to develop a national system of technical education, the institute has been operating under royal charter, granted by Queen Victoria, since 1900. The Prince of Wales, later King Edward VII, was appointed the first president of the institute.

It is also a registered charity and was the awarding body for City & Guilds and ILM qualifications, offering many accredited qualifications mapped onto the Regulated Qualifications Framework until October 2025 when City and Guilds Ltd was formed as a commercial organisation. The institute's president is the Princess Royal who accepted this role in June 2011 (following her father the Duke of Edinburgh, who held the position for nearly 60 years), and the Chair of Council is Dame Ann Limb, who took office in 2021.

== History ==
A meeting of 16 of the City of London's livery companies in 1876 led to the foundation of the City and Guilds of London Institute for the Advancement of Technical Education (CGLI), which aimed to improve the training of craftsmen, engineering technicians, engineering technologists, and professional engineers. The two main objectives were to create a Central Institution in London and to conduct a system of qualifying examinations in technical subjects.

Unable at once to find a large enough site within the City of London for their Central Institution, the CGLI occupied a building on land alongside Exhibition Road in South Kensington, although its headquarters were in Gresham College in the City. At the time John Watney was both secretary to the Gresham Committee and the CGLI. Evening classes were offered at a school on Cowper Street, off City Road, enabling instruction in chemistry and physics to be provided to those who wished to continue their education after working during the day. The school proved such a success that new premises had to be found in nearby Leonard Street, which was formally opened on 19 February 1893 as Finsbury Technical College. The institute's director at the time was Sir Philip Magnus, later University MP. Finsbury College was intended as the first of a number of feeder colleges for the Central Institution but was almost the only one founded. Finsbury College continued its separate existence until 1926.

The City & Guilds of London Art School was established in 1854, as one of the first Government Schools of Design, in Kennington, south London. It was originally named Lambeth School of Art and was set up to provide training in carving, modelling, and architectural decoration. In 1879 the art school began a close working relationship with the City and Guilds Institute. This lasted until 1971 when the art school became an independent charity. The art school focuses on undergraduate and postgraduate study of fine art, stone, and wood carving, and the conservation of three-dimensional cultural artefacts, books, and paper. The City and Guilds Institute maintains a link with the art school through its charitable grant support of projects delivering Widening Participation activity.

Since 2015, the City & Guilds Group has moved back into delivering training as well as offering qualifications. This was originally through its acquisition of the Oxford Group but has since included the acquisition of Adelaide-based e3Learning, an Australian corporate e-learning and compliance provider, and the Cumbrian-based specialist nuclear industry training provider Gen2.

=== City and Guilds College ===
Faced with their continuing inability to find a substantial site, the companies were eventually persuaded by the secretary of the Science and Art Department, General Sir John Donnelly (who was also a Royal Engineer) to found their institution on the 87-acre (350,000 m^{2}) site at South Kensington bought by the 1851 Exhibition Commissioners (for £342,500) for 'purposes of art and science' in perpetuity.

The Central Technical College building was designed by Alfred Waterhouse, better known as the architect of the Natural History Museum. Located adjacent to the Central Institute on the site were the Royal School of Mines and the Royal College of Science.

In 1907, the latter two colleges were incorporated by royal charter into the Imperial College of Science and Technology, and the CGLI Central Technical College was renamed the City and Guilds College in 1907, but not incorporated into Imperial College until 1910.

Although the City and Guilds College was for much of its life governed through Imperial College, the City and Guilds Institute, together with a number of livery companies in their own right, maintained seats on the governing body (the Court) of Imperial College until its reorganisation in 2002. In 2002, under Imperial College's new faculty structure, City and Guilds College, along with the other constituent colleges, ceased to exist as a separate entity. In September 2013 the Mechanical and Aeronautical engineering building at Imperial College was renamed City and Guilds Building to acknowledge the historical legacy. Its name also survives however in the City & Guilds College Union (CGCU)—the student union for the Imperial College Faculty of Engineering and the Imperial College Business School—and in the City & Guilds College Association (CGCA).

Alumni of the CGLI Central Technical College, the City and Guilds College, and the new Imperial College Faculty of Engineering, unite under the City & Guilds College Association. Established in 1897 as the Old Centralians, the Association adopted its current name in 1992.

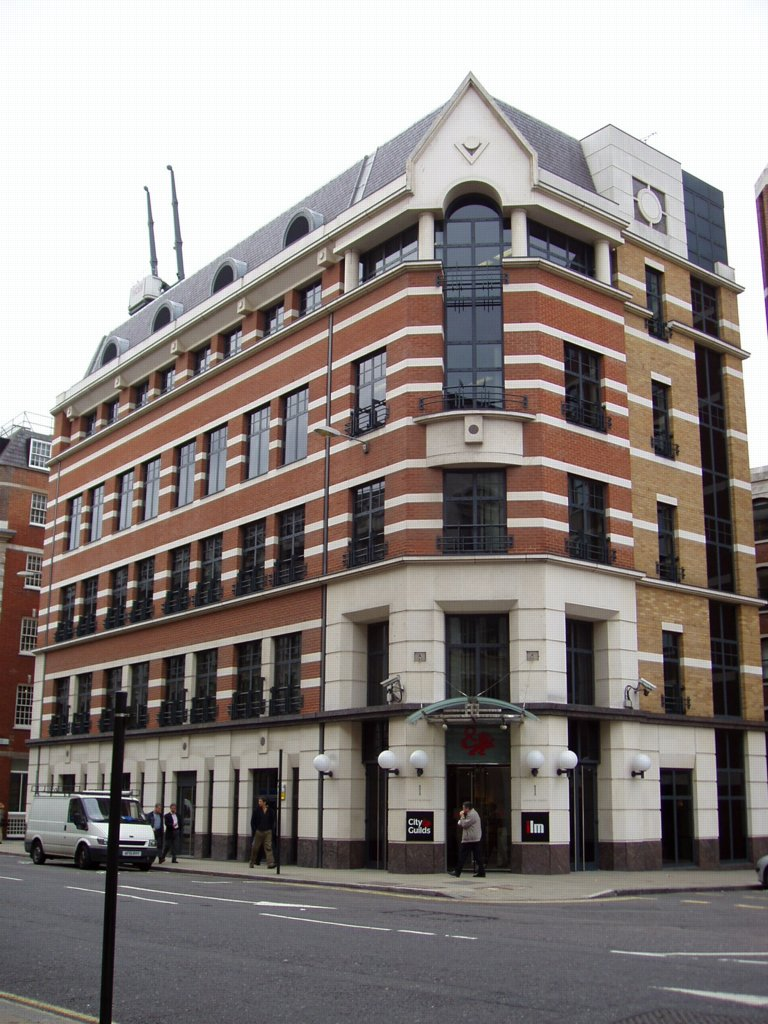
Headquarters of City & Guilds

=== CGLI examination and accreditation bodies ===
In 1953 the Associated Examinations Board (AEB) was established and administered by City & Guilds.

1964 saw the creation of the National Examining Board for Supervisory Management (NEBSM) as part of the City & Guilds group, specialising in qualifications for supervisors and junior managers.

In 1973, the Technician Education Council (TEC) was created to unify technical education, eventually taking over the validation of courses in further and higher education. These courses led to Ordinary National Certificates and Diplomas (ONC/Ds) and Higher National Certificates and Diplomas (HNC/Ds), which were previously the responsibility of professional bodies. It also saw the introduction of the City & Guilds Mnemonic Code for computer teaching.

In 1974, the Business Education Council (BEC) was established, again administered by City & Guilds. This had the remit to rationalise and improve the relevance of sub-degree vocational education in Further Education and Higher Education colleges and in Polytechnics. Within 18 months, BEC took over responsibility for non-technical ONCs, ONDs, HNCs, HNDs, and other qualifications.

BEC merged with TEC in 1984 to form the separately administered Business & Technology Education Council (BTEC). This then merged with the University of London Examinations & Assessment Council (ULEAC) in 1996 to form Edexcel.

In 1990 City & Guilds purchased the Pitman Examinations Institute, and Pitman Qualifications Single Subject awards in business and administration and English language proved to be successful worldwide.

In 2002, the Institute of Leadership & Management (ILM) was formed through the merger of NEBSM and the Institute of Supervisory Management (ISM) and became part of the City & Guilds Group.

In 2004, the National Proficiency Tests Council (NPTC) – specialists for agricultural land-based qualifications – became part of the City & Guilds Group.

In 2005, the Hospitality Awarding Body (HAB) – specialists in awards for hospitality and catering – became part of the City & Guilds Group. In January 2010, all active candidates were transferred to City & Guilds courses to remove duplicate award provisions across the Group.

In 2008, the City & Guilds Centre for Skills Development was formed as part of the City & Guilds Group. Its mission is to influence and improve skills policy and practice worldwide through an evidence-based approach.

== Charitable purpose ==
The charitable aims of the City and Guilds of London Institute are:

"Providing internationally recognised qualifications, awards, assessments and support for individuals and organisations in the United Kingdom and overseas across a wide range of occupations in industry, commerce, the public services and elsewhere."

The charitable objects of the institute, as defined in its royal charter, are:

"For the purposes of all such branches of science and the fine arts and for the advancement, dissemination, propagation, promotion, culture, and application of all such branches of science and the fine arts as a benefit or are of use to or may benefit or be of use to productive and technical industries especially and to commerce and industry generally or any branch thereof."

=== Associateship (ACGI) ===
The Associateship of the City and Guilds of London Institute is awarded to undergraduates of the Faculty of Engineering at Imperial College London upon completion of their studies. It is a legacy of the historic City and Guilds College and association between the City and Guilds of London and the college. It is considered a level 6 NVQ qualification, despite involving only academic components, and associates are eligible to use the post-nominal letters ACGI.

=== Fellowship (FCGI) ===
Fellowship (FCGI) is the highest honour conferred by the Council of the City and Guilds of London Institute to recognise outstanding professional and personal achievement. Fellows are leaders of industry, education & academia or government & public sector who have achieved remarkable success in their respective fields. Generally, they hold senior roles such as CEOs, board members or specialist employees or consultants at the national or international level. The FCGI is equivalent to level 8 on the Regulated Qualifications Framework (RQF), the same level as a PhD or Professional Doctorate.

=== Recognition ===
- Professional recognition awards authorised by royal charter.
- Professional recognition awards are accredited by Ofqual and included on the Register of Regulated Qualifications.
- Vocational qualifications accredited by Ofqual and included on the Register of Regulated Qualifications.

== Arms ==
The College of Arms has granted the following arms to the institute:

Coat of arms of City and Guilds Foundation
| Notes 9 September 1955 Crest On a wreath Argent and Gules, a dexter cubit arm, vested bendy sinister Argent and Gules, the hand Proper grasping a sword also Gules, the blade enfiled with a mural crown also Argent. Escutcheon Argent, a cross Gules surmounted of a sun Or; a chief of the Second, thereon a lion passant Gold gorged with a naval crown Azure. Supporters On the dexter side a unicorn Or, armed, crined, tufted and unguled Argent, and on the sinister side a griffin Gold Pellettee. |
