= Confederation of Tourism and Hospitality =

UK specialist awarding organisation

Confederation of Tourism & Hospitality
- Abbreviation: CTH
- Formation: 1982; 44 years ago
- Type: Qualification awarding organisation
- Headquarters: London, England, UK
- Affiliations: Ofqual
- Website: cthawards.com

The Confederation of Tourism & Hospitality (CTH) is a specialist awarding organisation, offering vocational qualifications for the hospitality, culinary and tourism industries, worldwide.

CTH is recognised and regulated by Ofqual, the regulator for qualifications, exams and tests in England.

== History ==
Established in 1982, under the name Confederation of Tourism, Hotel and Catering Management (CTHCM), CTHCM was formed to focus on the training needs of learners with aspirations of establishing a career in the hospitality and tourism industries.

On 18 June 2008, the name Confederation of Tourism, Hotel and Catering Management was officially changed to Confederation of Tourism and Hospitality.

== Function ==
It provides standards for training in the hospitality, tourism and culinary industries in the UK. Over 7000 people a year take their qualifications.

CTH has a Corporate Social Responsibility (CSR) partner network which includes such companies as Fifty Shades Greener, Stonewall and Sustainable Hospitality Alliance.

== Accreditation ==
Its awards are regulated by Ofqual, the Department for Children, Education, Lifelong Learning and Skills (DCELLS), and the Council for the Curriculum, Examinations & Assessment (CCEA).

CTH is a member of the Federation of Awarding Bodies. Its management qualifications are endorsed by over 25 British and international universities. CTH works with British Accreditation Council (BAC), British Council and Accreditation Service for International Colleges (ASIC) accredited colleges in the UK and Ireland and with its support, CTH expects centres to achieve suitable quality thresholds to enable effective training on its programmes.

== See also ==
- Qualification awarding bodies in the United Kingdom
- British Institute of Innkeeping Awarding Body
