= Chhnal Moan =

Commune in Koas Krala District, Battambang Province, Cambodia

Coordinates: 12°30′N 103°42′E

Chhnal Moan ឃុំឆ្នាល់មាន់
- Commune
- Interactive map of Chhnal Moan
- Country: Cambodia
- Province: Battambang Province
- District: Koas Krala District
- Villages: 8
- Time zone: UTC+07

Chhnal Moan (Khmer: ឆ្នាល់មាន់) is a khum (commune) of Koas Krala District in Battambang Province in north-western Cambodia.

== Chhnal ==
- Chhnal Moan
- Krang Svat
- Banteay Char
- Ruessei Preah
- Prey Sen
- Prey Totueng
- Samraong
