= Doun Ba =

Commune in Koas Krala District, Battambang Province, Cambodia

Coordinates: 12°46′N 103°14′E

Doun Ba ឃុំដូនបា
- Commune
- Interactive map of Doun Ba
- Country: Cambodia
- Province: Battambang Province
- District: Koas Krala District
- Villages: 8
- Time zone: UTC+07

Doun Ba (Khmer: ឃុំដូនបា) is a khum (commune) of Koas Krala District in Battambang Province in north-western Cambodia.

== Villages ==
- Ba Srae
- Doun Ba
- Prey Phnheas
- Tuol Lieb
- Kouk Roka
- Khlaeng Kong
- Khvaeng
- Prey Paen
