= Habitation Module =

Cancelled NASA component of the International Space Station; living quarters

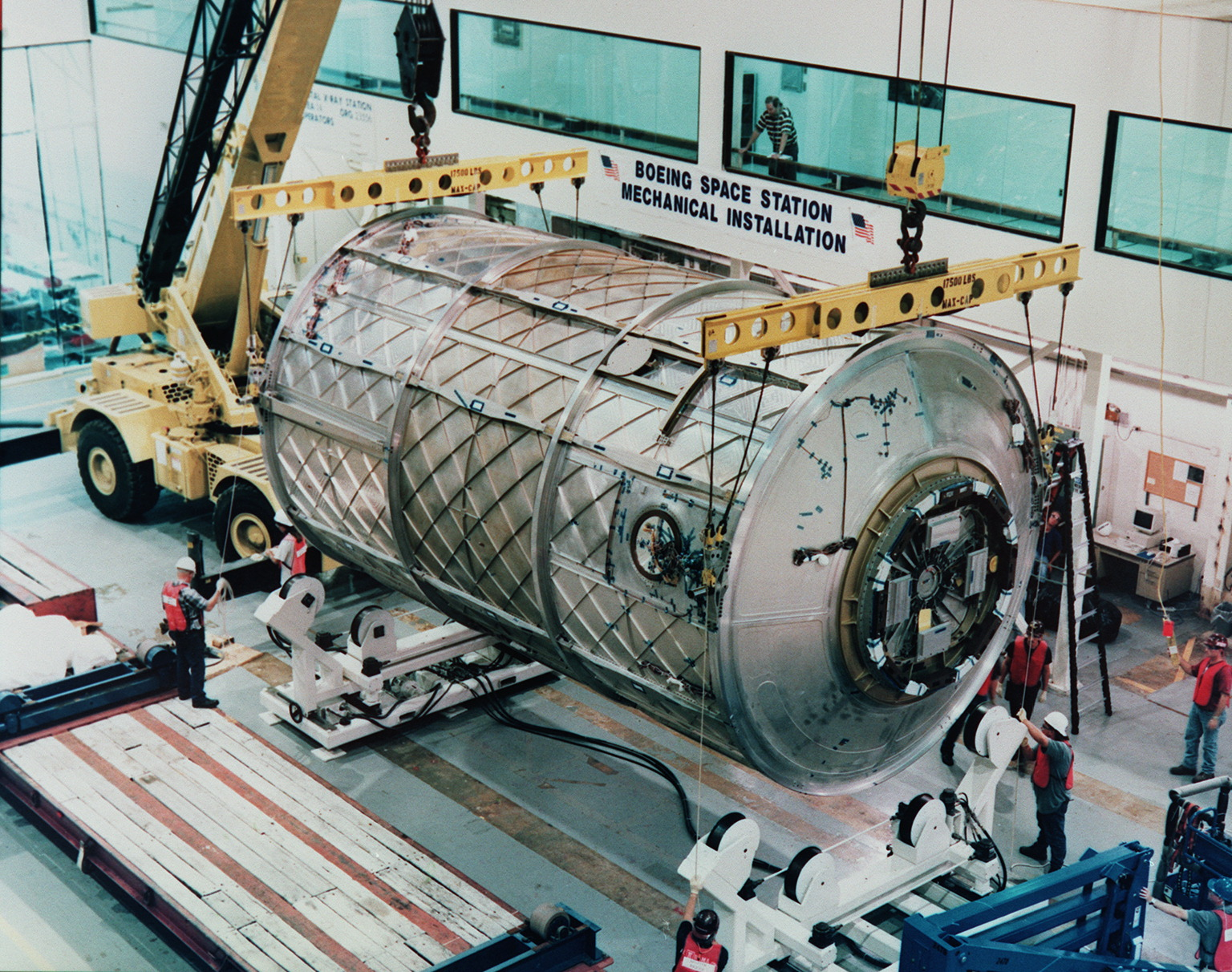
ISS Habitation module under construction in December 1997

The Habitation Module for the International Space Station (ISS) was intended to serve as the station's primary living quarters. About the size of a bus, it was designed to include a galley, toilet, shower, sleeping quarters, and medical facilities. Construction of the pressurized hull was completed, but the module was ultimately canceled before launch. If it had been flown, the module would have been berthed to Tranquility.

== History ==
Early ISS planning required a dedicated habitation module in order to support crews larger than three people. However, at the time, a second crew return vehicle was not yet available to supplement the single Soyuz-TMA spacecraft. Budget constraints, along with schedule delays following the Space Shuttle Columbia disaster in 2003, led to the module's cancellation. On 14 February 2006, NASA announced that the completed hull would be repurposed for ground-based life support research in preparation for future exploration missions.

Many of the functions intended for the Habitation Module were later incorporated into other modules of the U.S. Orbital Segment. Four sleeping quarters were installed inside the Harmony module in 2007, while the Tranquility module, added in 2010, houses a toilet, environmental control systems, life support systems, and exercise equipment. The Russian Orbital Segment also provides crew accommodations, with two sleeping quarters in Zvezda and an additional one in the Nauka module, added in 2021.

== Design ==
The Habitation Module was to contain four 3.2-cubic-meter (110 cu ft) crew quarters originally developed for Space Station Freedom, each offering storage space and an integrated workstation. By comparison, the sleeping quarters eventually installed in Harmony in 2007 are smaller at 2.1 cubic meters (74 cu ft) and provide less storage, limited thermal control, and no dedicated workspace.

Although individual bunks are not strictly necessary in microgravity, visiting astronauts typically secure sleeping bags to the wall of a module, experience dating back to Salyut 6 demonstrated the psychological benefits of private quarters during long-duration missions. Privacy is considered an important countermeasure for managing stress in the confined and isolated environment of spaceflight.

== Alternative concepts ==
During ISS development, NASA also studied the inflatable TransHab module, which would have offered several times more volume than the baseline Habitation Module. The concept was later revived with the Bigelow Expandable Activity Module, delivered to the ISS in 2016 aboard a Dragon cargo spacecraft for in-orbit testing. Engineers in the United Kingdom have also proposed a "Habitation Extension Module" that could be attached to Tranquility.

== See also ==
- Habitation Extension Module - proposed ISS module
- Zvezda - base crew module of the ISS
