= Cupola (ISS module) =

Observation module of the International Space Station

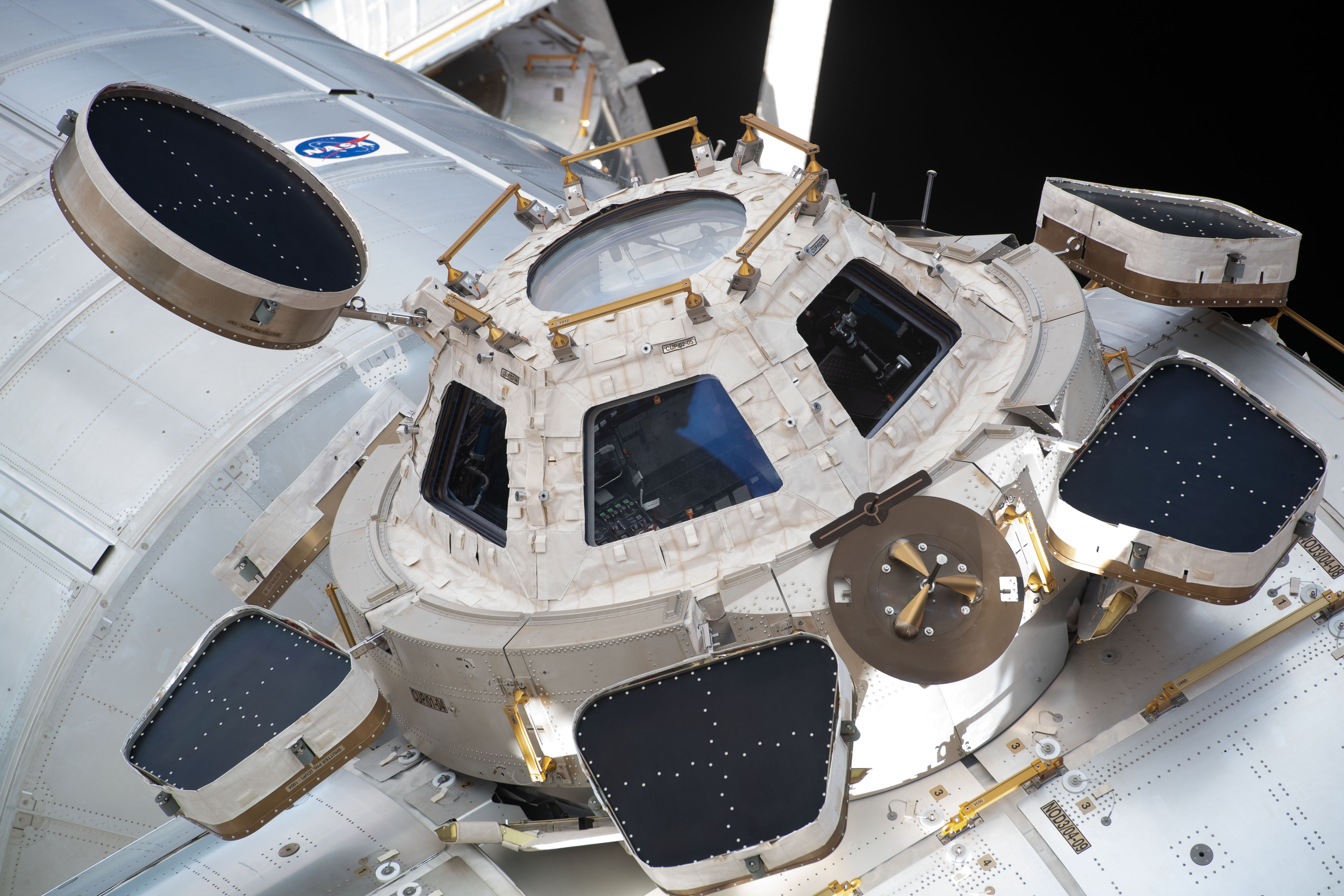
- Exterior of Cupola with shutters open

Module statistics
- COSPAR ID: 2010-004B
- Launch date: 8 February 2010, 09:14:08 UTC
- Launch vehicle: Space Shuttle Endeavour
- Berthed: 15 February 2010
- Mass: 1,880 kg (4,145 lb)
- Height: 1.5 m (4.9 ft)
- Diameter: 2.95 m (9.68 ft)

The Cupola is an ESA-built observatory module of the International Space Station (ISS). Its name derives from the Italian word cupola, which means "dome". Its seven windows are used to conduct experiments, dockings and observations of Earth. It was launched aboard Space Shuttle Endeavour's mission STS-130 on 8 February 2010, and attached to the Tranquility (Node 3) module. With the Cupola attached, ISS assembly reached 85 percent completion. The Cupola's central window has a diameter of 80 cm (31 in).

== Overview ==
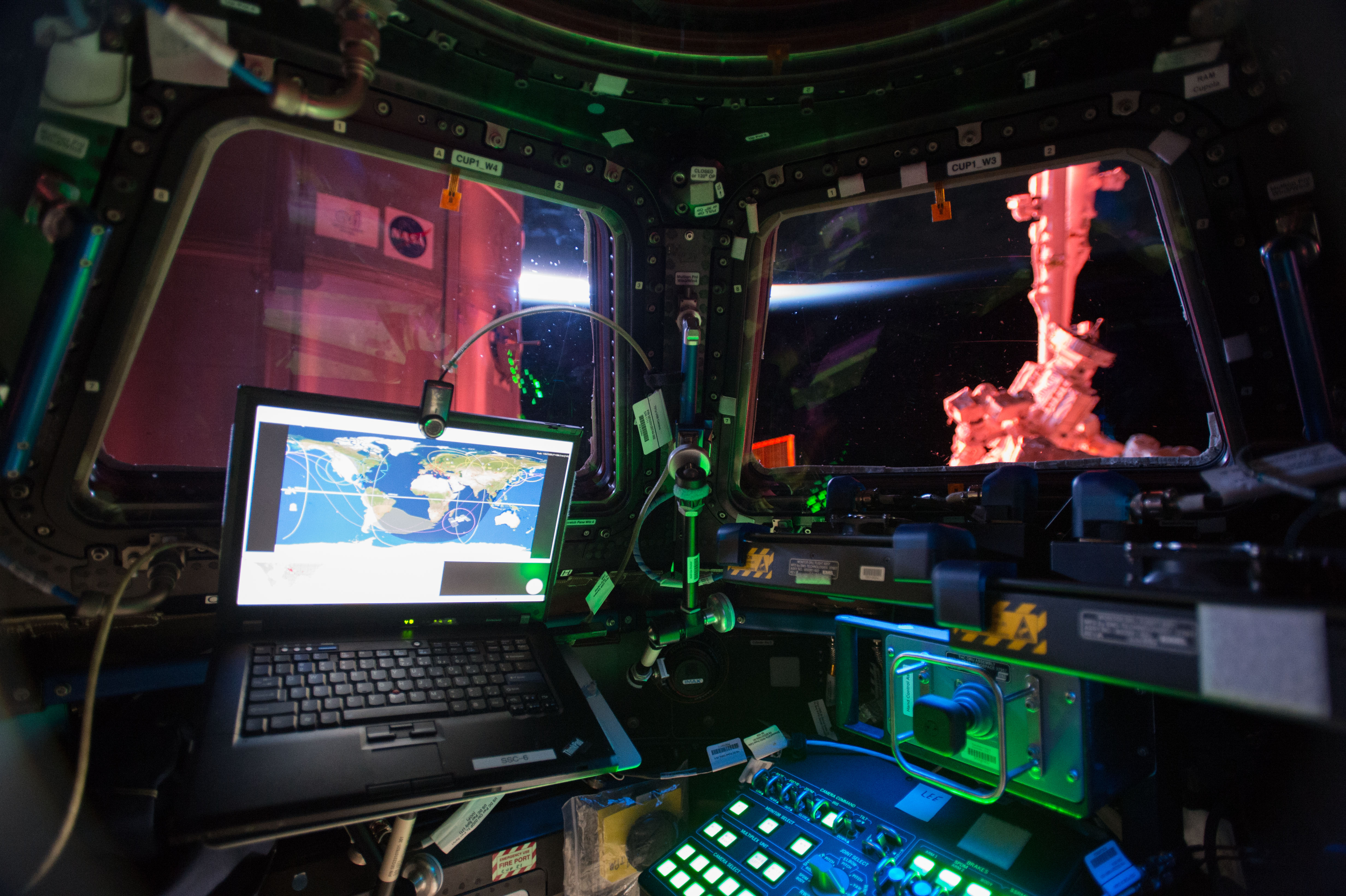
A laptop with the ISS orbital location in the Cupola during sunset

The Cupola provides an observation and work area for the ISS crew giving visibility to support the control of the space station remote manipulator system and general external viewing of Earth, celestial objects and visiting vehicles. The Cupola project was started by NASA and Boeing, but canceled due to budget cuts. A barter agreement between NASA and the ESA resulted in the Cupola's development being resumed in 1998 by ESA.

The Cupola is important to astronauts aboard the ISS, who enjoy using the module to view and photograph the Earth. Cupola replaced the Russian Zvezda for such photographs. Previously they looked out of small portholes, or at best the 20-inch (50 cm) window in the US Destiny laboratory. The Cupola is berthed onto the Earth-facing port of the Tranquility module. Because of its shape and multi window configuration the Cupola has been compared to the cockpit window of the Millennium Falcon.

== Design and construction ==
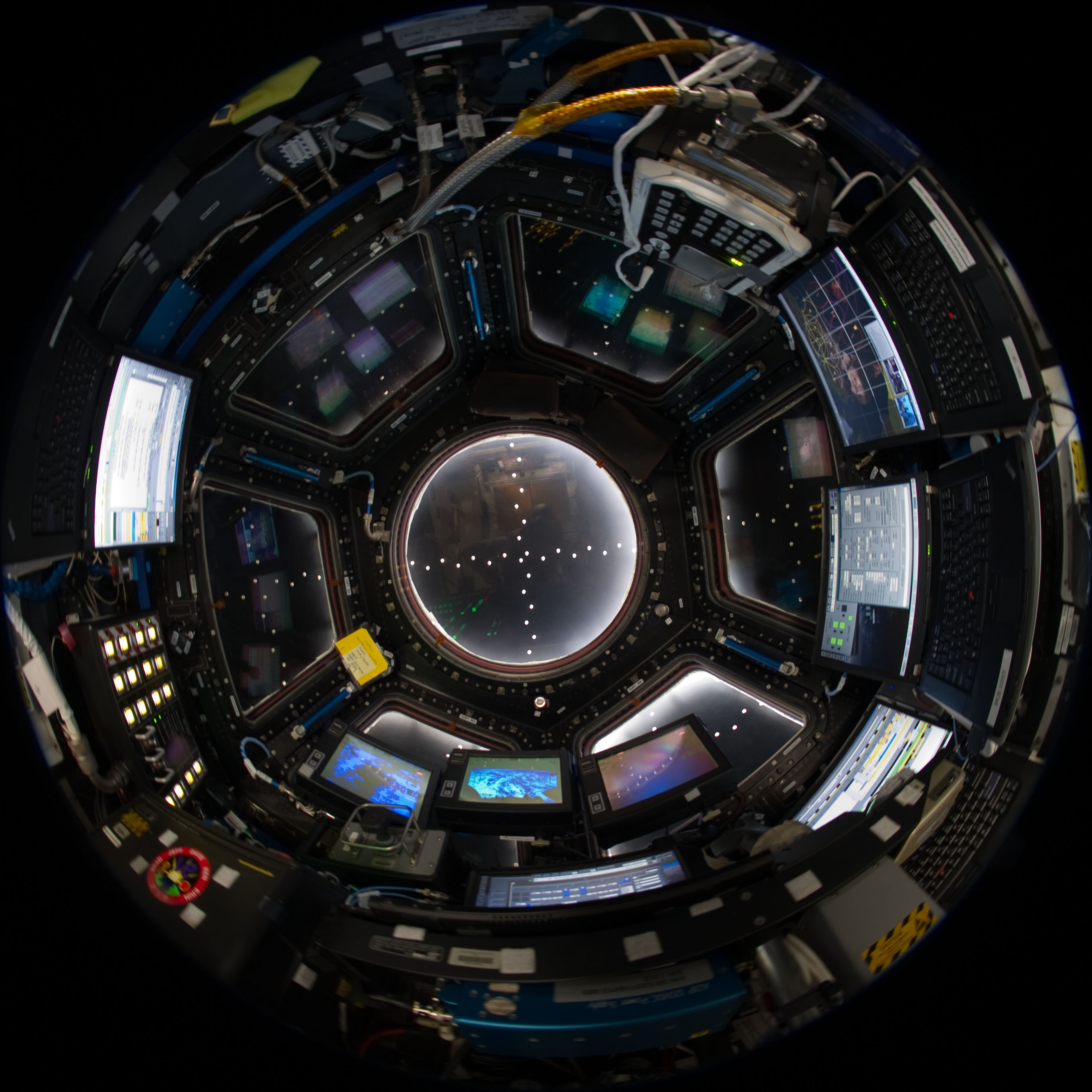
Fish-eye lens view of the interior of Cupola with shutters closed

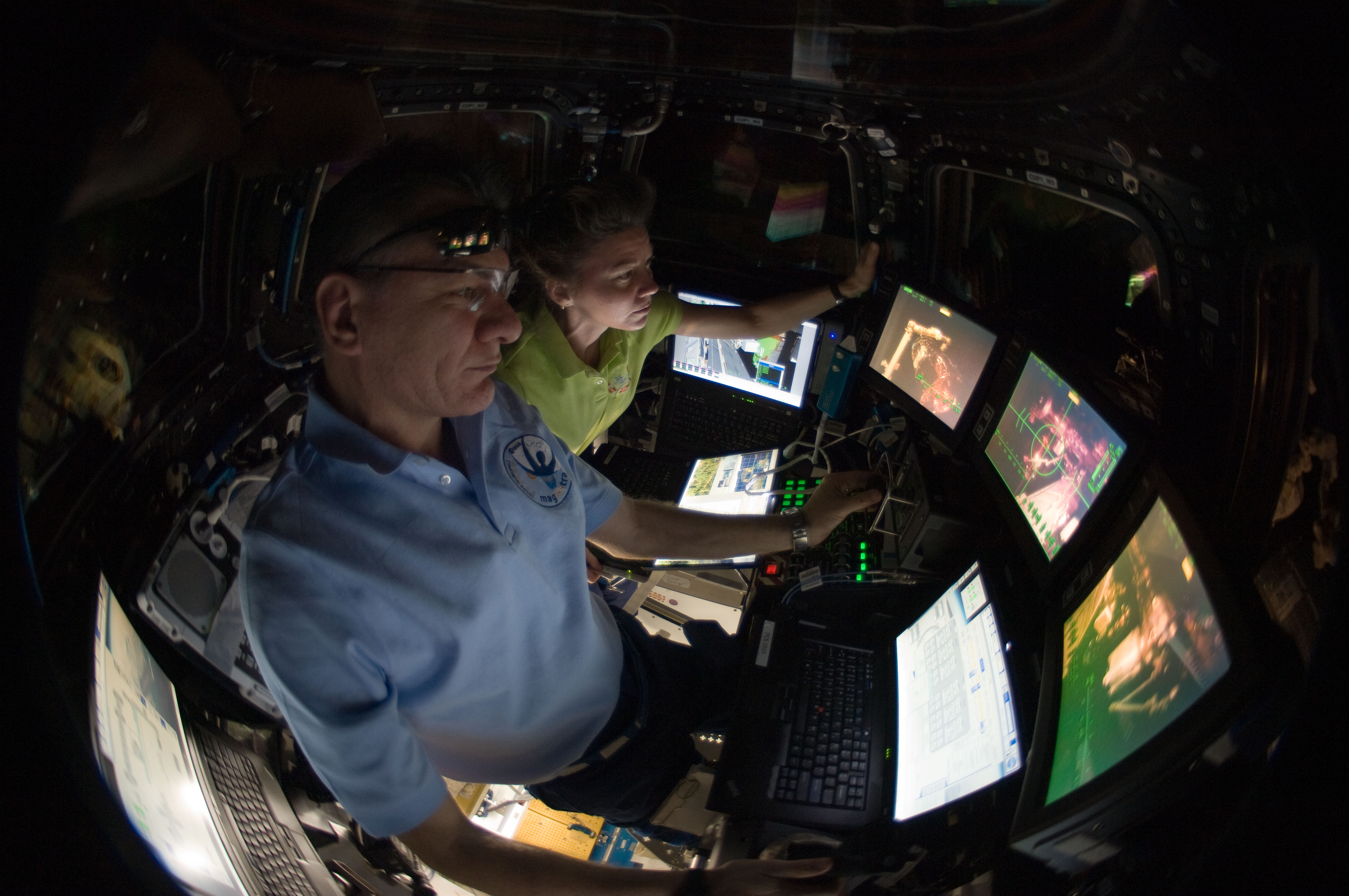
Berthing operations within Cupola

The International Space Station Cupola was first conceived in 1987 by Space Station Man-Systems Architectural Control Manager Gary Kitmacher as a workstation for operating the station's Canadarm2 robotic arm, maneuvering vehicles outside the station, and observing and supporting spacewalks. He likened the use as similar to that of the Shuttle Orbiter Aft Flight Deck. There were to have been two Cupolas, one on either end of the racetrack shape formed by the station modules and nodes. It was initially named the "windowed workstation", to distinguish it from other computer-based workstations inside of the station and from which the crew could operate the station's systems.

Once the idea was initially accepted, a number of people went to work. Human factors specialist Frances Mount began to develop the rationale and operational scenarios for the Cupola, and got considerable support from Chief Astronaut John Young and Shuttle Commander Gordon Fullerton. Charles Wheelwright, who had defined the specifications for every window on every prior United States crewed spacecraft, began to define the design specifications of the Cupola windows. Laurie Weaver, who had just started with NASA as a student intern, began to work on a series of different configurations for the Cupola. She started with Kitmacher's idea, based on the Shuttle Aft Flight Deck, in this case two Aft Flight Decks mounted back to back, placed atop a short cylinder. An inexpensive mock-up made of PVC tubes was built and tested underwater, where critical dimensions could be measured to ensure that two crew members in zero-g would have adequate access. Then she built a series of small cardboard models, looking at a variety of different alternative shapes. The different configurations and their positive and negative attributes were presented at a series of Crew Station Reviews over the next year in which participants rated each. The Cupola that evolved was octagonal in shape, with eight similar windows around the periphery, four quadrant windows overhead, and mounted on a cylinder. The module was designed to fully contain at least two crewmembers "floating" side by side in zero-g neutral body posture. About this time, Kitmacher and designer Jay Cory applied the term Cupola for the first time. Kitmacher wrote the requirements and the name into the Man-Systems Architectural Control Document and into the requests for proposals for Work Package 1 at MSFC and Work Package 2 at JSC. Later, Kitmacher went on to lead the Man-Systems group, leading the first lunar outpost and moonbase studies and the Cupola reappeared on several of his rover and module designs.

Because of confusion between the responsibilities of the two contracts, both Boeing, which won Work Package 1, and McDonnell Douglas, which won Work Package 2, bid to build the Cupola. The McDonnell Douglas design was basically the same as NASA's, but Boeing's was smaller — a hexagon, with a single large circular overhead window, and a much shorter cylinder. The Boeing design had been considered but previously discarded, because it was unable to accommodate two crew members completely, and would instead require the crew to dangle their legs and bodies in the Node to which the Cupola would be attached. This design was the one ultimately built.

=== Manufacturing ===
Components of the Cupola were initially fabricated in California, and the windows in New York in the late 1980s, but as budgets were cut, the Cupola was a favorite target. Several times it was fought back into the program only to be cut again as not technically required. More than once the responsibilities for fabrication were bartered to one international partner and then another in exchange for Shuttle launch services and resources that the United States would provide on board the station in orbit. The Cupola made the rounds to Brazil and then finally wound up with ESA and the Italians in 1998, who completed it in 2003. Even then, the launch of the Cupola was repeatedly delayed until it finally made it into orbit in February 2010. The delivery method also changed from the Cupola being mounted on a SpaceLab pallet accompanying Kibo's external facility to being mounted on the European built Tranquility module as it was delivered.

The original barter agreement had ESA building two cupola modules for the ISS. This was later amended to just one. The ESA-built Tranquility module and the Cupola together cost nearly $409 m.

With final design and assembly by the Italian contractor Alenia Spazio (now merged into Thales Alenia Space), it is nearly 3 metres in diameter and 1.5 metres tall. It has six side windows and a top window, all of which are equipped with shutters to protect them from damage by micrometeoroids and orbital debris. It features a thermal control system, audio, video and MIL-STD-1553 bus interfaces, as well as the connections needed for installing one of the two identical workstations that control the robotic manipulator Canadarm2.

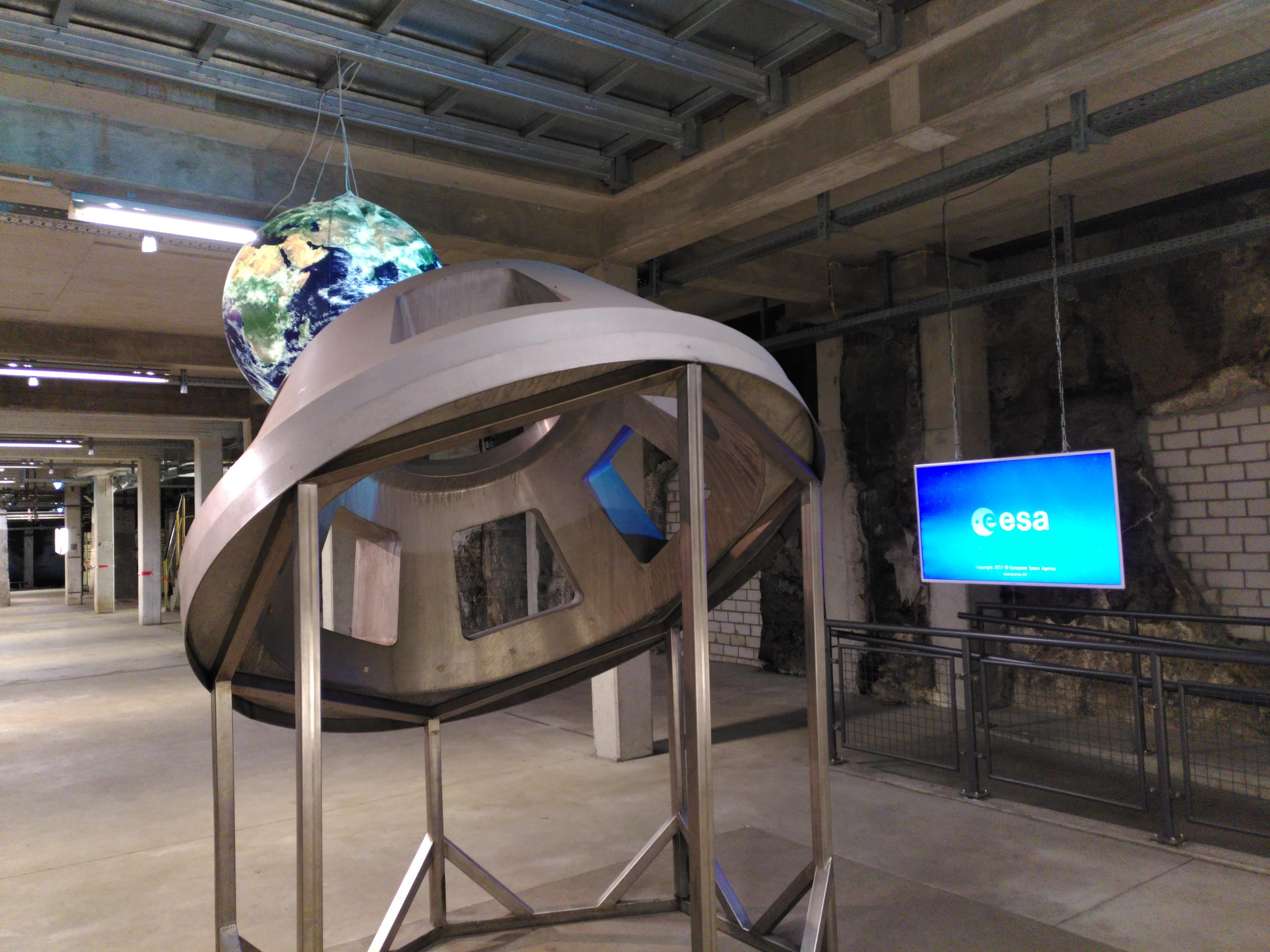
Prototype of the Cupola framework, exhibited in the Henrichshütte Museum, Hattingen

The Cupola's outer framework was built by the Vereinigte Schmiedewerke in Hattingen, Germany. It is made from forged aluminum, with an inner skeleton made from steel plates and bars welded together; which add strength against the pressure. Several companies including Alcoa and Tata Steel Europe were contracted for the manufacturing. A prototype is today exhibited in the Henrichshütte, LWL-Museen für Industriekultur.

Each window is composed of four separate layers ('panes'): An outer debris pane, two 25 mm pressure panes, and an inner scratch pane. Each pressure pane and debris pane is made from fused silica glass. The panes can be replaced in-orbit after an external pressure cover has been fitted.

The window shutters are manually controlled. Each window has a knob with a direct mechanical linkage to the outside shutter assembly. O-rings are used to prevent air leakage.

== Installation ==
Cupola was launched aboard Space Shuttle Endeavour on mission STS-130, on 8 February 2010. It was berthed to the forward port of the Tranquility module for launch, and was later transferred to the nadir-facing port of Tranquility by the Canadarm2, once Tranquility had been berthed to the Unity Module of the ISS. The installation of the Cupola, along with Tranquility, marked one of the last main components to be added to the International Space Station.

== Specifications ==
ESA specifications:

- Overall height: 1.5 m (4.9 ft)
- Maximum diameter: 2.95 m (9.68 ft)
- Launch mass: 1,805 kg (3,979 lb)
- On Orbit mass: 1,880 kg (4,145 lb)
- Dome construction: Forged Al 2219-T851 with steel reinforcement
- Skirt construction: Al 2219-T851
- Windows: Fused silica and borosilicate glass
- Shutters: DuPont Kevlar/3M Nextel sheets
- Electrical power: Node 120 V Interface
- Top window: 80 cm (31 in) diameter
- Thermal control: goldised Kapton multi-layer insulation blanket

== Gallery ==
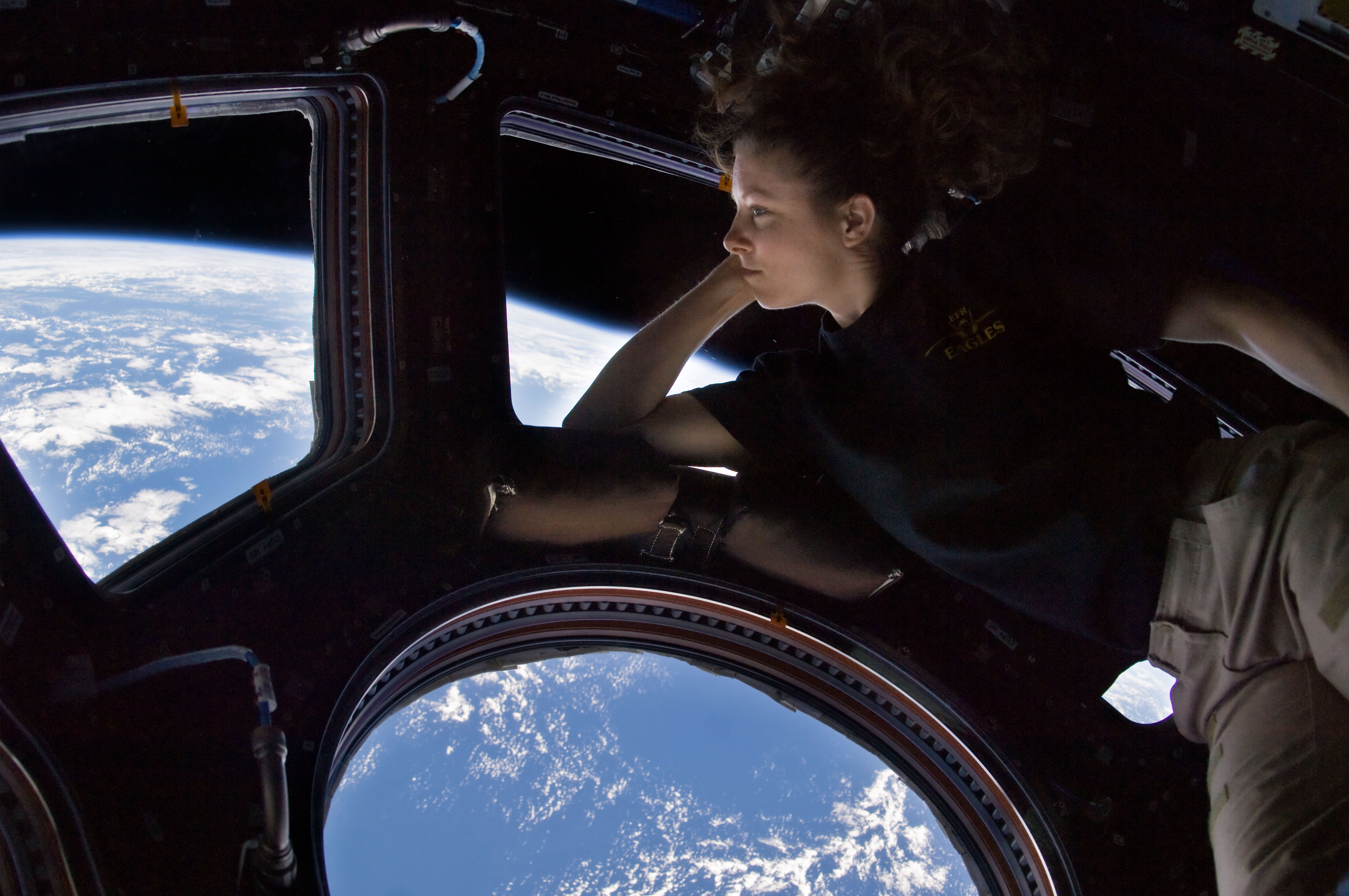
Tracy Caldwell Dyson in the Cupola module of the ISS observing Earth below

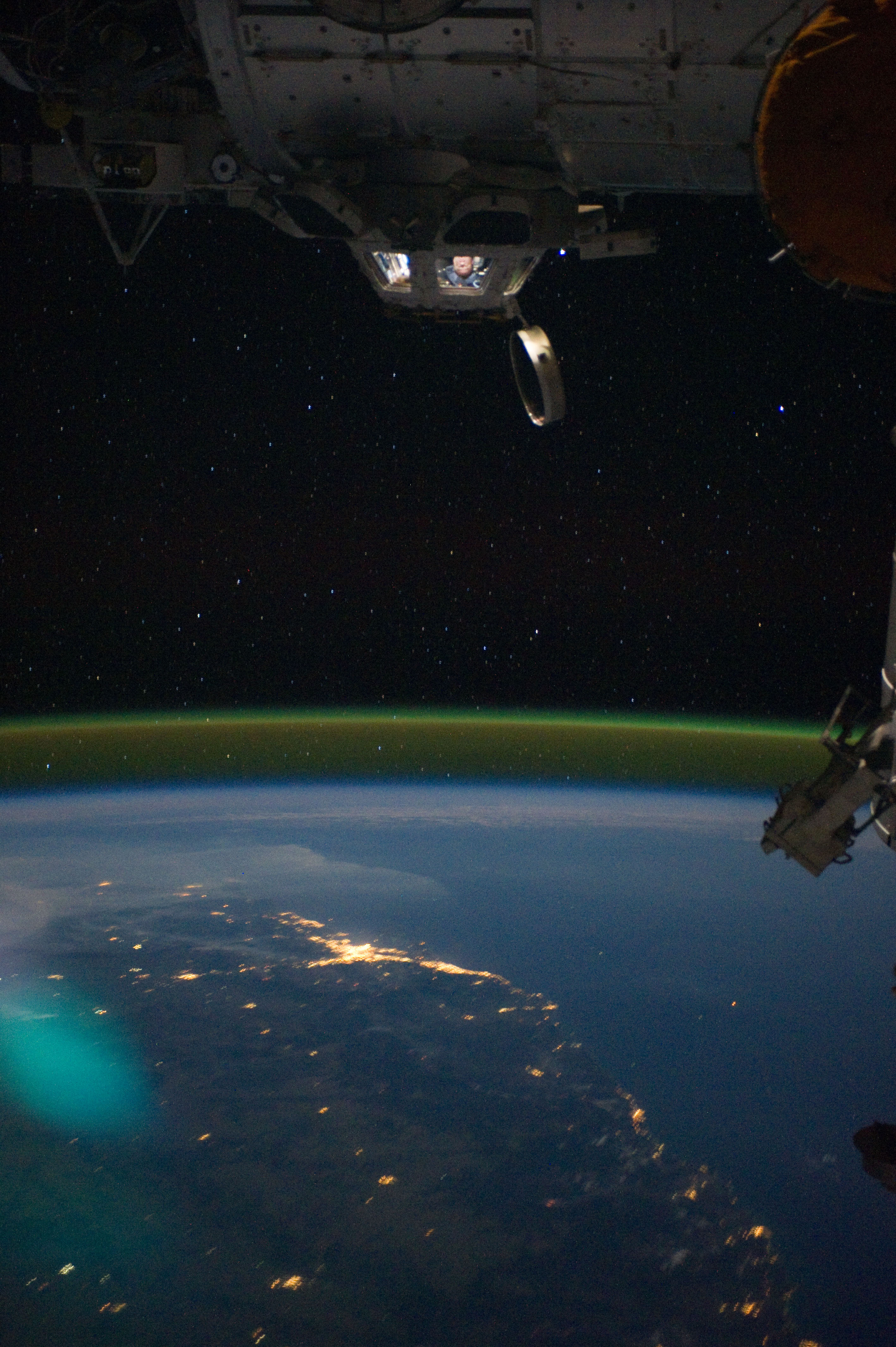
Cupola over the darkened Earth, in orbit in the vicinity of Brisbane, Australia

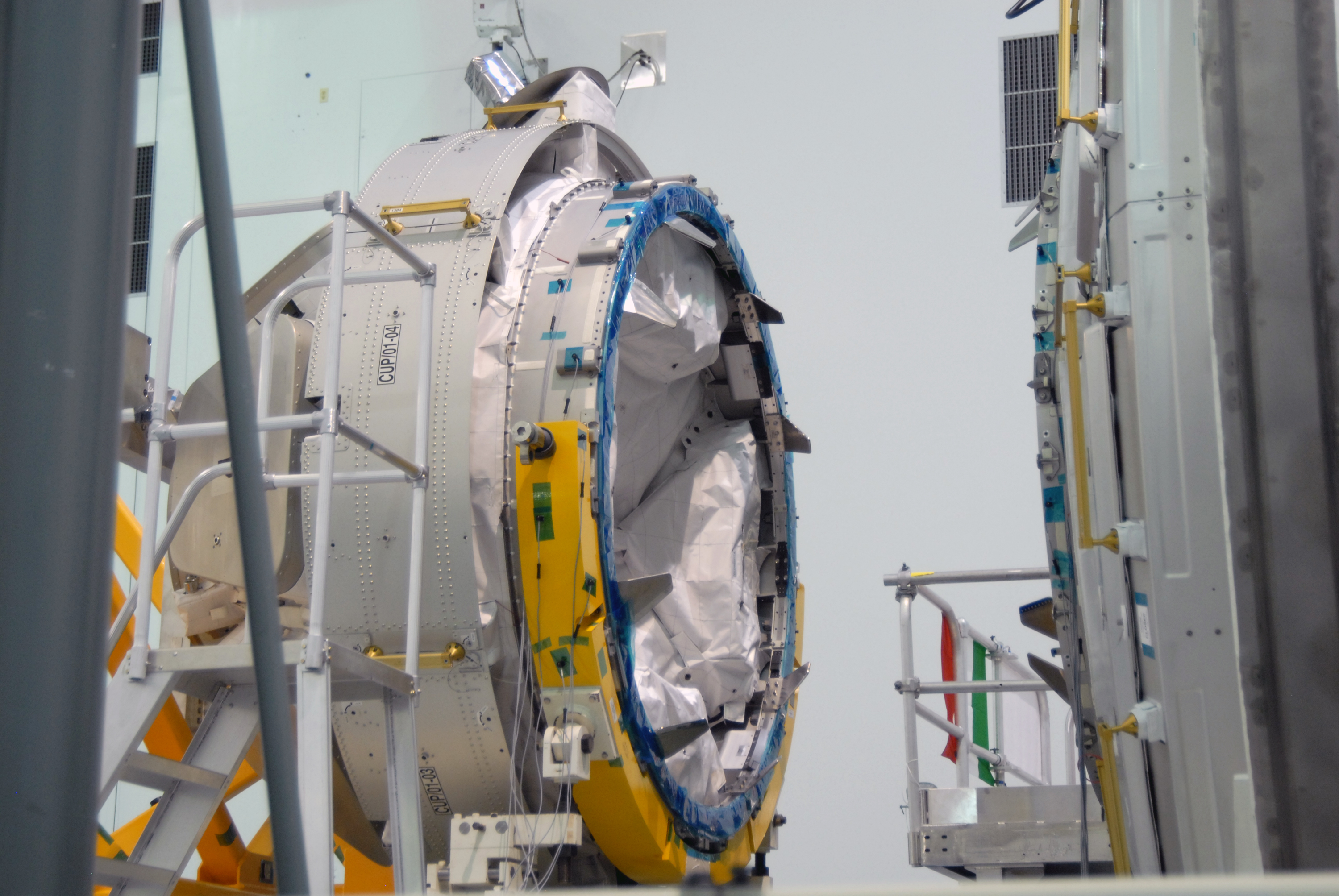
Cupola being aligned with the Tranquility module at the Space Station Processing Facility

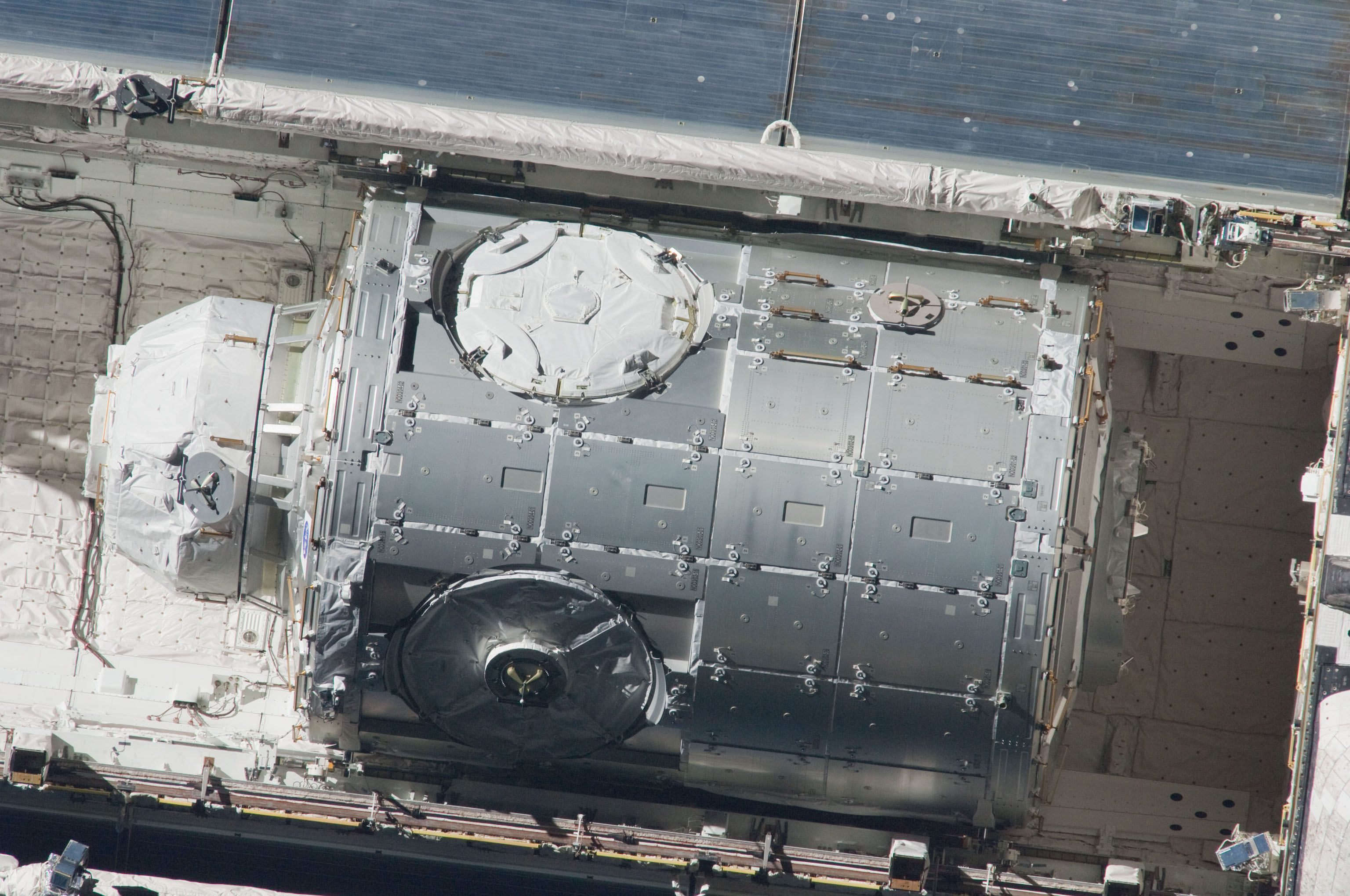
STS-130 ISS approach closeup of Tranquility and Cupola

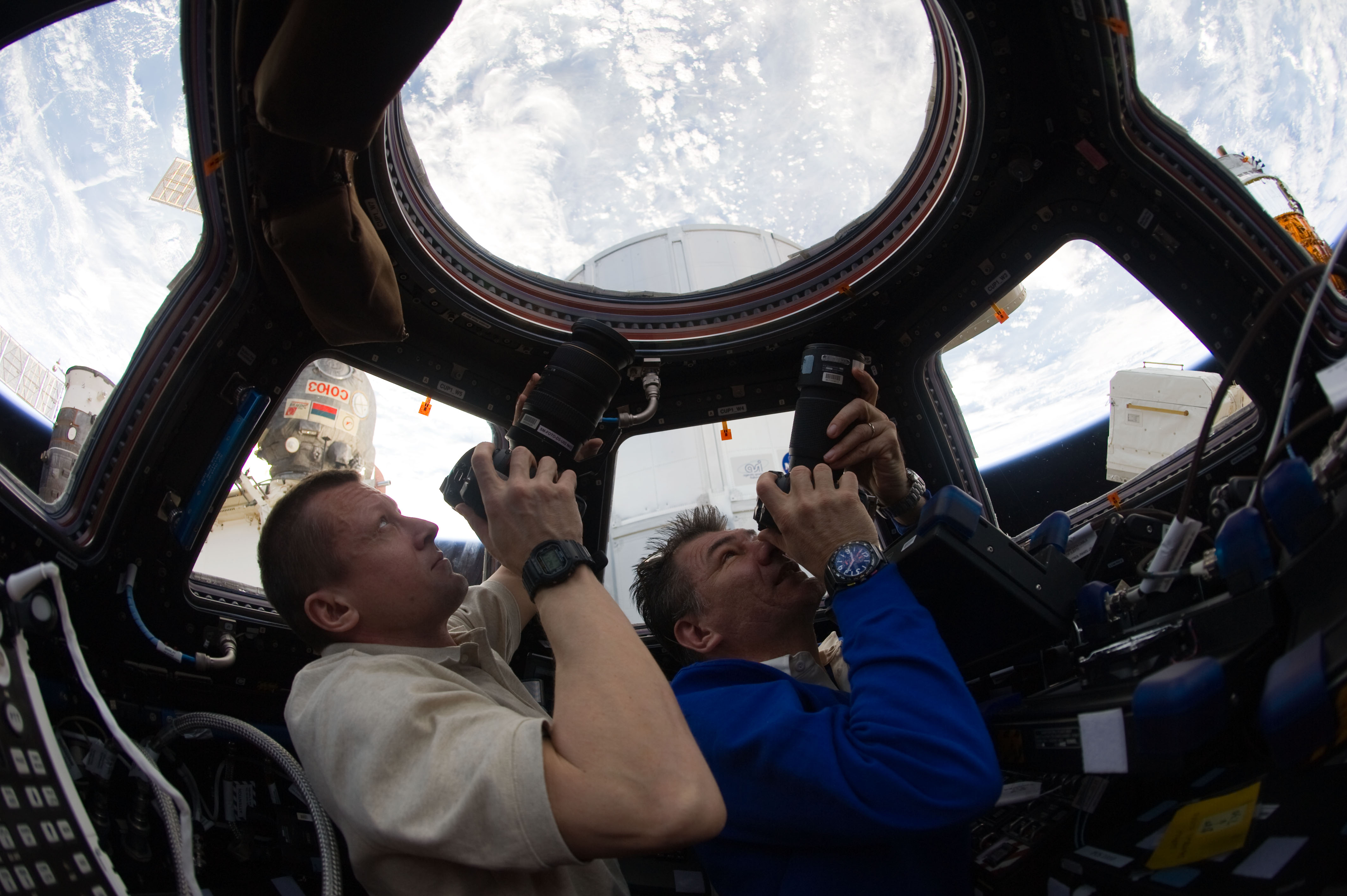
View of the space station from Cupola

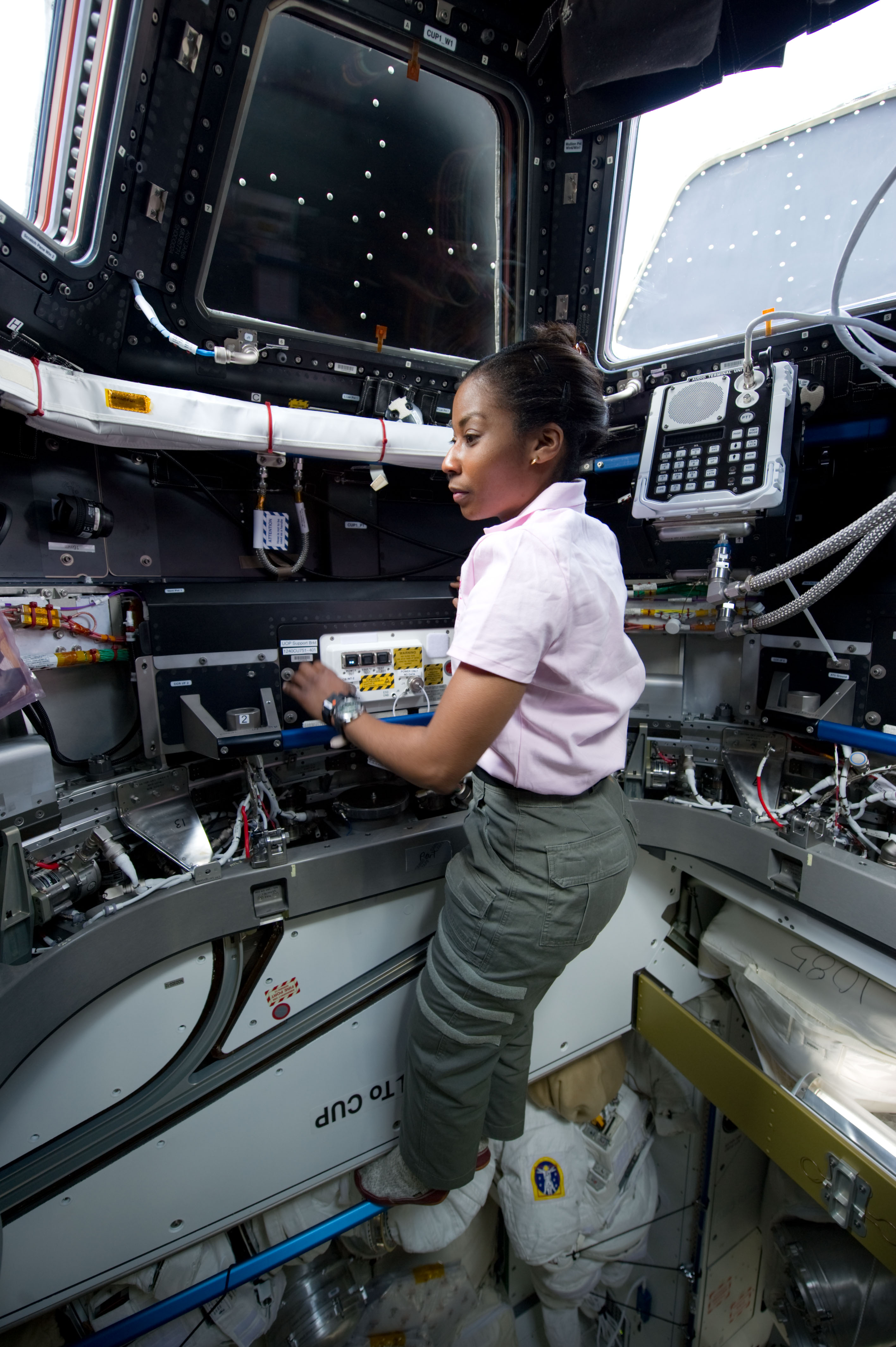
Stephanie Wilson relaxing to music in the Cupola during STS-131, April 2010

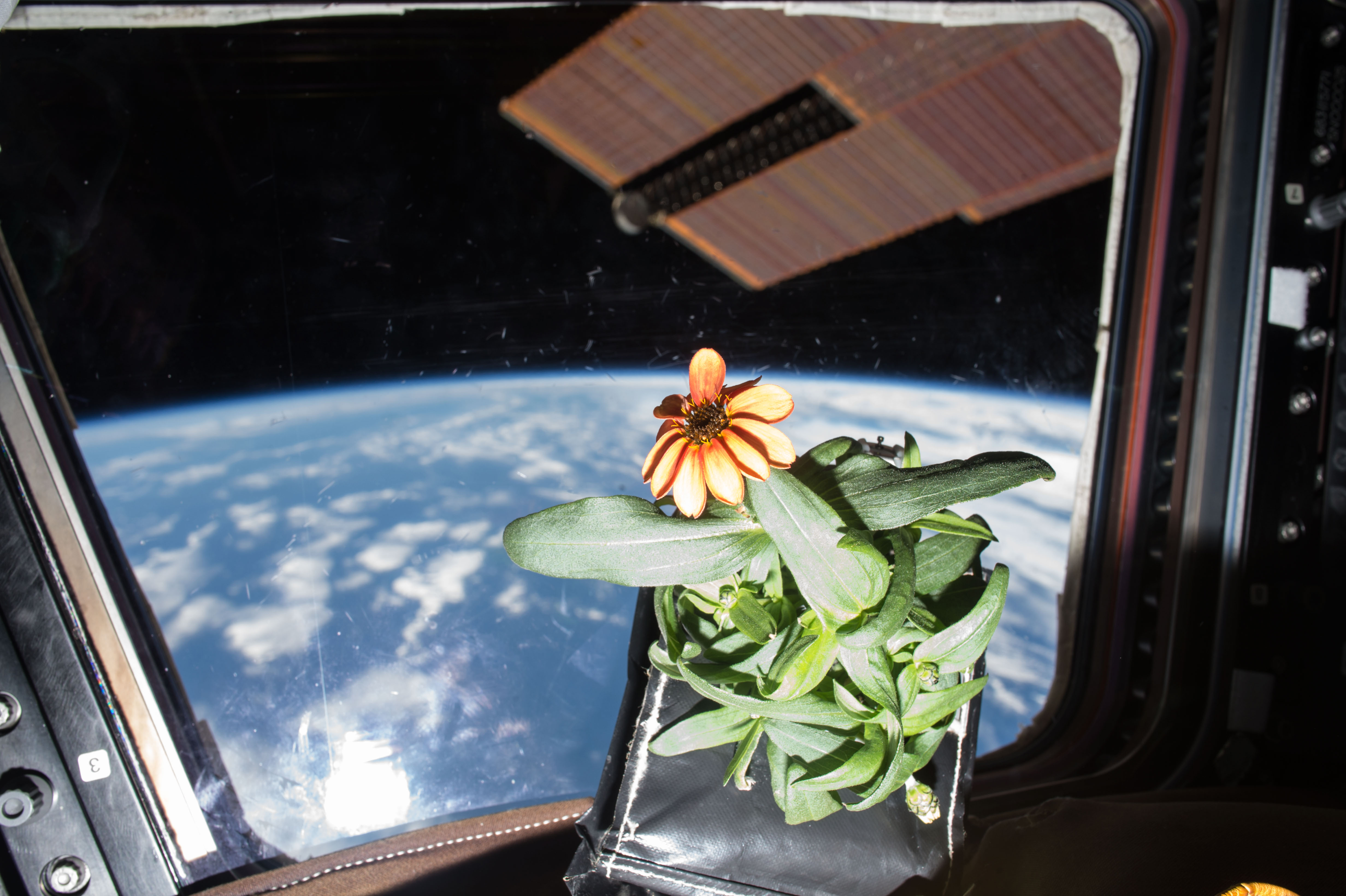
A Zinnia flower grown aboard the ISS in bloom in the Cupola, 17 January 2016

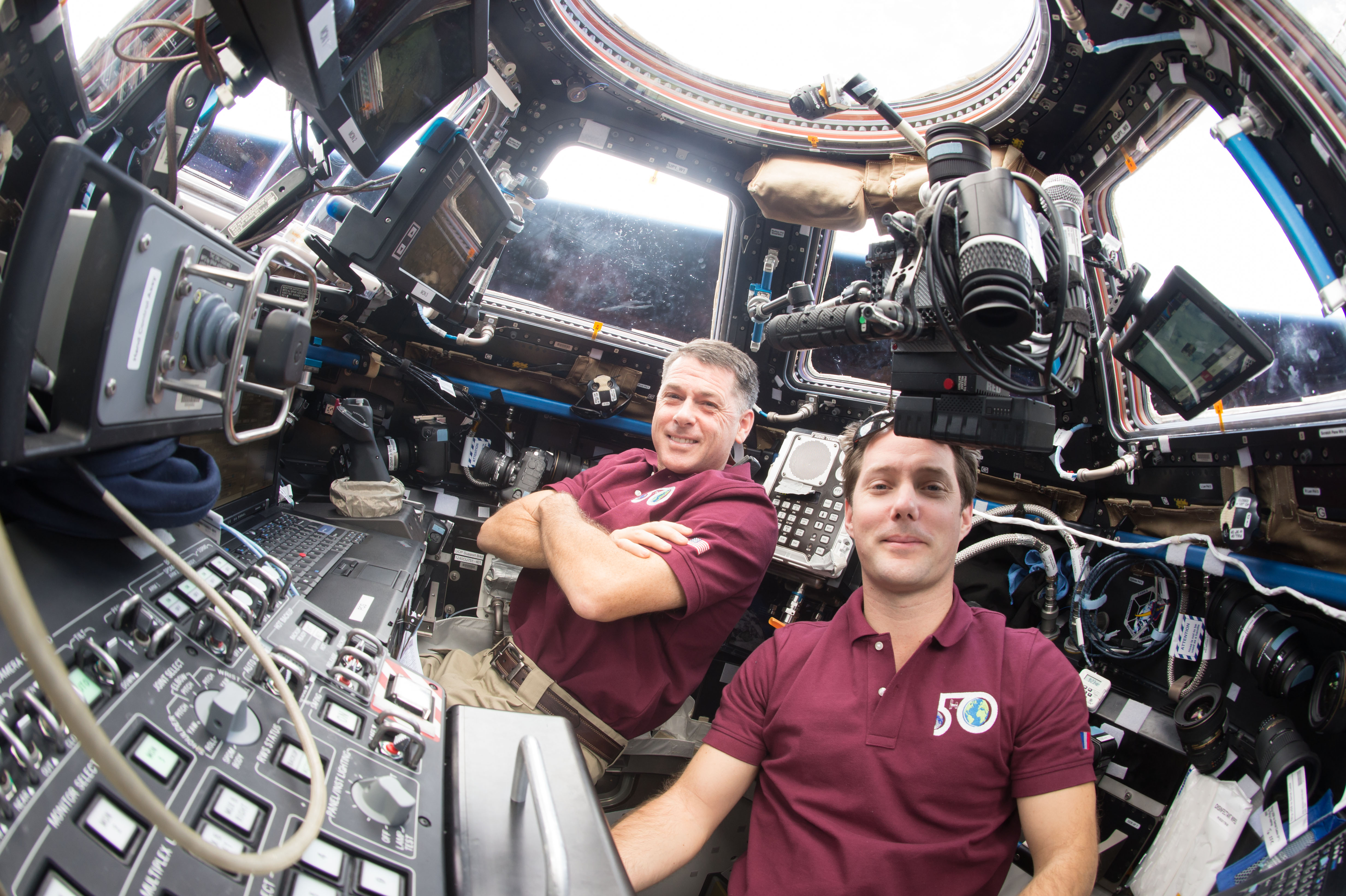
Kimbrough and Pesquet in the Cupola during Expedition 50, December 2016

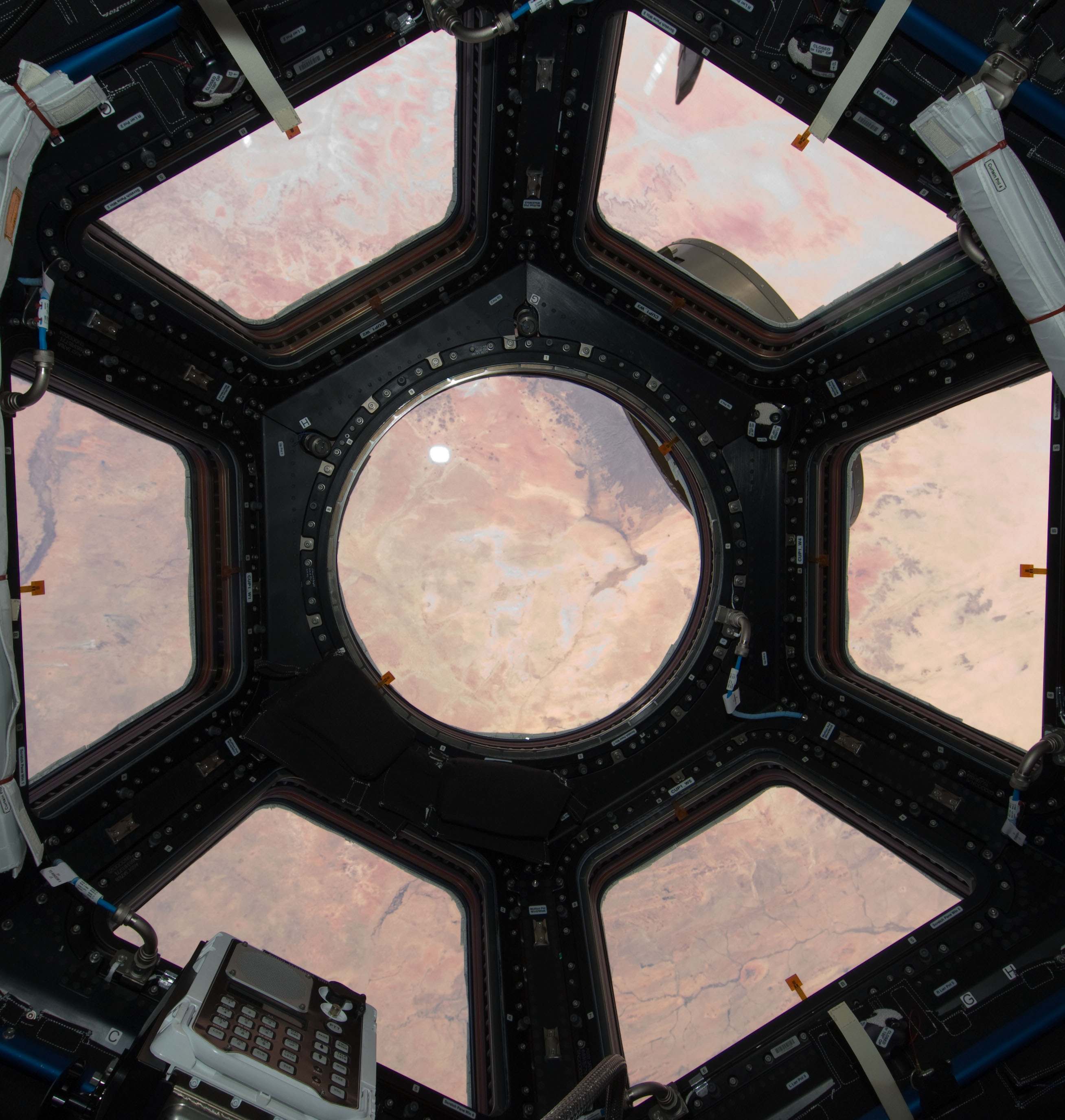
The Sahara viewed through the Cupola with its shutters open

== See also ==
- Spacecraft
- Space Station
- Scientific research on the ISS
