= Koas Krala (commune) =

Commune in Koas Krala District, Battambang Province, Cambodia

Coordinates: 12°46′N 103°16′E

Koas Krala ឃុំគាស់ក្រឡ
- Commune
- Interactive map of Koas Krala
- Country: Cambodia
- Province: Battambang Province
- District: Koas Krala District
- Villages: 9
- Time zone: UTC+07

Koas Krala (Khmer: ឃុំគាស់ក្រឡ) is a khum (commune) of Koas Krala District in Battambang Province in north-western Cambodia.

It is the seat of Koas Krala District.

== Villages ==
- Spean
- Voat
- Koas Krala
- Tuol Balangk
- Toul Ta Muem
- Thmei
- Prey Popel
- Beong Chhneah
- Damnak Kakaoh
