= Hospitality Awarding Body =

The Hospitality Awarding Body (HAB) was, until January 2010, the United Kingdom's specialist awarding body for hospitality and catering qualifications.

== History ==
In 2005 the company was acquired by the City and Guilds of London Institute, retaining its independent awarding body status until August 2009.

In January 2010 all active HAB candidates registered since 1 September 2006 were transferred onto City & Guilds awards.

== See also ==
- Confederation of Tourism and Hospitality
