= Fifty Shades Greener =

Irish environmental education company

- Industry: Education
- Founded: 2017
- Founder: Raquel Noboa
- Headquarters: Ireland
- Number of locations: 1
- Number of employees: 10-50
- Website: https://www.fiftyshadesgreener.ie/

Fifty Shades Greener is an Irish-based educational company for sustainable development involved in developing sustainability training and certification programmes for the hospitality sector, post-primary schools, industry and government. It was founded in 2017 by sustainable hospitality thought leader Raquel Noboa.

Its Green Manager training programme was created in collaboration with the Confederation of Tourism and Hospitality in the UK and became fully funded by the Education and Training Board for Irish Hospitality & Tourism businesses.

== Awards ==
In 2023 the company won the Princess Royal Training Award, whose president is Anne, Princess Royal. Fifty Shades Greener become the first Irish organisation that has received it at the time. It has since won the award again in March 2024.

EU Business News presented Fifty Shades Greener with the Irish Enterprise Award in 2022 and 2023.
