= Preah Phos =

Preah Phos ឃុំព្រះផុស
- Commune
- Location within Cambodia
- Coordinates: 12°39′08″N 103°16′26″E
- Country: Cambodia
- Province: Battambang Province
- District: Koas Krala District
- Villages: 9
- Time zone: UTC+07
- Geocode: 021304

Preah Phos is a khum (commune) of Koas Krala District in Battambang Province in north-western Cambodia.

== Villages ==
- Sach Hab
- Boeng Preah
- Prey Phdau
- Kab Prich
- Ta Khao
- Koy Veaeng
- Prey Chak
- Ta Nuot
- Boeng Preah Kralanh
