= Universal Space Interface Standard =

Spacecraft docking system

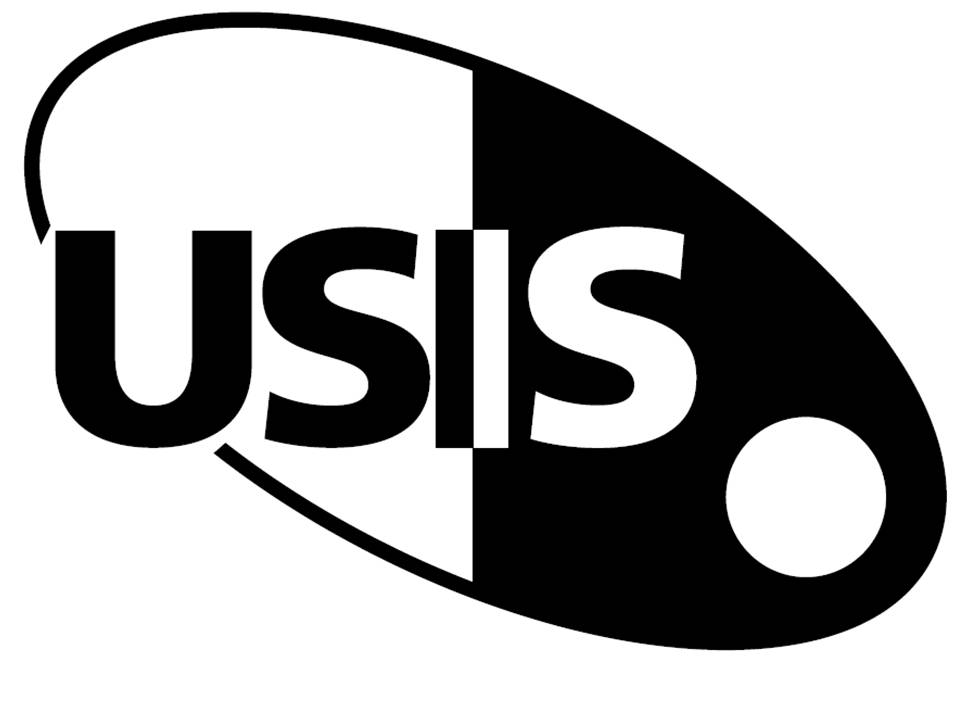
The Logo of the USIS Association.

Universal Space Interface Standard (USIS) is a physical interface between medium to large crewed or uncrewed spacecraft such as satellites, space stations and service tugs. It is designed to be suitable for adoption as an industry standard. Development is currently being undertaken by Mark Hempsell at Hempsell Astronautics Ltd. The rationale for the creation of an industry standard for spacecraft interfaces is that the number of applications for space vehicles is likely to increase greatly in the future (space tourism being a recent example). If each craft is utilising a common interface many new applications become feasible. This is somewhat analogous to the benefits which have been gained by widespread adoption of the USB connector in computing or even the standardisation of AC power plugs and sockets across some parts of the world.

== Design ==
The fundamental purpose of USIS has been stated to "be a standard connection that maximises the interconnectivity between independent systems in both the open space (orbital) and celestial body surface environments". To achieve this USIS must be suitable for a range of connection types, from ground made connections to hard docking between orbiting spacecraft. It must also be highly interconnectable (for example being fully androgynous, any two USISs being compatible), capable of bearing expected loads, capable of soft capture, and be able to sever the connection in a controlled manner. USIS also needs to be able to facilitate data, power and resource transfer when connected, and allow easy passage of personnel who are not necessarily trained astronauts in anticipation of the Space Tourism industry. Three potential designs have been proposed for the USIS concept, one from Reaction Engines, one from Qinetiq and one most recently from Hempsell Astronautics.
