= Tranquility (ISS module) =

American module of the International Space Station

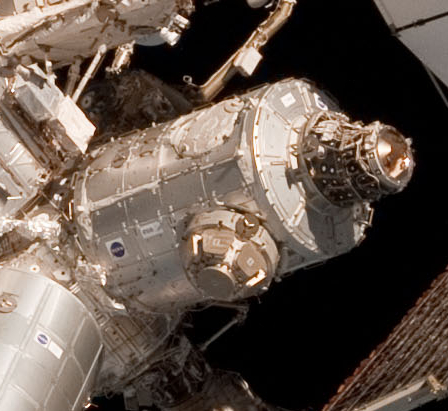
- Tranquility in 2011

Module statistics
- Part of: International Space Station
- Launch date: February 8, 2010, 09:14:08 UTC
- Launch vehicle: Space Shuttle Endeavour
- Berthed: February 12, 2010 (Unity port)
- Mass: 19,000 kg (42,000 lb)
- Length: 6.706 m (22.00 ft)
- Diameter: 4.48 m (14.7 ft)

Tranquility, also known as Node 3, is a module of the International Space Station (ISS). It contains environmental control systems, life support systems, a toilet, exercise equipment, and an observation cupola.

The European Space Agency (ESA) and the Italian Space Agency (ASI) had Tranquility manufactured by Thales Alenia Space. A ceremony on November 20, 2009, transferred ownership of the module to NASA. On February 8, 2010, NASA launched the module on the Space Shuttle's STS-130 mission.

== Design and manufacturing ==
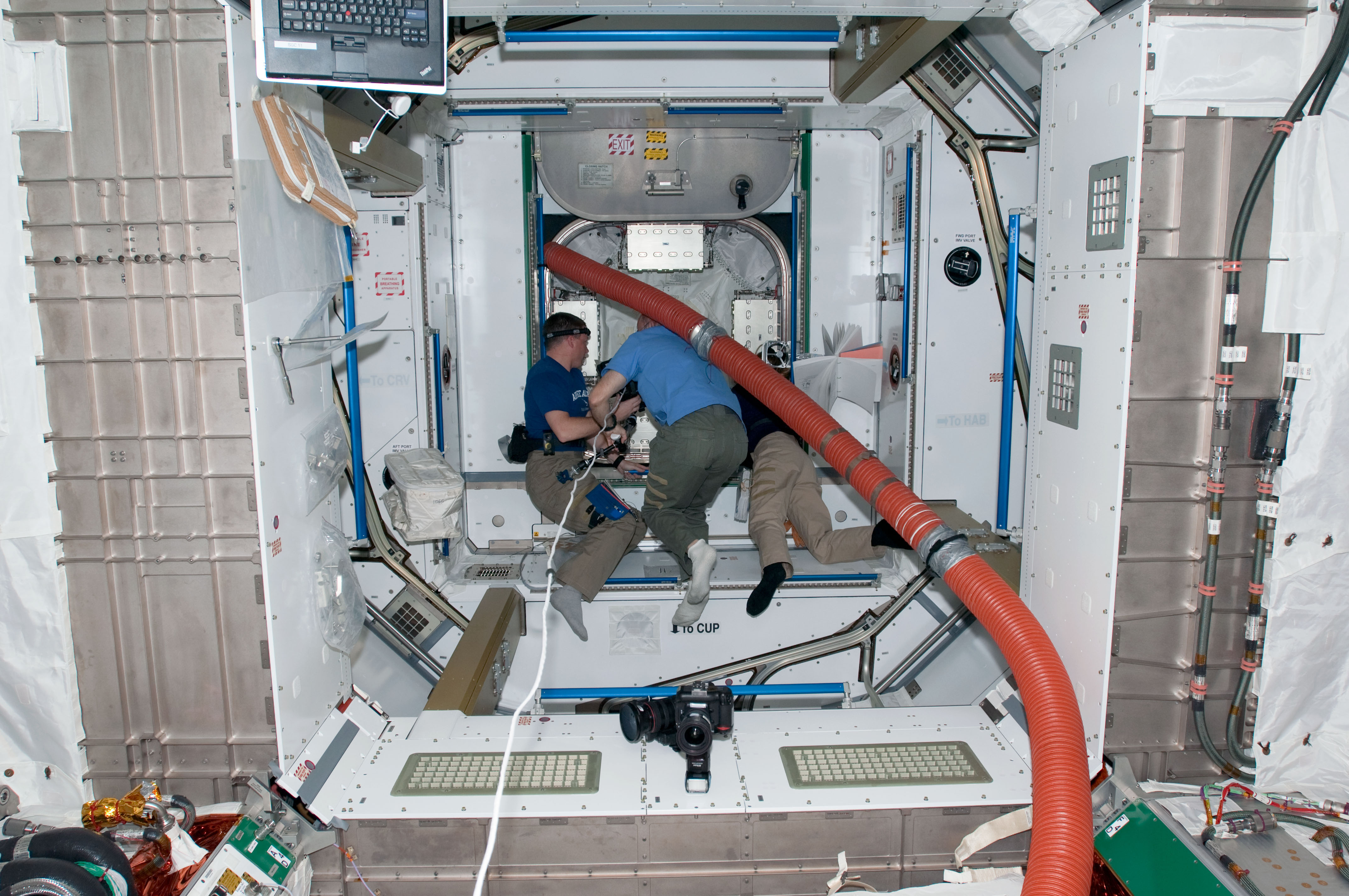
Interior of Tranquility

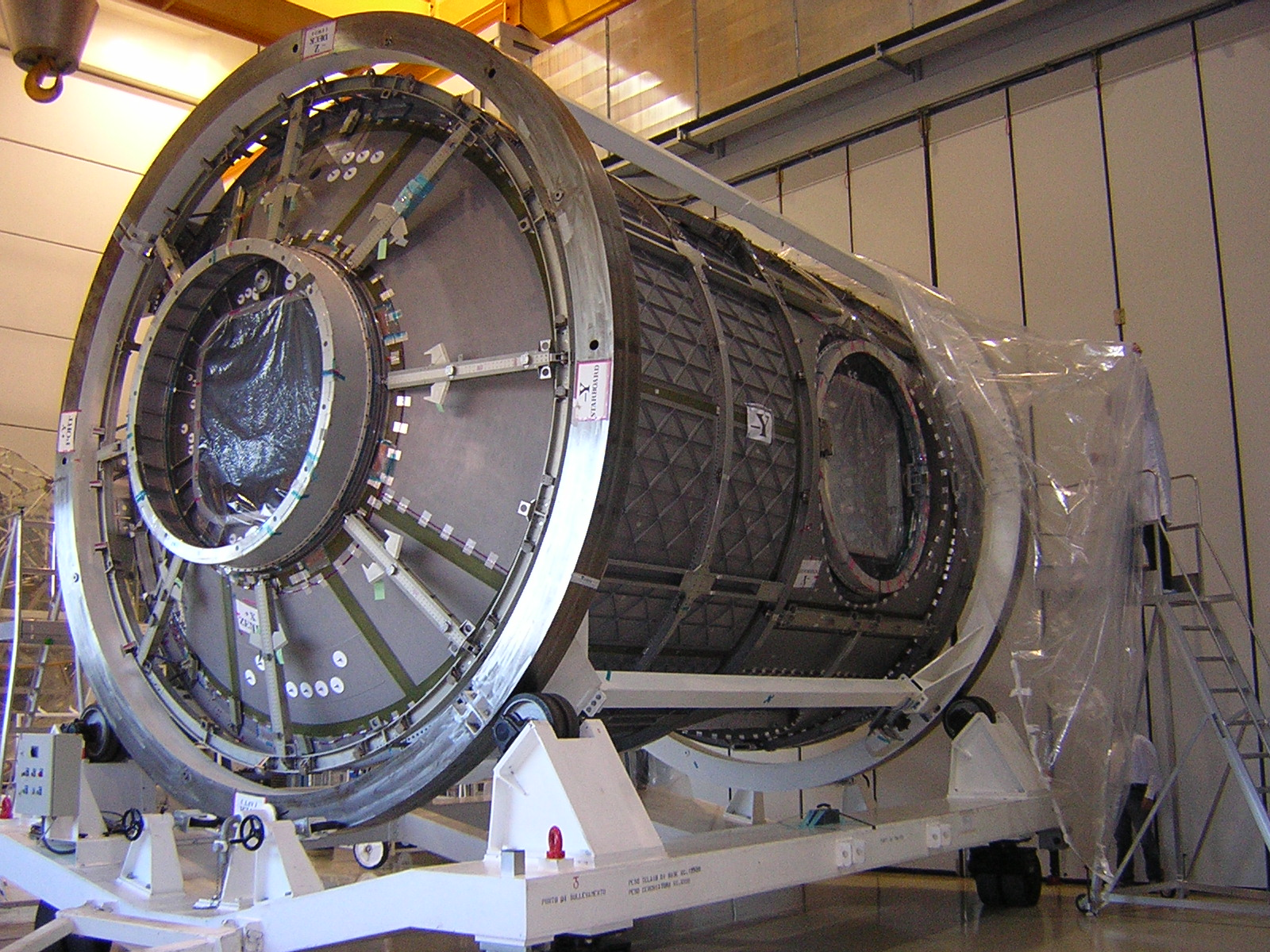
The Tranquility node during initial manufacturing

Tranquility was built within the ESA–NASA ISS bartering system. Under this arrangement, ESA agreed to provide NASA with the fully integrated Harmony and Tranquility node modules, along with additional equipment and parts, in exchange for the launch of ESA’s Columbus module and its initial payload aboard the Space Shuttle. This barter allowed ESA to secure launch services without a direct financial transaction, and enabling those funds to remain within ESA member states.

To build the nodes, ESA partnered with the Italian Space Agency and Thales Alenia Space, which manufactured them at its facility in Turin, Italy. The module’s pressure shell is constructed from 2219 aluminum, while its debris shield is made from hardened 6061 aluminum. The metal is heat-treated, giving the shield ballistic resistance comparable to stainless steel.

Tranquility provides six berthing locations with power, data and commanding, thermal and environmental control, and crew access for more attached habitable volumes or for crew transportation vehicles or stowage, or an appropriate combination of all of these. One of the berthing locations is used by the Cupola, which houses a Robotic Work Station inside it to assist in the assembly/maintenance of the ISS, and offers a window for Earth observations. Tranquility was launched with the Cupola attached to its port-facing Common Berthing Mechanism (CBM). After mating Tranquility with the port CBM of Unity, the Cupola was transferred to the nadir facing port of Tranquility where it will stay.

The module has three berthing ports that were not scheduled to be used prior to the end of the Space Shuttle program, although there is a Power Data Grapple Fixture reserved for the Special Purpose Dexterous Manipulator (Dextre), which is located on the zenith berthing location. In the current ISS configuration Tranquility is docked to the port berthing location of Unity. As such, the three unused berthing locations of Tranquility were disabled as the node's close proximity to other segments would prohibit the port's direct use for cargo spacecraft or using the docking module PMA-3, which was relocated from Harmony to the port berthing location of Tranquility for storage. At the time, the move of PMA-3 to the port location of Tranquility was required because NASA decided to leave the Multi-Purpose Logistics Module (MPLM) Leonardo permanently attached to the ISS, which will be located at the nadir side of Unity.

In 2001, NASA considered changing the design of the module. This idea for an extended or "stretched" module, was a result of the deferral/deletion of the Habitation Module. The stretched module would have held 16 racks, compared with the baseline capacity of eight racks. This modification was not funded and the plans were abandoned.

== Purpose ==
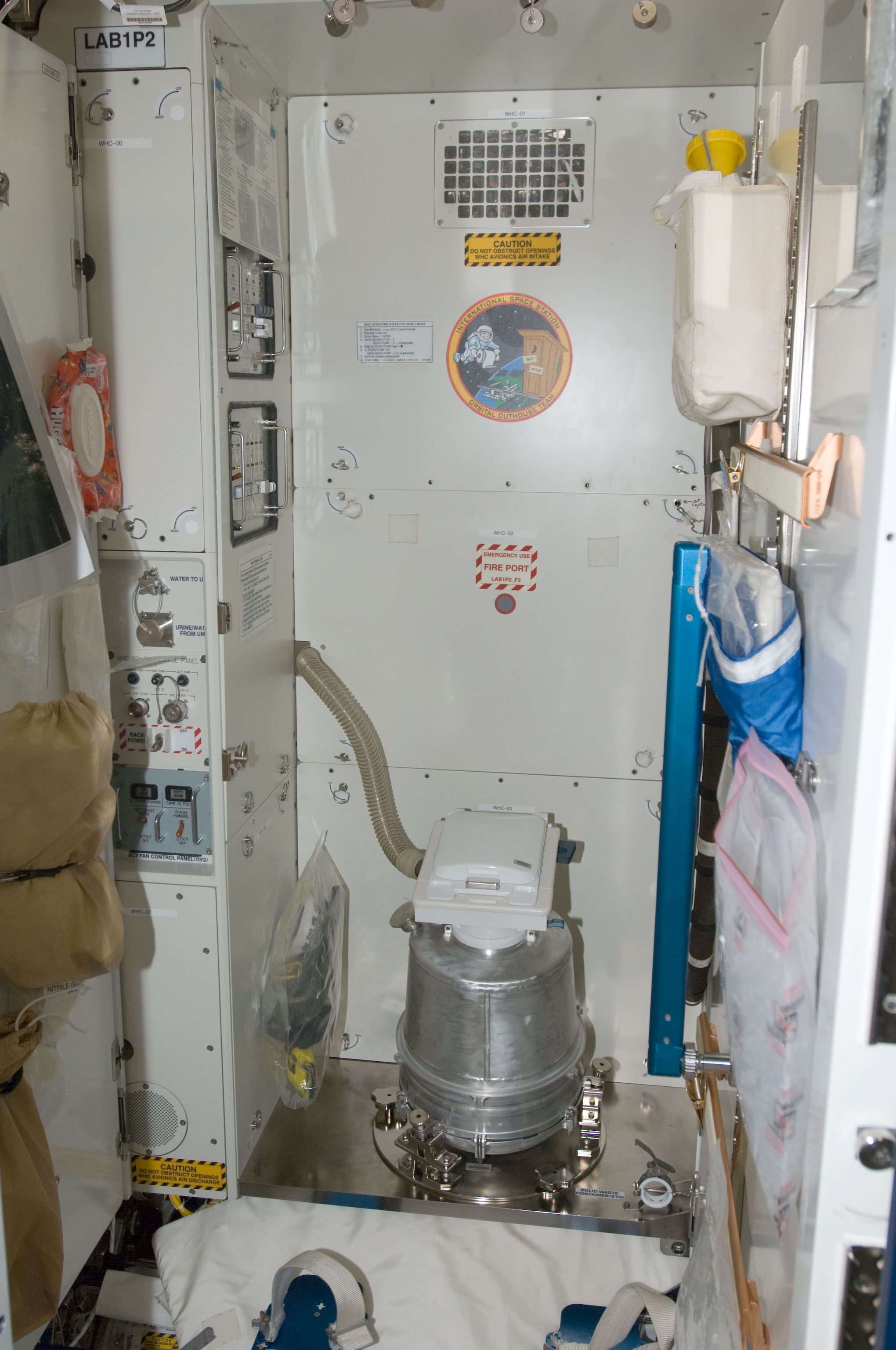
Space toilet inside Node 3, after relocation from the U.S. lab

The module's life-support system (ECLSS) recycles waste water for crew use and generates oxygen for the crew to breathe. In addition, Tranquility contains an atmosphere revitalization system to remove contaminants from the atmosphere and monitor/control the atmosphere constituents of the ISS. Tranquility also contains a Waste and Hygiene Compartment (toilet) for supporting the on-board crew. In 2020 a more advanced toilet, the Universal Waste Management System (UWMS), was installed alongside the Waste and Hygiene Compartment .

Tranquility is primarily used for exercise, storage, and robotics work in connection with Cupola.

== Launch, berthing, and connections to other station components ==
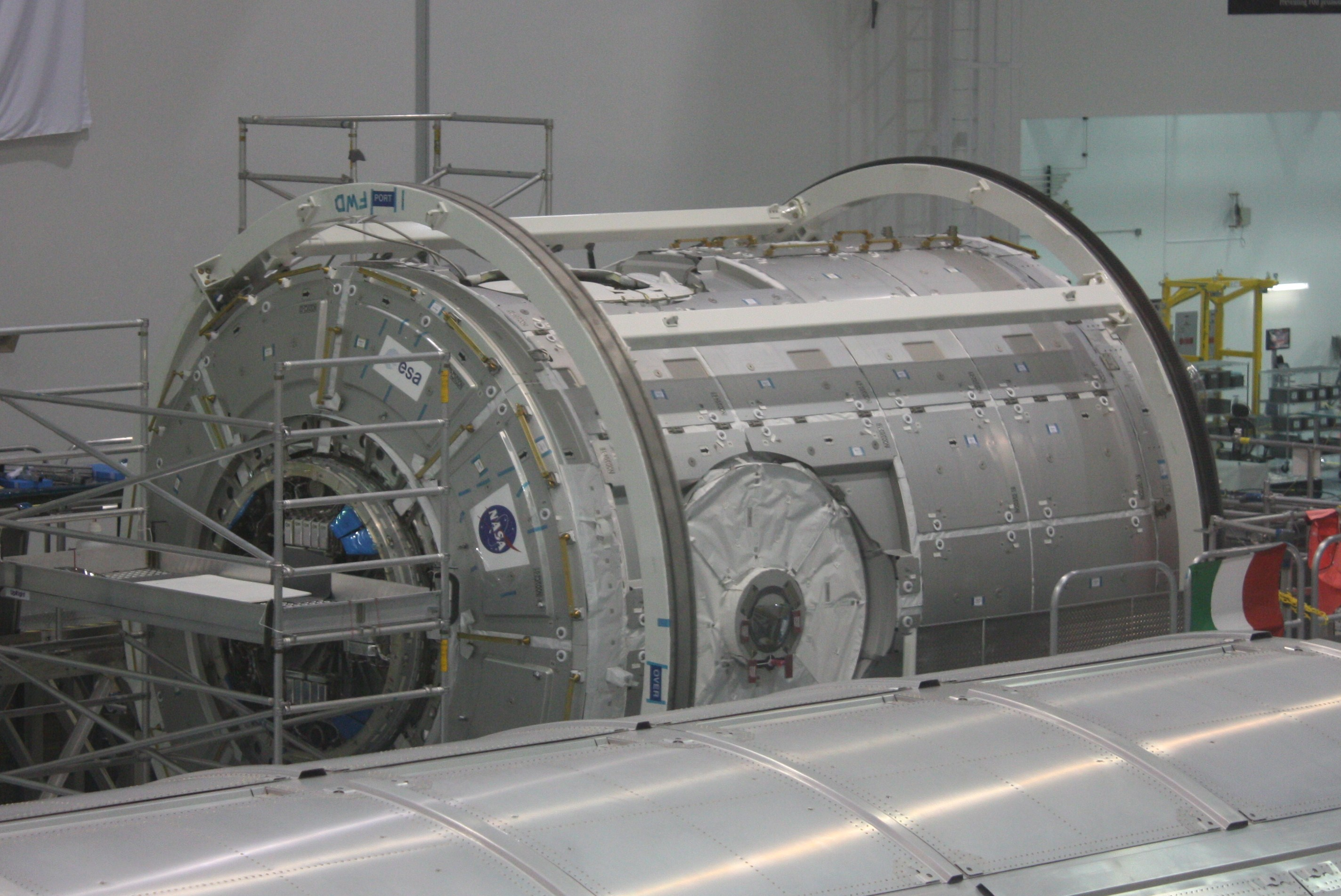
Tranquility in the SSPF

Tranquility was located in the clean room at the Thales Alenia Space, Turin site until 2009. It was shipped to Kennedy Space Center (KSC) on May 17, 2009, and arrived in Florida on May 20, 2009. It was officially welcomed to KSC on June 8, 2009.

Tranquility was launched on February 8, 2010, on board the STS-130 mission flown by Endeavour. It was berthed to the port side of Unity on February 12, 2010.

To accommodate SpaceX's Crew Dragon and Boeing Starliner Commercial Crew transports ISS crews began work in March 2015 to configure the station. As part of this work, Pressurized Mating Adapter-3 on the port side of Tranquility was moved to the zenith port of Harmony, above Pressurized Mating Adapter-2, to serve as a second docking port for these vehicles. In addition, on May 27, 2015, the Leonardo Permanent Multipurpose Module was moved from the nadir of Unity, to the forward port side of Tranquility to free up Unity as a port for berthing cargo spacecraft.

In April 2016, as part of the cargo payload from SpaceX CRS-8, the Bigelow Expandable Activity Module (BEAM) was attached to Tranquility on its aft port for a two-year duration.

Port

- PMA-3, 2010–2017
- Nanoracks Bishop Airlock, 2020–present

Starboard

- Unity, 2010–present

Forward

- Leonardo, 2015–present

Aft

- Bigelow Expandable Activity Module (BEAM), 2016–present

Nadir

- Cupola, 2010–present

== Naming contest ==
NASA held an online poll to name Node 3. Users were allowed to choose from among four provided names (Earthrise, Legacy, Serenity, and Venture), or to suggest their own. In early voting, fans of the science fiction TV series Firefly boosted "Serenity", the name of the show's spacecraft and spinoff film, to the top with 86%. On March 3, 2009, episode of The Colbert Report, host Stephen Colbert instructed his viewers to suggest "Colbert" as the name for Node 3 in the online poll.

Following Colbert's call to have the node named after him, several other groups attempted to influence the vote. For example, a number of different environmental groups promoted the name "Amazonia", after the Amazon rainforest. They argued that the name was more appropriate given that Node 3 will include the station's environmental control systems. Humorist Dave Barry urged readers of his blog to name the node "Buddy", which finished as the sixth most popular user-suggested name. Gaia Online asked its users to "Send Gaia to Space" by naming the node "Gaia", referring to the Greek goddess of the planet Earth, and "Gaia" finished third among the user-suggested names. Other popular user suggestions included "myYearbook", "SocialVibe", "Ubuntu", and the name of Scientology's galactic overlord: "Xenu".

"Serenity" was the top choice among the NASA-provided names, with 70% of the vote, but finished second overall, losing to "Colbert" by more than 40,000 votes. The naming contest rules, however, state that although the poll results will be taken into account, NASA has ultimate discretion in choosing an appropriate name for the node. On April 6, 2009, Stephen Colbert, in jest, threatened a lawsuit if the node was not named after him. In addition, United States Congressman Chaka Fattah stated that he believes that paying attention to democracy and voting results should not be limited to earthbound organizations so he planned to use congressional power to force NASA to honor the winning Colbert write-in votes.

On April 14, 2009, astronaut Sunita Williams appeared on The Colbert Report, and announced the name of the node would be Tranquility. The name was chosen in honor of the 40th Anniversary of the first lunar landing of Apollo 11 on the Sea of Tranquility. However, the treadmill the astronauts use for exercise has been named "C.O.L.B.E.R.T." for "Combined Operational Load Bearing External Resistance Treadmill" and is located in Tranquility. Colbert was thrilled and happily accepted this offer. The treadmill traveled to space aboard Space Shuttle mission STS-128 on August 28, 2009, for eventual installation in the Tranquility node during STS-130.

== Image gallery ==
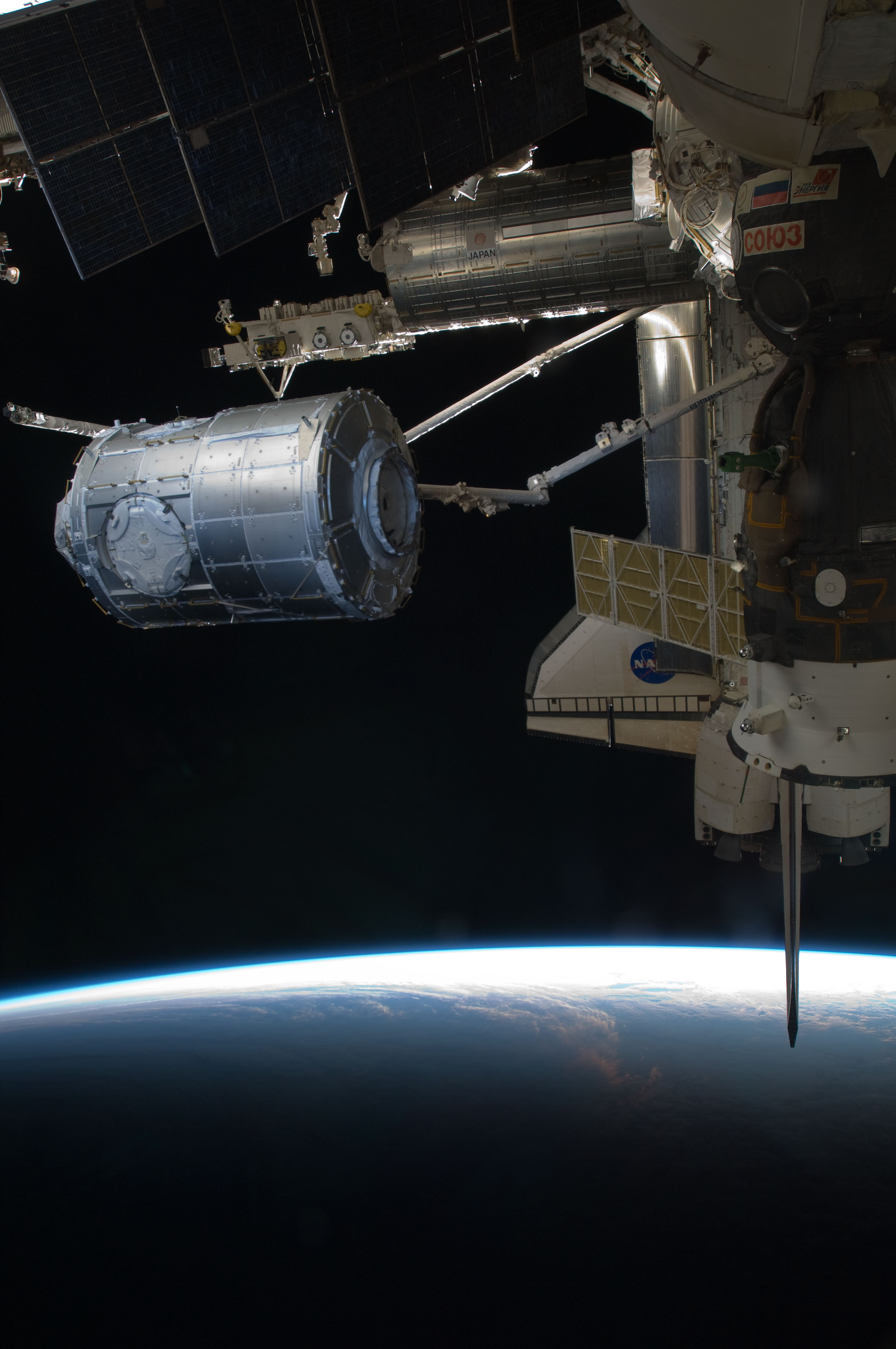
Tranquility during its move from Endeavour to the install position on the Unity node

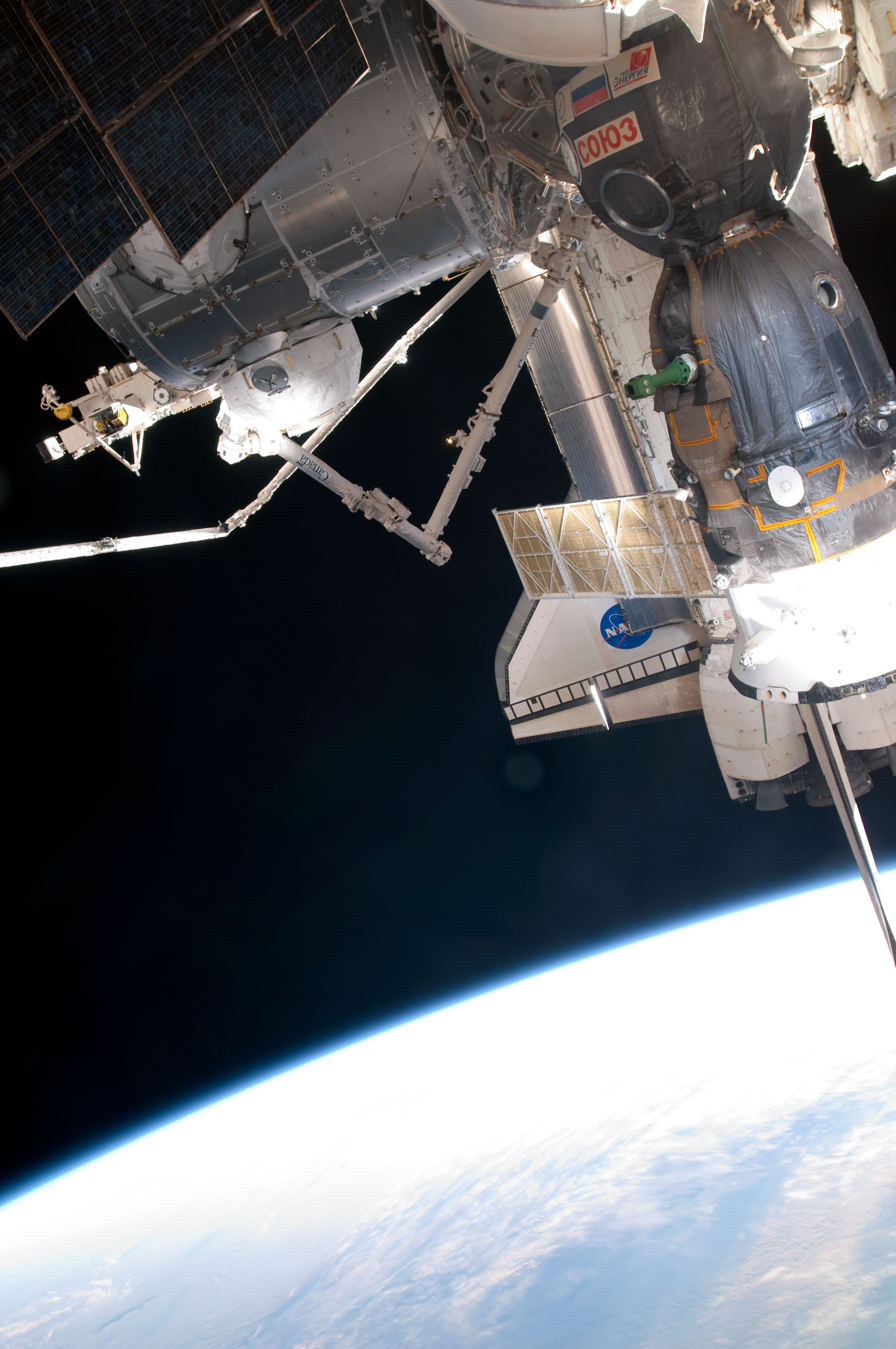
Cupola just after installation at Earth-facing port on Tranquility

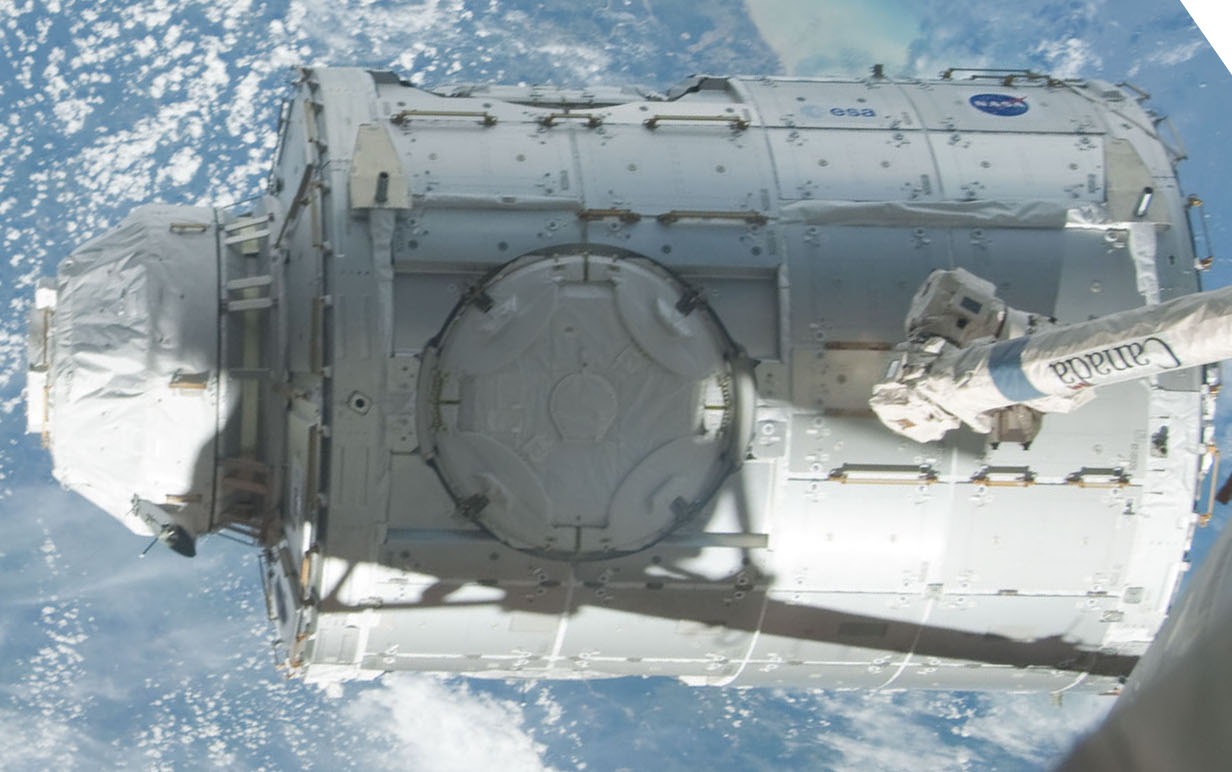
Tranquility with Cupola attached

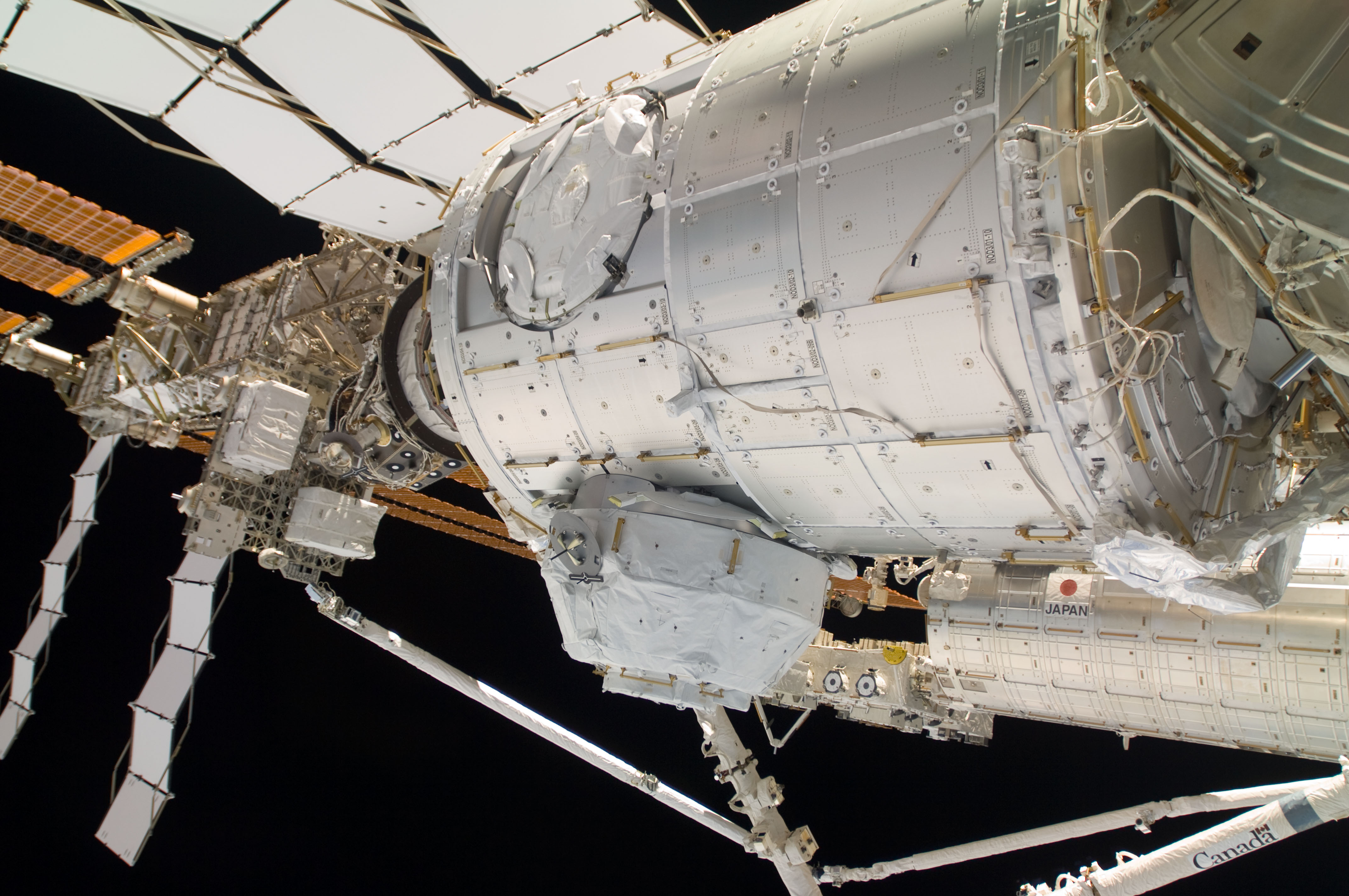
PMA-3 is moved to the end of Tranquility. Cupola is seen on top with its protective launch cover still attached.

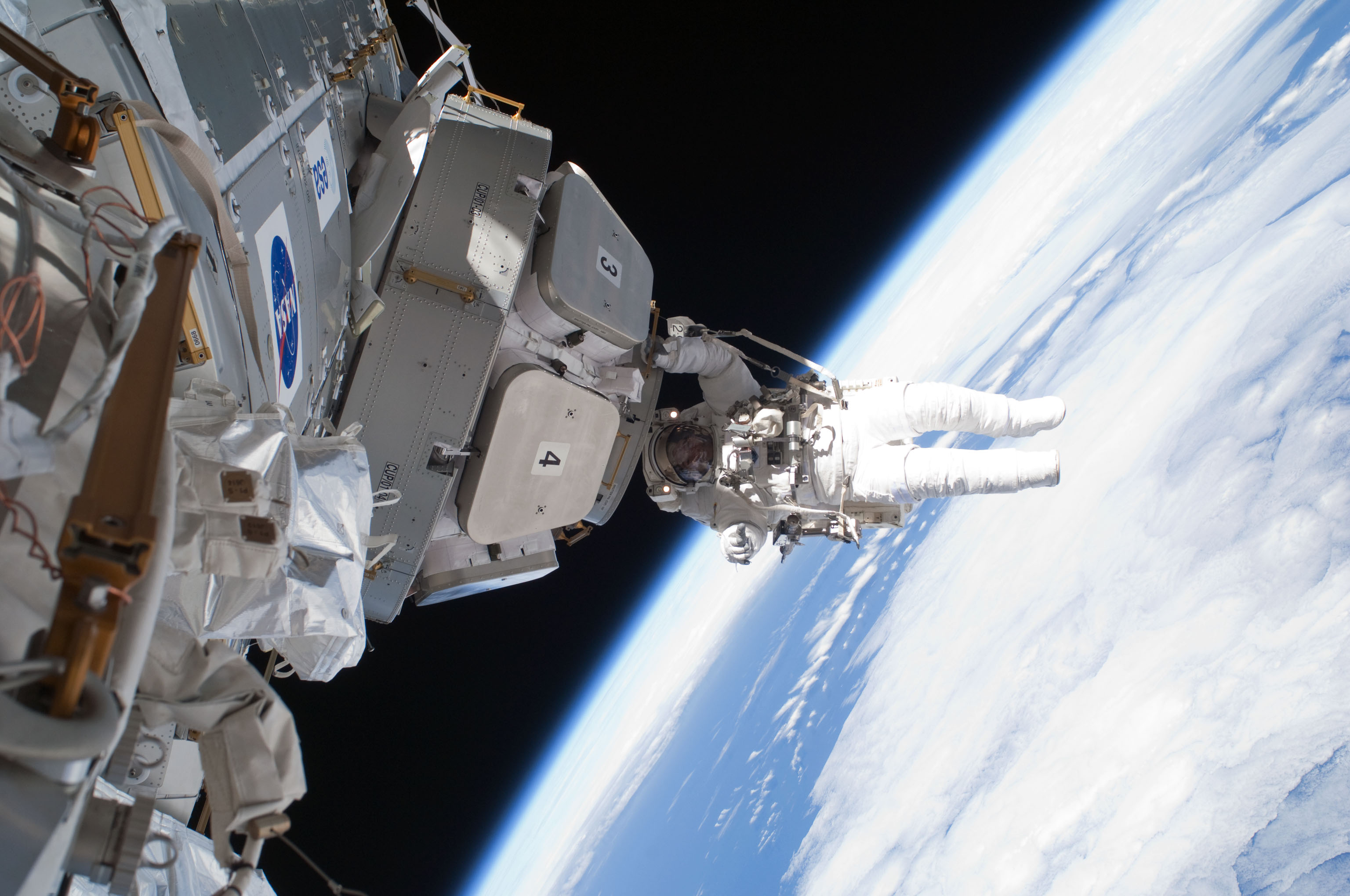
Astronaut Nicholas Patrick hanging on to Cupola after insulation has been removed

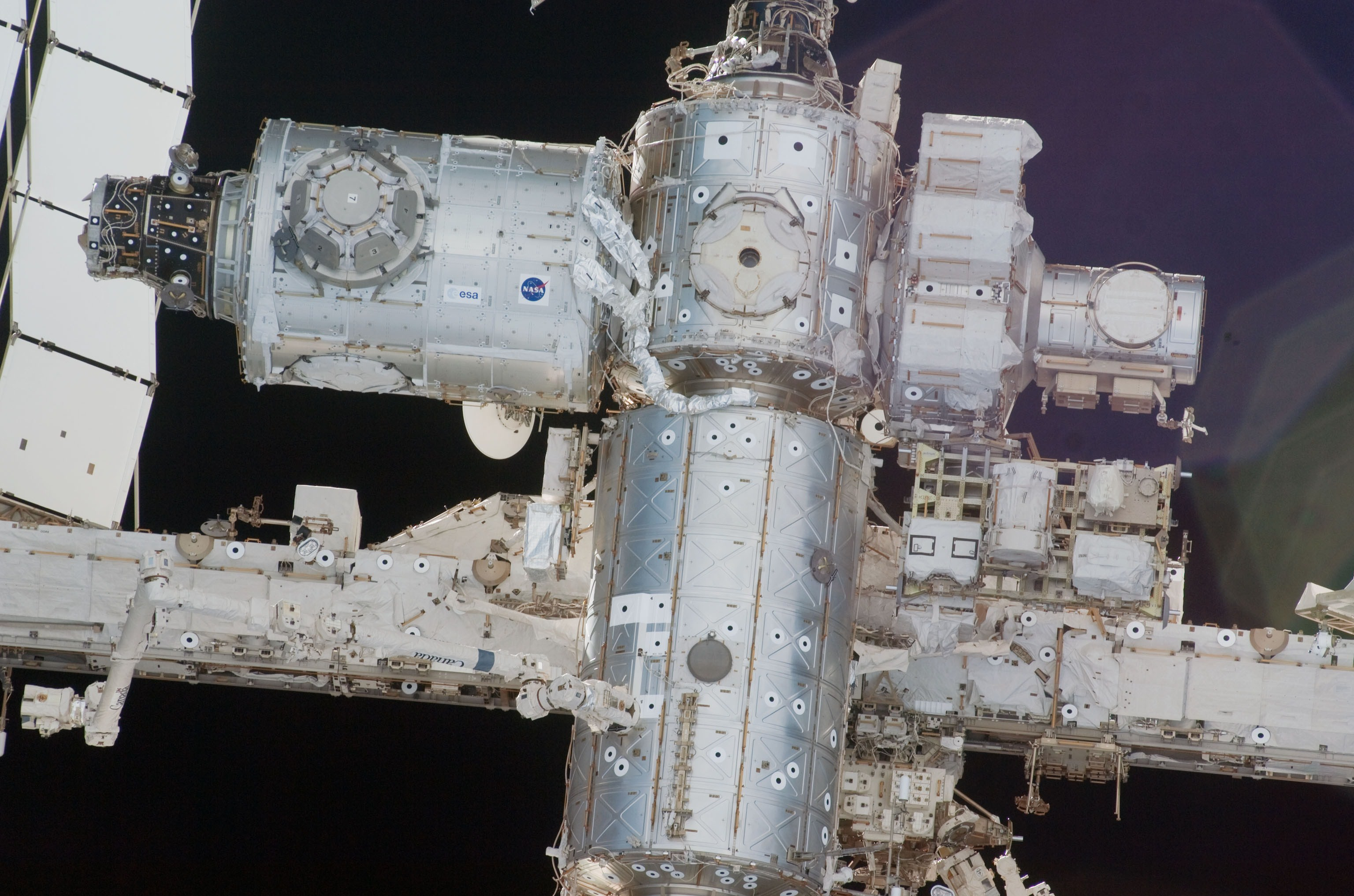
Tranquility seen top left corner with Cupola and PMA-3

== See also ==
- Tranquility Base, namesake
