= Hab, Cambodia =

Commune in Koas Krala District, Battambang Province, Cambodia

Hab ឃុំហប់
- Commune
- Location within Cambodia
- Coordinates: 12°47′39″N 103°18′23″E
- Country: Cambodia
- Province: Battambang Province
- District: Koas Krala District
- Villages: 7
- Time zone: UTC+07
- Geocode: 021303

Hab (Khmer: ឃុំហប់) is a khum (commune) of Koas Krala District in Battambang Province in north-western Cambodia.

== Villages ==
- Hab
- Chambak
- Sambour
- Sameakki
- Trapeang Dang Tuek
- Kouk Trom
- Slaeng Chuor
