= Habitation Extension Modules =

Proposed British-built ISS modules

The Habitation Extension Modules (HEM) refers to proposed British-built modules designed to connect to Node 3 (Tranquility) of the International Space Station. They were conceived by a consortium of engineers and scientists led by Mark Hempsell, aeronautical engineer at the University of Bristol.

== History ==
The proposal has no formal support of the British government, as of January 2008, but if funded the modules were intended to be launched sometime in 2011.

The purpose of the modules is to provide a formal British presence in the ISS project, which to date has been nonexistent (Britain is not an independent ISS partner, and does not contribute through ESA). The HEM would be British-built modules designed to connect to Node 3 (Tranquility) of the International Space Station. They were conceived by a consortium of engineers and scientists led by Mark Hempsell, aeronautical engineer at the University of Bristol. The two modules will provide 100 cubic metres (3,500 cu ft) of living space with enhanced radiation protection, and allow the astronaut crews an enhanced amount of social and personal living space on board the platform.

The two modules are named HEM 'C' and HEM 'D'. HEM 'C' is designed to contain a wardroom arrangement of a viewscreen with a central table for group meetings and conferences with Earth. HEM 'D' would contain improved sleeping and personal work arrangements. HEM 'D' features six separate compartments which each contain a small sleeping area (0.9 by 2 metres or 3.0 by 6.6 feet), a foldaway desk, and a small amount of space for personal effects and other items. From a personal privacy point of view, it affords each crew member an area where they can close a door and be entirely private from the rest of the crew, where they can dress and undress, or perform other acts of a personal nature.

The estimated cost of the modules is £600 million, spread out over the course of 6 or 7 years and takes into account the costs of construction, launching and maintenance.

== See also ==
- Proposed modules for the ISS
- PMM (basic "can")
