= Koas Krala district =

Koh Kralor គាស់ក្រឡ
- District (srok)
- Interactive map of Koh Kralor
- Coordinates: 12°45′N 103°16′E
- Country: Cambodia
- Province: Battambang
- Communes: 6
- Time zone: UTC+7 (ICT)

Koh Kralor (Khmer: គាស់ក្រឡ) is a district (srok) of Battambang province, in north-western Cambodia.

== Administration ==
The district is subdivided into 6 communes (khum).

=== Communes and villages ===
| Khum (commune) | Phum (villages) |
|---|---|
| Thipakdei | Ra, Samraong, Chhay Ballangk, Cheung Tinh, Ta Thok, Kantuot, Kouk Poun, Boeng Snao, Tuol Mtes, Koun Prum, Boeng Reang |
| Koh Kralor | Koh Kralor, Spean, Muk Voat, Tuol Ballangk, Toul Ta Muem, Thmei, Prey Popel, Beong Chhneah, Damnak Kakaoh |
| Hab | Hab, Chambak, Sambour, Sameakki, Trapeang Dang Tuek, Kouk Trom, Slaeng Chuor |
| Preah Phos | Sach Hab, Boeng Preah, Prey Phdau, Kab Prich, Ta Khao, Koy Veaeng, Prey Chak, Ta Nuot, Boeng Preah Kralanh |
| Doun Ba | Ba Srae, Doun Ba, Prey Phnhoas, Tuol Lieb, Kouk Roka, Khlaeng Kong, Khvaeng, Prey Paen |
| Chhnal Moan | Krang Svat, Banteay Char, Prey Sen, Prey Totueng, Samraong, Ruessei Preah, Chhnal Moan |
