= Qualification awarding bodies in the United Kingdom =

Agencies recognised by one of the government-appointed regulatory bodies

In the United Kingdom, an awarding body is an examination board which sets examinations and awards qualifications, such as GCSEs and A-levels. Additionally, these awarding bodies provide professional awards in the form of tertiary level certificates, diplomas and advanced diplomas. As education is a devolved matter, regulation of awarding bodies is carried out separately by each nation of the United Kingdom.

== Functions of awarding bodies ==
In the UK, in order for a qualification to be recognised as part of one of the UK qualifications frameworks, it must be awarded by an awarding body that is recognised by one of the government-appointed regulatory bodies or (for higher education qualifications) be awarded by a body with degree awarding powers. The regulatory bodies are Ofqual in England, the Council for the Curriculum, Examinations & Assessment in Northern Ireland, the Qualifications Scotland in Scotland and Qualifications Wales in Wales. Higher education is separately regulated, by the Office for Students in England, the Department for the Economy in Northern Ireland, the Scottish Funding Council in Scotland and Medr in Wales.

There are over 200 regulated awarding organisations in England and Northern Ireland as of 2026. Some specialise in specific subjects. Others specialise in types of qualifications, such as ‘A’ levels, GCSEs and vocational competence or knowledge based qualifications. The five largest awarding bodies in England, with over 500,000 qualifications each in 2023/24, are:

- AQA
- Pearson Education
- Cambridge OCR
- WJEC
- City and Guilds Ltd

An awarding body does not always provide the courses that lead to a qualification. Often an awarding body will provide an approval process for independent training providers who, if they meet the criteria, are able to award qualifications that are accredited by that awarding body.

An RQF qualification from an awarding body is always clearly identified as being at one of 9 Levels. These begin with ‘Entry Level’ (which is further divided into three sub-levels) and then run from Level One through to Level Eight. These levels are common across the different frameworks in England, Wales and Northern Ireland, including the FHEQ (which starts at level 4), allowing the difficulty of a qualification to be equated, e.g. level 6 is at the same level of difficulty as a bachelor's degree and level 8 is at the same level of difficulty as a doctoral degree. The levels used in Scotland are different from those in the rest of the UK, but are still common across SQA and higher education qualifications, with level 10 being at the same level of difficulty as an honours degree and level 12 a doctoral degree. There is a correspondence between the UK frameworks and the European Qualifications Framework (EQF) as follows:

RQF/CQFW/FHEQ level	SCQF level	EQF level
8	12	8
7	11	7
6	10	6
6	9	6
5	8	5
4	7	5
3	6	4
2	5	3
1	4	2
E3	3	1
E2	2	N/A
E1	1	N/A

Qualifications also have credit sizes, using the UK Credit of 1 credit = 10 nominal hours of work or study (termed Total Qualification Time in the RQF). On the RQF, the terms 'Award', 'Certificate' and 'Diploma' are used to distinguish qualifications of 1 - 12 credits, 13 - 36 credits and 37+ credits respectively. An academic year is taken to consist of 120 credits, and a full calendar year 180 credits, so a bachelor's degree with honours normally totals 360 credits (split equally across FHEQ levels 4–6) in England, Wales and Northern Ireland or 480 credits (split equally across SCQF levels 7–10) in Scotland, while a doctoral degree (if credits are used) is 540 credits at FHEQ level 8/SCQF level 12. For comparison, the largest RQF qualification at level 8, the CMI Level 8 Diploma In Strategic Direction and Leadership, has a size of 67 credits.
