= Habitat (disambiguation) =

A habitat is the type of natural environment in which a particular species of organism lives.

Habitat may also refer to:

== Living environments ==
- Human habitat, a place where humans live, work or play
- Habitat 67, a housing complex in Montreal, Quebec, Canada
- Space habitat, a space station intended as a permanent settlement
- Space habitat (facility), a habitation module
- Underwater habitat, a fixed underwater structure in which people can live for extended periods

== Arts and media ==
- Habitat (film), a 1997 movie directed by Rene Daalder
- Habitat (magazine), an ongoing real-estate magazine founded in 1982
- Habitat (video game), a massively multiplayer online role-playing game
- Habitat, a Canadian alt pop band made up of duo John O'Regan and Sylvie Smith

== Organisations ==
- Habitat (retailer), a British home furnishings brand owned by J Sainsbury plc
- Groupe Habitat, an international home furnishings retailer owned by Thierry Le Guénic
- Habitat for Humanity, a non-profit organization devoted to building affordable housing
- United Nations Human Settlements Programme (UN-HABITAT), a United Nations agency

== Other uses ==
- Habitat (horse), an American-bred, British-trained Thoroughbred racehorse
- Habitat, a trade name for a positive pressure enclosure used to provide a safe environment for those doing hot work on offshore oil platforms

== See also ==
- Habitation (disambiguation)
- Microhabitat (film), a 2017 South Korean film
