= Jet engine =

Aircraft engine that produces thrust by emitting a jet of gas

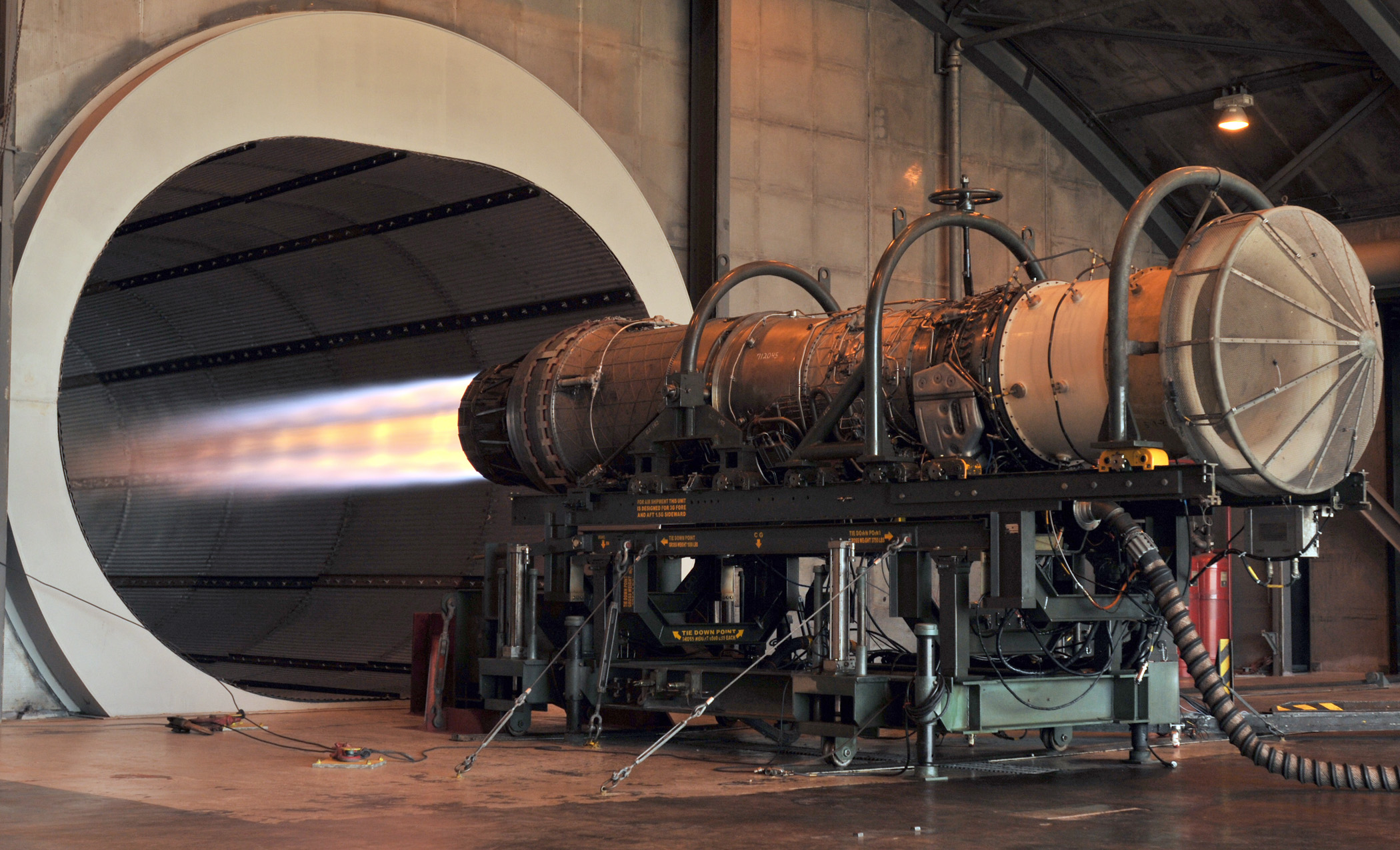
- A Pratt & Whitney F100 turbofan engine for the F-15 Eagle being tested in the hush house at Florida Air National Guard base
- Classification: Internal combustion engine
- Industry: Aerospace
- Application: Aviation
- Fuel source: Jet fuel
- Components: Dynamic compressor, fan, combustor, turbine, propelling nozzle
- Inventor: Frank Whittle, Hans von Ohain
- Invented: 1928, 1935

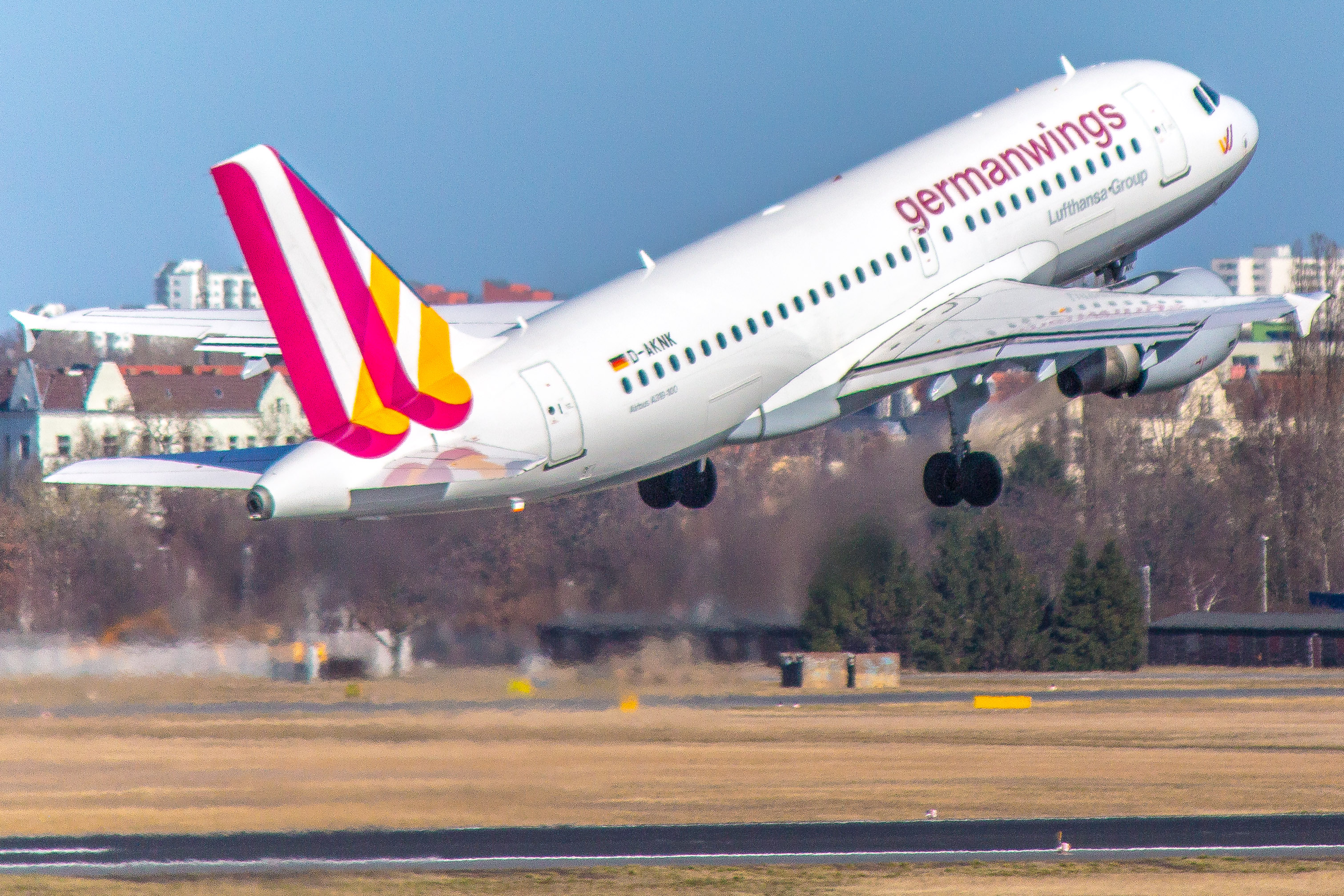
Jet engine during takeoff, showing visible heat haze through hot exhaust gas (Germanwings Airbus A319-100)

A jet engine is a type of reaction engine, discharging a fast-moving jet of heated gas (usually air) that generates thrust by jet propulsion. While this broad definition may include rocket, water jet, and hybrid propulsion, the term jet engine typically refers to an internal combustion air-breathing jet engine such as a turbojet, turbofan, ramjet, pulse jet, or scramjet. In general, jet engines are internal combustion engines.

Air-breathing jet engines typically feature a rotating air compressor powered by a turbine, with the leftover power providing thrust through the propelling nozzle—this process is known as the Brayton thermodynamic cycle. Jet aircraft use such engines for long-distance travel. Early jet aircraft used turbojet engines that were relatively inefficient for subsonic flight. Most modern subsonic jet aircraft use more complex high-bypass turbofan engines. They give higher speed and greater fuel efficiency than piston and propeller aeroengines over long distances. A few air-breathing engines made for high-speed applications (ramjets and scramjets) use the ram effect of the vehicle's speed instead of a mechanical compressor.

The thrust of a typical jetliner engine went from 5,000 lbf (22 kN) (de Havilland Ghost turbojet) in the 1950s to 115,000 lbf (510 kN) (General Electric GE90 turbofan) in the 1990s, and their reliability went from 40 in-flight shutdowns per 100,000 engine flight hours to less than 1 per 100,000 in the late 1990s. This, combined with greatly decreased fuel consumption, permitted routine transatlantic flight by twin-engined airliners by the turn of the century, where previously a similar journey would have required multiple fuel stops and three or more engines.

== History ==
Before the start of World War II, engineers were beginning to realize that engines driving propellers were approaching performance limits due to issues related to propeller efficiency, which declined as blade tips approached the speed of sound. If aircraft performance was to increase beyond this point, a different propulsion mechanism would be necessary. This was the motivation behind the development of the gas turbine engine, the most common form of jet engine.

The key to a practical jet engine was the gas turbine, extracting power from the engine itself to drive the compressor. The gas turbine was not a new idea: the patent for a stationary turbine was granted to John Barber in England in 1791. The first gas turbine to successfully run self-sustaining was built in 1903 by Norwegian engineer Ægidius Elling. Such engines did not reach manufacture due to issues of safety, reliability, weight and, especially, sustained operation.

The first patent for using a gas turbine to power an aircraft was filed in 1921 by Maxime Guillaume. His engine was an axial-flow turbojet, but was never constructed as it would have required considerable advances over the state of the art in compressors. Alan Arnold Griffith published An Aerodynamic Theory of Turbine Design in 1926 leading to experimental work at the RAE.

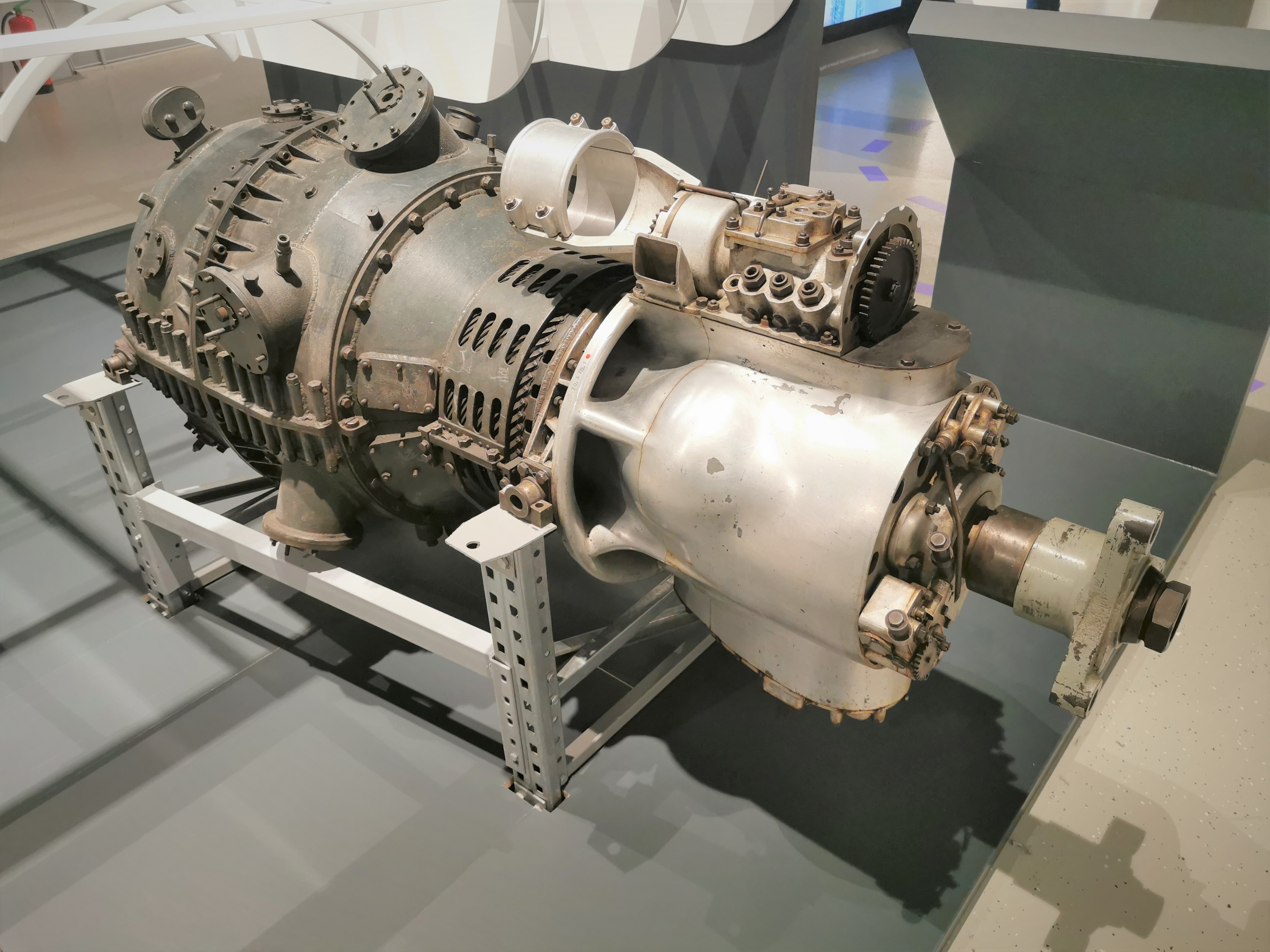
CS-1 Turboprop engine of György Jendrassik in 1940

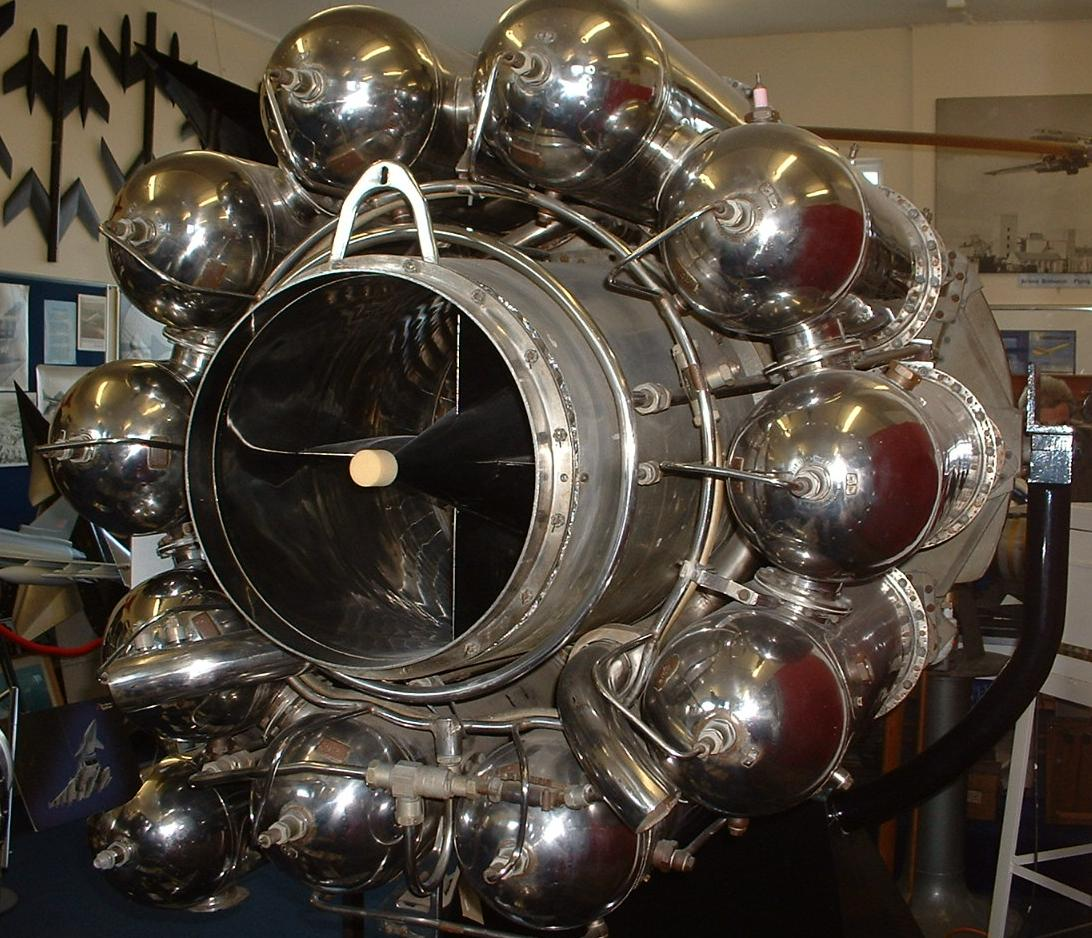
The Whittle W.2/700 engine flew in the Gloster E.28/39, the first British aircraft to fly with a turbojet engine, and the Gloster Meteor

In 1928, RAF College Cranwell cadet Frank Whittle formally submitted his ideas for a turbojet to his superiors. In October 1929, he developed his ideas further. On 16 January 1930, in England, Whittle submitted his first patent (granted in 1932). The patent showed a two-stage axial compressor feeding a single-sided centrifugal compressor. Practical axial compressors were made possible by ideas from A.A.Griffith in a seminal paper in 1926 ("An Aerodynamic Theory of Turbine Design"). Whittle would later concentrate on the simpler centrifugal compressor only. Whittle was unable to interest the government in his invention, and development continued at a slow pace.

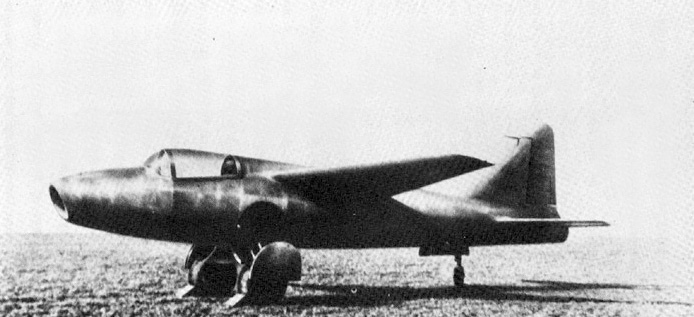
Heinkel He 178, the world's first aircraft to fly purely on turbojet power

In Spain, pilot and engineer Virgilio Leret Ruiz was granted a patent for a jet engine design in March 1935. Republican president Manuel Azaña arranged for initial construction at the Hispano-Suiza aircraft factory in Madrid in 1936, but Leret was executed months later by Francoist Moroccan troops after unsuccessfully defending his seaplane base on the first days of the Spanish Civil War. His plans, hidden from Francoists, were secretly given to the British embassy in Madrid a few years later by his wife, Carlota O'Neill, upon her release from prison.

In 1935, Hans von Ohain started work on a similar design to Whittle's in Germany, both compressor and turbine being radial, on opposite sides of the same disc, initially unaware of Whittle's work. Von Ohain's first device was strictly experimental and could run only under external power, but he was able to demonstrate the basic concept. Ohain was then introduced to Ernst Heinkel, one of the larger aircraft industrialists of the day, who immediately saw the promise of the design. Heinkel had recently purchased the Hirth engine company, and Ohain and his master machinist Max Hahn were set up there as a new division of the Hirth company. They had their first HeS 1 centrifugal engine running by September 1937. Unlike Whittle's design, Ohain used hydrogen as fuel, supplied under external pressure. Their subsequent designs culminated in the gasoline-fuelled HeS 3 of 5 kN (1,100 lbf), which was fitted to Heinkel's simple and compact He 178 airframe and flown by Erich Warsitz in the early morning of August 27, 1939, from Rostock-Marienehe aerodrome, an impressively short time for development. The He 178 was the world's first jet plane. Heinkel applied for a US patent covering the Aircraft Power Plant by Hans Joachim Pabst von Ohain on May 31, 1939; patent number US2256198, with M Hahn referenced as inventor. Von Ohain's design, an axial-flow engine, as opposed to Whittle's centrifugal flow engine, was eventually adopted by most manufacturers by the 1950s.

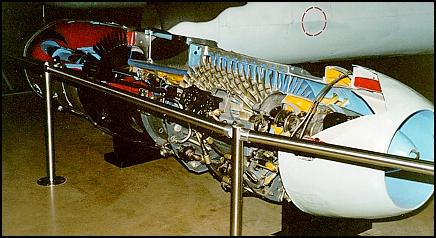
A cutaway of the Junkers Jumo 004 engine

Austrian Anselm Franz of Junkers' engine division (Junkers Motoren or "Jumo") introduced the axial-flow compressor in their jet engine. Jumo was assigned the next engine number in the RLM 109-0xx numbering sequence for gas turbine aircraft powerplants, "004", and the result was the Jumo 004 engine. After many lesser technical difficulties were solved, mass production of this engine started in 1944 as a powerplant for the world's first jet-fighter aircraft, the Messerschmitt Me 262 (and later the world's first jet-bomber aircraft, the Arado Ar 234). A variety of reasons conspired to delay the engine's availability, causing the fighter to arrive too late to improve Germany's position in World War II, however this was the first jet engine to be used in service.

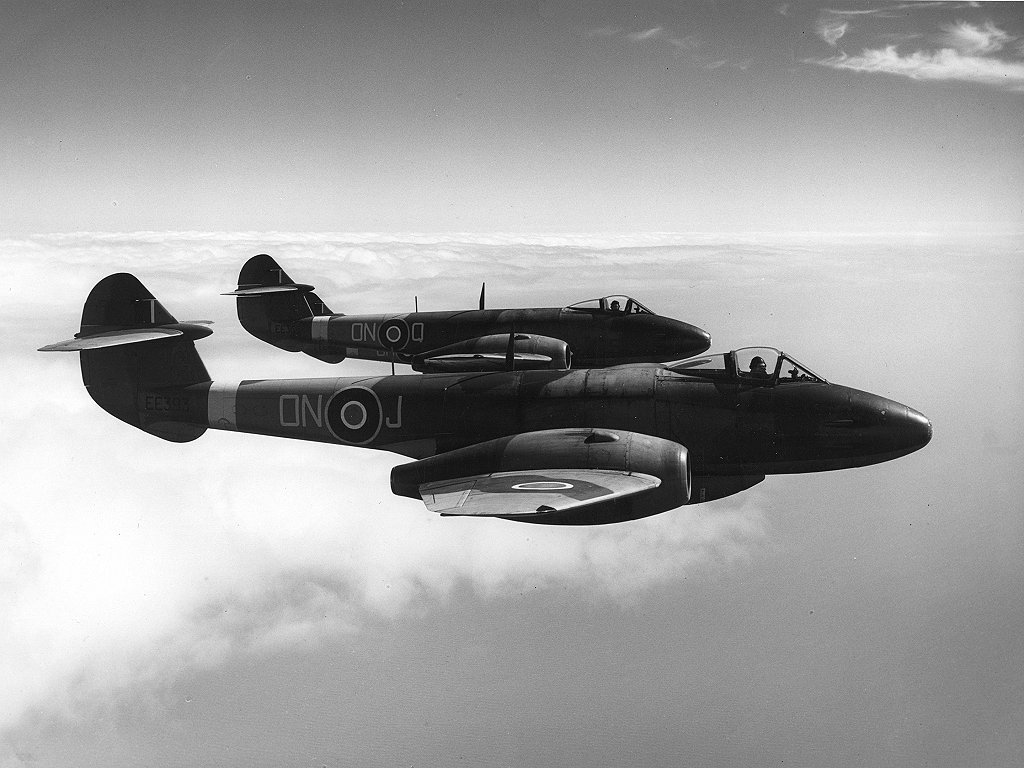
Gloster Meteor F.3s. The Gloster Meteor was the first British jet fighter and the Allies' only jet aircraft to achieve combat operations during World War II.

Meanwhile, in Britain the Gloster E28/39 had its maiden flight on 15 May 1941 and the Gloster Meteor finally entered service with the RAF in July 1944. These were powered by turbojet engines from Power Jets Ltd., set up by Frank Whittle. The first two operational turbojet aircraft, the Messerschmitt Me 262 and then the Gloster Meteor entered service within three months of each other in 1944; the Me 262 in April and the Gloster Meteor in July. The Meteor only saw around 15 aircraft enter World War II action, while up to 1400 Me 262 were produced, with 300 entering combat, delivering the first ground attacks and air combat victories of jet planes.

Following the end of the war the German jet aircraft and jet engines were extensively studied by the victorious allies and contributed to work on early Soviet and US jet fighters. The legacy of the axial-flow engine is seen in the fact that practically all jet engines on fixed-wing aircraft have had some inspiration from this design.

By the 1950s, the jet engine was almost universal in combat aircraft, with the exception of cargo, liaison and other specialty types. By this point, some of the British designs were already cleared for civilian use, and had appeared on early models like the de Havilland Comet and Avro Canada Jetliner. By the 1960s, all large civilian aircraft were also jet powered, leaving the piston engine in low-cost niche roles such as cargo flights.

The efficiency of turbojet engines was still rather worse than piston engines, but by the 1970s, with the advent of high-bypass turbofan jet engines (an innovation not foreseen by the early commentators such as Edgar Buckingham, at high speeds and high altitudes that seemed absurd to them), fuel efficiency was about the same as the best piston and propeller engines.

== Uses ==
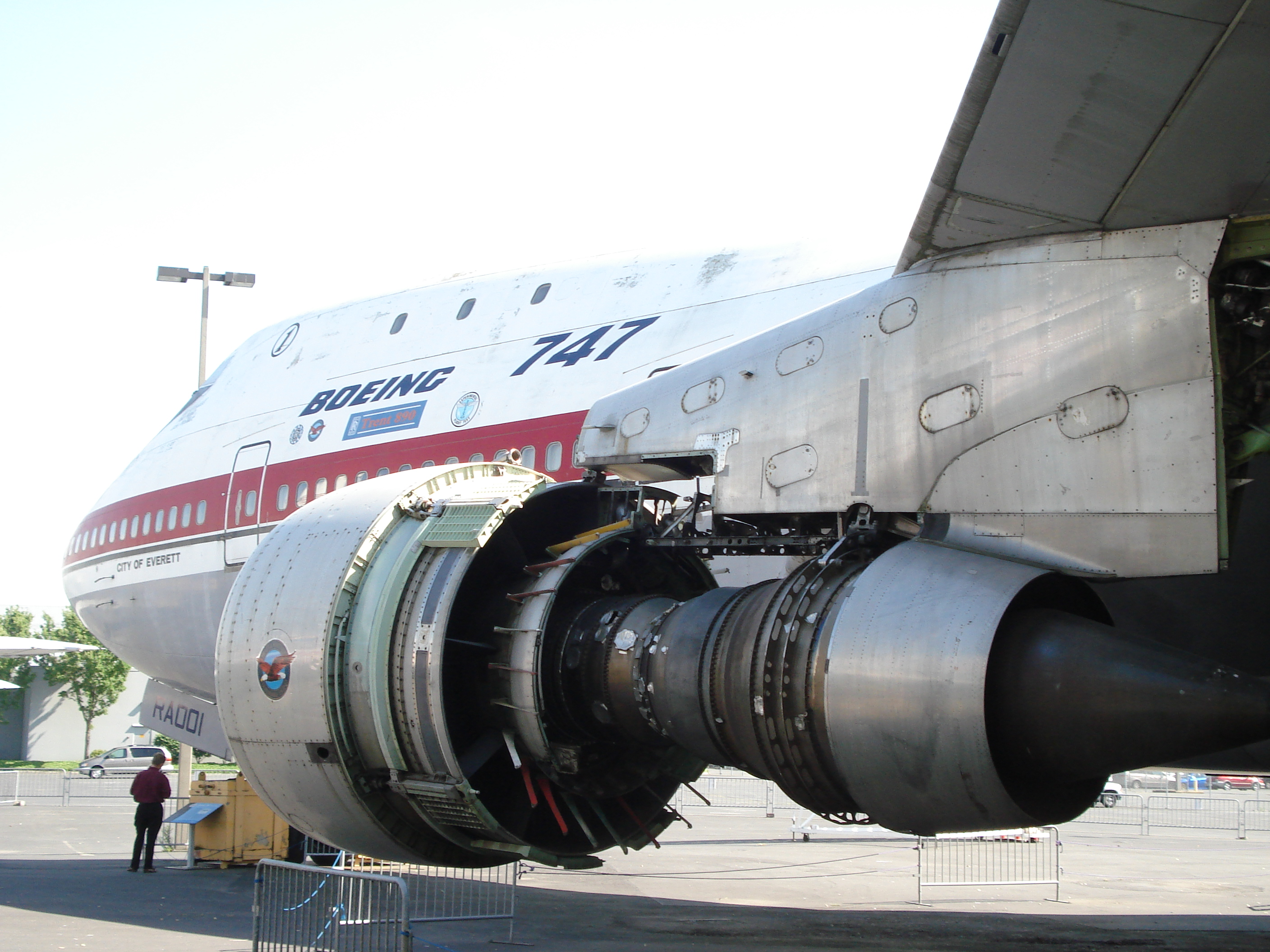
A JT9D turbofan jet engine installed on the City of Everett, Boeing's prototype 747

Jet engines power jet aircraft, cruise missiles and unmanned aerial vehicles. In the form of rocket engines they power model rocketry, spaceflight, and military missiles.

Jet engines have propelled high speed cars, particularly drag racers, with the all-time record held by a rocket car. A turbofan powered car, ThrustSSC, currently holds the land speed record.

Jet engine designs are frequently modified for non-aircraft applications, as industrial gas turbines or marine powerplants. These are used in electrical power generation, for powering water, natural gas, or oil pumps, and providing propulsion for ships and locomotives. Industrial gas turbines can create up to 50,000 shaft horsepower. Many of these engines are derived from older military turbojets such as the Pratt & Whitney J57 and J75 models. There is also a derivative of the P&W JT8D low-bypass turbofan that creates up to 35,000 horsepower (HP).

Jet engines are also sometimes developed into, or share certain components such as engine cores, with other gas turbine engine types. Turboshaft and turboprop engines, which are forms of gas turbine engines that are typically used to power helicopters and some propeller-driven aircraft.

== Types of jet engine ==
There are a large number of different types of jet engines, all of which achieve forward thrust from the principle of jet propulsion.

=== Airbreathing ===
Commonly aircraft are propelled by airbreathing jet engines. Most airbreathing jet engines that are in use are turbofan jet engines, which give good efficiency at speeds just below the speed of sound.

==== Turbojet ====
Turbojet engine

A turbojet engine is a gas turbine engine that works by compressing air with an inlet and a compressor (axial, centrifugal, or both), mixing fuel with the compressed air, burning the mixture in the combustor, and then passing the hot, high pressure air through a turbine and a nozzle. The compressor is powered by the turbine, which extracts energy from the expanding gas passing through it. The engine converts internal energy in the fuel to increased momentum of the gas flowing through the engine, producing thrust. All the air entering the compressor is passed through the combustor, and turbine, unlike the turbofan engine described below.

==== Turbofan ====
Schematic diagram illustrating the operation of a low-bypass turbofan engine.

Turbofans differ from turbojets in that they have an additional fan at the front of the engine, which accelerates air in a duct bypassing the core gas turbine engine. Turbofans are the dominant engine type for medium and long-range airliners.

Turbofans are usually more efficient than turbojets at subsonic speeds, but at high speeds their large frontal area generates more drag. Therefore, in supersonic flight, and in military and other aircraft where other considerations have a higher priority than fuel efficiency, fans tend to be smaller or absent.

Because of these distinctions, turbofan engine designs are often categorized as low-bypass or high-bypass, depending upon the amount of air which bypasses the core of the engine. Low-bypass turbofans have a bypass ratio of around 2:1 or less.

==== Propfan ====
A propfan engine is a type of airbreathing jet engine which combines aspects of turboprop and turbofan. Its design consists of a central gas turbine which drives open-air contra-rotating propellers. Unlike turboprop engines, in which the propeller and the engine are considered two separate products, the propfan’s gas generator and its unshrouded propeller module are heavily integrated and are considered to be a single product. Additionally, the propfan’s short, heavily twisted variable pitch blades closely remember the ducted fan blades of turbofan engines.

Propfans are designed to offer the speed and performance of turbofan engines with fuel efficiency of turboprops. However, due to low fuel costs and high cabin noise, early propfan projects were abandoned. Very few aircraft have flown with propfans, with the Antonov An-70 being the first and only aircraft to fly while being powered solely by propfan engines.

==== Advanced technology engine ====
The term Advanced technology engine refers to the modern generation of jet engines. The principle is that a turbine engine will function more efficiently if the various sets of turbines can revolve at their individual optimum speeds, instead of at the same speed. The true advanced technology engine has a triple spool, meaning that instead of having a single drive shaft, there are three, in order that the three sets of blades may revolve at different speeds. An interim state is a twin-spool engine, allowing only two different speeds for the turbines.

==== Ram compression ====
Ram compression jet engines are airbreathing engines similar to gas turbine engines in so far as they both use the Brayton cycle. Gas turbine and ram compression engines differ, however, in how they compress the incoming airflow. Whereas gas turbine engines use axial or centrifugal compressors to compress incoming air, ram engines rely only on air compressed in the inlet or diffuser. A ram engine thus requires a substantial initial forward airspeed before it can function. Ramjets are considered the simplest type of air breathing jet engine because they have no moving parts in the engine proper, only in the accessories.

Scramjets differ mainly in the fact that the air does not slow to subsonic speeds. Rather, they use supersonic combustion. They are efficient at even higher speed. Very few have been built or flown.

==== Non-continuous combustion ====
| Type | Description | Advantages | Disadvantages |
|---|---|---|---|
| Motorjet | Works like a turbojet but a piston engine drives the compressor instead of a turbine. | Higher exhaust velocity than a propeller, offering better thrust at high speed | Heavy, inefficient and underpowered. Example: Caproni Campini N.1. |
| Pulsejet | Air is compressed and combusted intermittently instead of continuously. Some designs use valves. | Very simple design, used for the V-1 flying bomb and more recently on model aircraft | Noisy, inefficient (low compression ratio), works poorly on a large scale, valves on valved designs wear out quickly |
| Pulse detonation engine | Similar to a pulsejet, but combustion occurs as a detonation instead of a deflagration, may or may not need valves | Maximum theoretical engine efficiency | Extremely noisy, parts subject to extreme mechanical fatigue, hard to start detonation, not practical for current use |

== Other types of jet propulsion ==
=== Rocket ===
Rocket engine propulsion

The rocket engine uses the same basic physical principles of thrust as a form of reaction engine, but is distinct from the jet engine in that it does not require atmospheric air to provide oxygen; the rocket carries all components of the reaction mass. However some definitions treat it as a form of jet propulsion.

Because rockets do not breathe air, this allows them to operate at arbitrary altitudes and in space.

This type of engine is used for launching satellites, space exploration and crewed access, and permitted landing on the Moon in 1969.

Rocket engines are used for high altitude flights, or anywhere where very high accelerations are needed since rocket engines themselves have a very high thrust-to-weight ratio.

However, the high exhaust speed and the heavier, oxidizer-rich propellant results in far more propellant use than turbofans. Even so, at extremely high speeds they become energy-efficient.

An approximate equation for the net thrust of a rocket engine is:

$$F_N = \dot m\, g_0\, I_\text{sp,vac} - A_e\, p \;$$

Where $F_N$ is the net thrust, $I_\text{sp,vac}$ is the specific impulse, $g_0$ is a standard gravity, $\dot m$ is the propellant flow in kg/s, $A_e$ is the cross-sectional area at the exit of the exhaust nozzle, and $p$ is the atmospheric pressure.

| Type | Description | Advantages | Disadvantages |
|---|---|---|---|
| Rocket | Carries all propellants and oxidants on board, emits jet for propulsion | Very few moving parts. Mach 0 to Mach 25+; efficient at very high speed (> Mach 5.0 or so). Thrust/weight ratio over 100. No complex air inlet. High compression ratio. Very high-speed (hypersonic) exhaust. Good cost/thrust ratio. Fairly easy to test. Works in a vacuum; indeed, works best outside the atmosphere, which is kinder on vehicle structure at high speed. Fairly small surface area to keep cool, and no turbine in hot exhaust stream. Very high-temperature combustion and high expansion-ratio nozzle gives very high efficiency, at very high speeds. | Needs lots of propellant. Very low specific impulse – typically 100–450 seconds. Extreme thermal stresses of combustion chamber can make reuse harder. Typically requires carrying oxidizer on-board which increases risks. Extraordinarily noisy. |

=== Hybrid ===
Combined-cycle engines simultaneously use two or more different principles of jet propulsion.

| Type | Description | Advantages | Disadvantages |
|---|---|---|---|
| Turborocket | A turbojet where an additional oxidizer such as oxygen is added to the airstream to increase maximum altitude | Very close to existing designs, operates in very high altitude, wide range of altitude and airspeed | Airspeed limited to same range as turbojet engine, carrying oxidizer like LOX can be dangerous. Much heavier than simple rockets. |
| Air-augmented rocket | Essentially a ramjet where intake air is compressed and burnt with the exhaust from a rocket | Mach 0 to Mach 4.5+ (can also run exoatmospheric), good efficiency at Mach 2 to 4 | Similar efficiency to rockets at low speed or exoatmospheric, inlet difficulties, a relatively undeveloped and unexplored type, cooling difficulties, very noisy, thrust/weight ratio is similar to ramjets. |
| Precooled jets / LACE | Intake air is chilled to very low temperatures at inlet in a heat exchanger before passing through a ramjet and/or turbojet and/or rocket engine. | Easily tested on ground. Very high thrust/weight ratios are possible (~14) together with good fuel efficiency over a wide range of airspeeds, Mach 0–5.5+; this combination of efficiencies may permit launching to orbit, single stage, or very rapid, very long distance intercontinental travel. | Exists only at the lab prototyping stage. Examples include RB545, Reaction Engines SABRE, ATREX. Requires liquid hydrogen fuel which has very low density and requires heavily insulated tankage. |

=== Water jet ===
A water jet, or pump-jet, is a marine propulsion system that uses a jet of water. The mechanical arrangement may be a ducted propeller with nozzle, or a centrifugal compressor and nozzle. The pump-jet must be driven by a separate engine such as a Diesel or gas turbine.

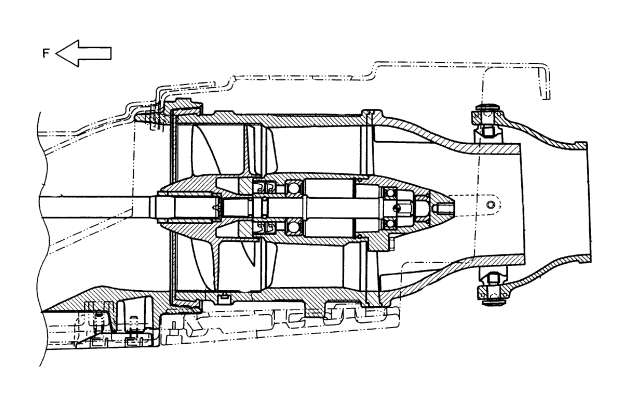
A pump jet schematic.

| Type | Description | Advantages | Disadvantages |
|---|---|---|---|
| Water jet | For propelling water rockets and jetboats; squirts water out the back through a nozzle | In boats, can run in shallow water, high acceleration, no risk of engine overload (unlike propellers), less noise and vibration, highly maneuverable at all boat speeds, high speed efficiency, less vulnerable to damage from debris, very reliable, more load flexibility, less harmful to wildlife | Can be less efficient than a propeller at low speed, more expensive, higher weight in boat due to entrained water, will not perform well if boat is heavier than the jet is sized for |

== General physical principles ==
All jet engines are reaction engines that generate thrust by emitting a jet of fluid rearwards at relatively high speed. The forces on the inside of the engine needed to create this jet give a strong thrust on the engine which pushes the craft forwards.

Jet engines make their jet from propellant stored in tanks that are attached to the engine (as in a 'rocket') as well as in duct engines (those commonly used on aircraft) by ingesting an external fluid (very typically air) and expelling it at higher speed.

=== Propelling nozzle ===
A propelling nozzle produces a high velocity exhaust jet. Propelling nozzles turn internal heat and pressure energy into high velocity kinetic energy. The total pressure and temperature don't change through the nozzle but their static values drop as the gas speeds up.

The velocity of the air entering the nozzle is low, about Mach 0.4, a prerequisite for minimizing pressure losses in the duct leading to the nozzle. The temperature entering the nozzle may be as low as sea level ambient for a fan nozzle in the cold air at cruise altitudes. It may be as high as the 1000 Kelvin exhaust gas temperature for a supersonic afterburning engine or 2200 K with afterburner lit. The pressure entering the nozzle may vary from 1.5 times the pressure outside the nozzle, for a single stage fan, to 30 times for the fastest manned aircraft at Mach 3+.

Convergent nozzles are only able to accelerate the gas up to local sonic (Mach 1) conditions. To reach high flight speeds, even greater exhaust velocities are required, and so a convergent-divergent nozzle is needed on high-speed aircraft.

The engine thrust is highest if the static pressure of the gas reaches the ambient value as it leaves the nozzle. This only happens if the nozzle exit area is the correct value for the nozzle pressure ratio (npr). Since the npr changes with engine thrust setting and flight speed this is seldom the case. Also at supersonic speeds the divergent area is less than required to give complete internal expansion to ambient pressure as a trade-off with external body drag. Whitford gives the F-16 as an example. Other underexpanded examples were the XB-70 and SR-71.

The nozzle size, together with the area of the turbine nozzles, determines the operating pressure of the compressor.

=== Energy efficiency relating to aircraft jet engines ===
A jet engine at rest, as on a test stand, sucks in fuel and generates thrust. How well it does this is judged by how much fuel it uses and what force is required to restrain it. This is a measure of its efficiency. If something deteriorates inside the engine (known as performance deterioration) it will be less efficient and this will show when the fuel produces less thrust. If a change is made to an internal part which allows the air/combustion gases to flow more smoothly the engine will be more efficient and use less fuel. A standard definition is used to assess how different things change engine efficiency and also to allow comparisons to be made between different engines. This definition is called specific fuel consumption, or how much fuel is needed to produce one unit of thrust. For example, it will be known for a particular engine design that if some bumps in a bypass duct are smoothed out the air will flow more smoothly giving a pressure loss reduction of x% and y% less fuel will be needed to get the take-off thrust, for example. This understanding comes under the engineering discipline Jet engine performance. How efficiency is affected by forward speed and by supplying energy to aircraft systems is mentioned later.

The efficiency of the engine is controlled primarily by the operating conditions inside the engine which are the pressure produced by the compressor and the temperature of the combustion gases at the first set of rotating turbine blades. The pressure is the highest air pressure in the engine. The turbine rotor temperature is not the highest in the engine but is the highest at which energy transfer takes place (higher temperatures occur in the combustor). The above pressure and temperature are shown on a Thermodynamic cycle diagram.

The efficiency is further modified by how smoothly the air and the combustion gases flow through the engine, how well the flow is aligned (known as incidence angle) with the moving and stationary passages in the compressors and turbines. Non-optimum angles, as well as non-optimum passage and blade shapes can cause thickening and separation of Boundary layers and formation of Shock waves. It is important to slow the flow (lower speed means less pressure losses or Pressure drop) when it travels through ducts connecting the different parts. How well the individual components contribute to turning fuel into thrust is quantified by measures like efficiencies for the compressors, turbines and combustor and pressure losses for the ducts. These are shown as lines on a Thermodynamic cycle diagram.

The engine efficiency, or thermal efficiency, known as $\eta_{th}$. is dependent on the Thermodynamic cycle parameters, maximum pressure and temperature, and on component efficiencies, $\eta_{compressor}$, $\eta_{combustion}$ and $\eta_{turbine}$ and duct pressure losses.

The engine needs compressed air for itself just to run successfully. This air comes from its own compressor and is called secondary air. It does not contribute to making thrust so makes the engine less efficient. It is used to preserve the mechanical integrity of the engine, to stop parts overheating and to prevent oil escaping from bearings for example. Only some of this air taken from the compressors returns to the turbine flow to contribute to thrust production. Any reduction in the amount needed improves the engine efficiency. Again, it will be known for a particular engine design that a reduced requirement for cooling flow of x% will reduce the specific fuel consumption by y%. In other words, less fuel will be required to give take-off thrust, for example. The engine is more efficient.

All of the above considerations are basic to the engine running on its own and, at the same time, doing nothing useful, i.e. it is not moving an aircraft or supplying energy for the aircraft's electrical, hydraulic and air systems. In the aircraft the engine gives away some of its thrust-producing potential, or fuel, to power these systems. These requirements, which cause installation losses, reduce its efficiency. It is using some fuel that does not contribute to the engine's thrust.

Finally, when the aircraft is flying the propelling jet itself contains wasted kinetic energy after it has left the engine. This is quantified by the term propulsive, or Froude, efficiency $\eta_p$ and may be reduced by redesigning the engine to give it bypass flow and a lower speed for the propelling jet, for example as a turboprop or turbofan engine. At the same time forward speed increases the $\eta_{th}$ by increasing the Overall pressure ratio.

The overall efficiency of the engine at flight speed is defined as $\eta_o = \eta_p\eta_{th}$.

The $\eta_o$ at flight speed depends on how well the intake compresses the air before it is handed over to the engine compressors. The intake compression ratio, which can be as high as 32:1 at Mach 3, adds to that of the engine compressor to give the Overall pressure ratio and $\eta_{th}$ for the Thermodynamic cycle. How well it does this is defined by its pressure recovery or measure of the losses in the intake. Mach 3 manned flight has provided an interesting illustration of how these losses can increase dramatically in an instant. The North American XB-70 Valkyrie and Lockheed SR-71 Blackbird at Mach 3 each had pressure recoveries of about 0.8, due to relatively low losses during the compression process, i.e. through systems of multiple shocks. During an 'unstart' the efficient shock system would be replaced by a very inefficient single shock beyond the inlet and an intake pressure recovery of about 0.3 and a correspondingly low pressure ratio.

The propelling nozzle at speeds above about Mach 2 usually has extra internal thrust losses because the exit area is not big enough as a trade-off with external afterbody drag.

Although a bypass engine improves propulsive efficiency it incurs losses of its own inside the engine itself. Machinery has to be added to transfer energy from the gas generator to a bypass airflow. The low loss from the propelling nozzle of a turbojet is added to with extra losses due to inefficiencies in the added turbine and fan. These may be included in a transmission, or transfer, efficiency $\eta_T$. However, these losses are more than made up by the improvement in propulsive efficiency. There are also extra pressure losses in the bypass duct and an extra propelling nozzle.

With the advent of turbofans with their loss-making machinery what goes on inside the engine has been separated by Bennett, for example, between gas generator and transfer machinery giving $\eta_o = \eta_p \eta_{th} \eta_T$.

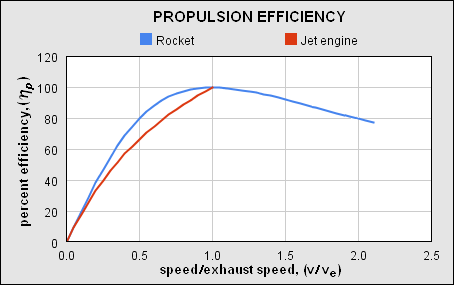
Dependence of propulsion efficiency (η) upon the vehicle speed/exhaust velocity ratio (v/v_{e}) for air-breathing jet and rocket engines.

The energy efficiency ($\eta_o$) of jet engines installed in vehicles has two main components:

- propulsive efficiency ($\eta_p$): how much of the energy of the jet ends up in the vehicle body rather than being carried away as kinetic energy of the jet.
- cycle efficiency ($\eta_{th}$): how efficiently the engine can accelerate the jet

Even though overall energy efficiency $\eta_o$ is:

$$\eta_o= \eta_p \eta_{th}$$

for all jet engines the propulsive efficiency is highest as the exhaust jet velocity gets closer to the vehicle speed as this gives the smallest residual kinetic energy. (Note: Note: In Newtonian mechanics kinetic energy is frame dependent. The kinetic energy is easiest to calculate when the speed is measured in the center of mass frame of the vehicle and (less obviously) its reaction mass / air (i.e., the stationary frame before takeoff begins.) For an airbreathing engine an exhaust velocity equal to the vehicle velocity, or a $\eta_p$ equal to one, gives zero thrust with no net momentum change. The formula for air-breathing engines moving at speed $v$ with an exhaust velocity $v_e$, and neglecting fuel flow, is:

$$\eta_p = \frac{2}{1 + \frac{v_e}{v}}$$

And for a rocket:

$$\eta_p= \frac {2\, (\frac {v} {v_e})} {1 + ( \frac {v} {v_e} )^2 }$$

In addition to propulsive efficiency, another factor is cycle efficiency; a jet engine is a form of heat engine. Heat engine efficiency is determined by the ratio of temperatures reached in the engine to that exhausted at the nozzle. This has improved constantly over time as new materials have been introduced to allow higher maximum cycle temperatures. For example, composite materials, combining metals with ceramics, have been developed for HP turbine blades, which run at the maximum cycle temperature. The efficiency is also limited by the overall pressure ratio that can be achieved. Cycle efficiency is highest in rocket engines (~60+%), as they can achieve extremely high combustion temperatures. Cycle efficiency in turbojet and similar is nearer to 30%, due to much lower peak cycle temperatures.

Typical combustion efficiency of an aircraft gas turbine over the operational range.

Typical combustion stability limits of an aircraft gas turbine.

The combustion efficiency of most aircraft gas turbine engines at sea level takeoff conditions is almost 100%. It decreases nonlinearly to 98% at altitude cruise conditions. Air-fuel ratio ranges from 50:1 to 130:1. For any type of combustion chamber there is a rich and weak limit to the air-fuel ratio, beyond which the flame is extinguished. The range of air-fuel ratio between the rich and weak limits is reduced with an increase of air velocity. If the increasing air mass flow reduces the fuel ratio below certain value, flame extinction occurs.

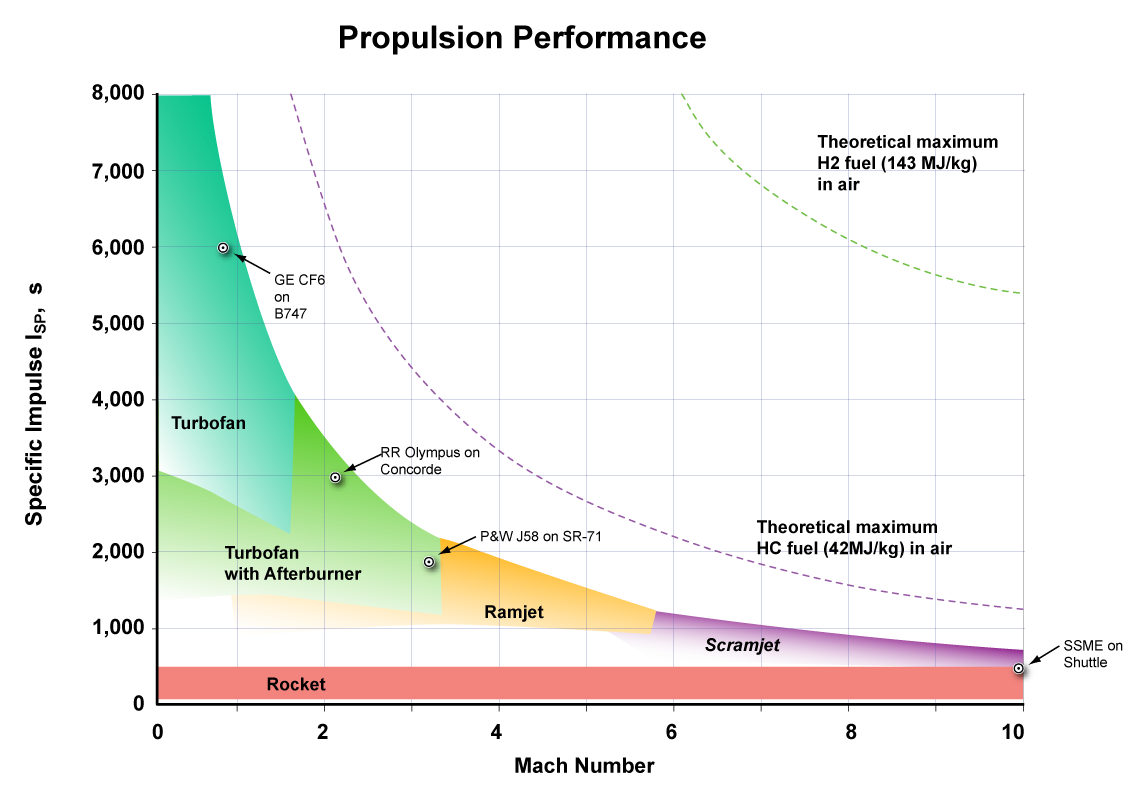
Specific impulse as a function of speed for different jet types with kerosene fuel (hydrogen I_{sp} would be about twice as high). Although efficiency plummets with speed, greater distances are covered. Efficiency per unit distance (per km or mile) is roughly independent of speed for jet engines as a group; however, airframes become inefficient at supersonic speeds.

=== Consumption of fuel or propellant ===
A closely related (but different) concept to energy efficiency is the rate of consumption of propellant mass. Propellant consumption in jet engines is measured by specific fuel consumption, specific impulse, or effective exhaust velocity. They all measure the same thing. Specific impulse and effective exhaust velocity are strictly proportional, whereas specific fuel consumption is inversely proportional to the others.

For air-breathing engines such as turbojets, energy efficiency and propellant (fuel) efficiency are much the same thing, since the propellant is a fuel and the source of energy. In rocketry, the propellant is also the exhaust, and this means that a high energy propellant gives better propellant efficiency but can in some cases actually give lower energy efficiency.

It can be seen in the table (just below) that the subsonic turbofans such as General Electric's CF6 turbofan use a lot less fuel to generate thrust for a second than did the Concorde's Rolls-Royce/Snecma Olympus 593 turbojet. However, since energy is force times distance and the distance per second was greater for the Concorde, the actual power generated by the engine for the same amount of fuel was higher for the Concorde at Mach 2 than the CF6. Thus, the Concorde's engines were more efficient in terms of energy per distance traveled.

Rocket engines in vacuum
| Model | Type | First run | Application | TSFC | | I_{sp} (by weight) | I_{sp} (by mass) |
| Model | Type | First run | Application | lb/lbf·h | g/kN·s | s | m/s |
|---|---|---|---|---|---|---|---|
| Avio P80 | solid fuel | 2006 | Vega stage 1 | 13 | 360 | 280 | 2700 |
| Avio Zefiro 23 | solid fuel | 2006 | Vega stage 2 | 12.52 | 354.7 | 287.5 | 2819 |
| Avio Zefiro 9A | solid fuel | 2008 | Vega stage 3 | 12.20 | 345.4 | 295.2 | 2895 |
| Merlin 1D | liquid fuel | 2013 | Falcon 9 | 12 | 330 | 310 | 3000 |
| RD-843 | liquid fuel | 2012 | Vega upper stage | 11.41 | 323.2 | 315.5 | 3094 |
| Kuznetsov NK-33 | liquid fuel | 1970s | N-1F, Soyuz-2-1v stage 1 | 10.9 | 308 | 331 | 3250 |
| NPO Energomash RD-171M | liquid fuel | 1985 | Zenit-2M, -3SL, -3SLB, -3F stage 1 | 10.7 | 303 | 337 | 3300 |
| LE-7A | cryogenic | 2001 | H-IIA, H-IIB stage 1 | 8.22 | 233 | 438 | 4300 |
| Snecma HM-7B | cryogenic | 1979 | Ariane 2, 3, 4, 5 ECA upper stage | 8.097 | 229.4 | 444.6 | 4360 |
| LE-5B-2 | cryogenic | 2009 | H-IIA, H-IIB upper stage | 8.05 | 228 | 447 | 4380 |
| Aerojet Rocketdyne RS-25 | cryogenic | 1981 | Space Shuttle, SLS stage 1 | 7.95 | 225 | 453 | 4440 |
| Aerojet Rocketdyne RL-10B-2 | cryogenic | 1998 | Delta III, Delta IV, SLS upper stage | 7.734 | 219.1 | 465.5 | 4565 |
| NERVA NRX A6 | nuclear | 1967 | | | | 869 | |

Jet engines with Reheat, static, sea level
| Model | Type | First run | Application | TSFC | | I_{sp} (by weight) | I_{sp} (by mass) |
| Model | Type | First run | Application | lb/lbf·h | g/kN·s | s | m/s |
|---|---|---|---|---|---|---|---|
| Turbo-Union RB.199 | turbofan | | Tornado | 2.5 | 70.8 | 1440 | 14120 |
| GE F101-GE-102 | turbofan | 1970s | B-1B | 2.46 | 70 | 1460 | 14400 |
| Tumansky R-25-300 | turbojet | | MIG-21bis | 2.206 | 62.5 | 1632 | 16000 |
| GE J85-GE-21 | turbojet | | F-5E/F | 2.13 | 60.3 | 1690 | 16570 |
| GE F110-GE-132 | turbofan | | F-16E/F | 2.09 | 59.2 | 1722 | 16890 |
| Honeywell/ITEC F125 | turbofan | | F-CK-1 | 2.06 | 58.4 | 1748 | 17140 |
| Snecma M53-P2 | turbofan | | Mirage 2000C/D/N | 2.05 | 58.1 | 1756 | 17220 |
| Snecma Atar 09C | turbojet | | Mirage III | 2.03 | 57.5 | 1770 | 17400 |
| Snecma Atar 09K-50 | turbojet | | Mirage IV, 50, F1 | 1.991 | 56.4 | 1808 | 17730 |
| GE J79-GE-15 | turbojet | | F-4E/EJ/F/G, RF-4E | 1.965 | 55.7 | 1832 | 17970 |
| Saturn AL-31F | turbofan | | Su-27/P/K | 1.96 | 55.5 | 1837 | 18010 |
| GE F110-GE-129 | turbofan | | F-16C/D, F-15EX | 1.9 | 53.8 | 1895 | 18580 |
| Soloviev D-30F6 | turbofan | | MiG-31, S-37/Su-47 | 1.863 | 52.8 | 1932 | 18950 |
| Lyulka AL-21F-3 | turbojet | | Su-17, Su-22 | 1.86 | 52.7 | 1935 | 18980 |
| Klimov RD-33 | turbofan | 1974 | MiG-29 | 1.85 | 52.4 | 1946 | 19080 |
| Saturn AL-41F-1S | turbofan | | Su-35S/T-10BM | 1.819 | 51.5 | 1979 | 19410 |
| Volvo RM12 | turbofan | 1978 | Gripen A/B/C/D | 1.78 | 50.4 | 2022 | 19830 |
| GE F404-GE-402 | turbofan | | F/A-18C/D | 1.74 | 49 | 2070 | 20300 |
| Kuznetsov NK-32 | turbofan | 1980 | Tu-144LL, Tu-160 | 1.7 | 48 | 2100 | 21000 |
| Snecma M88-2 | turbofan | 1989 | Rafale | 1.663 | 47.11 | 2165 | 21230 |
| Eurojet EJ200 | turbofan | 1991 | Eurofighter | 1.66–1.73 | 47–49 | 2080–2170 | 20400–21300 |

Dry jet engines, static, sea level
| Model | Type | First run | Application | TSFC | | I_{sp} (by weight) | I_{sp} (by mass) |
| Model | Type | First run | Application | lb/lbf·h | g/kN·s | s | m/s |
|---|---|---|---|---|---|---|---|
| GE J85-GE-21 | turbojet | | F-5E/F | 1.24 | 35.1 | 2900 | 28500 |
| Snecma Atar 09C | turbojet | | Mirage III | 1.01 | 28.6 | 3560 | 35000 |
| Snecma Atar 09K-50 | turbojet | | Mirage IV, 50, F1 | 0.981 | 27.8 | 3670 | 36000 |
| Snecma Atar 08K-50 | turbojet | | Super Étendard | 0.971 | 27.5 | 3710 | 36400 |
| Tumansky R-25-300 | turbojet | | MIG-21bis | 0.961 | 27.2 | 3750 | 36700 |
| Lyulka AL-21F-3 | turbojet | | Su-17, Su-22 | 0.86 | 24.4 | 4190 | 41100 |
| GE J79-GE-15 | turbojet | | F-4E/EJ/F/G, RF-4E | 0.85 | 24.1 | 4240 | 41500 |
| Snecma M53-P2 | turbofan | | Mirage 2000C/D/N | 0.85 | 24.1 | 4240 | 41500 |
| Volvo RM12 | turbofan | 1978 | Gripen A/B/C/D | 0.824 | 23.3 | 4370 | 42800 |
| RR Turbomeca Adour | turbofan | 1999 | Jaguar retrofit | 0.81 | 23 | 4400 | 44000 |
| Honeywell/ITEC F124 | turbofan | 1979 | L-159, X-45 | 0.81 | 22.9 | 4440 | 43600 |
| Honeywell/ITEC F125 | turbofan | | F-CK-1 | 0.8 | 22.7 | 4500 | 44100 |
| PW J52-P-408 | turbojet | | A-4M/N, TA-4KU, EA-6B | 0.79 | 22.4 | 4560 | 44700 |
| Saturn AL-41F-1S | turbofan | | Su-35S/T-10BM | 0.79 | 22.4 | 4560 | 44700 |
| Snecma M88-2 | turbofan | 1989 | Rafale | 0.782 | 22.14 | 4600 | 45100 |
| Klimov RD-33 | turbofan | 1974 | MiG-29 | 0.77 | 21.8 | 4680 | 45800 |
| RR Pegasus 11-61 | turbofan | | AV-8B+ | 0.76 | 21.5 | 4740 | 46500 |
| Eurojet EJ200 | turbofan | 1991 | Eurofighter | 0.74–0.81 | 21–23 | 4400–4900 | 44000–48000 |
| GE F414-GE-400 | turbofan | 1993 | F/A-18E/F | 0.724 | 20.5 | 4970 | 48800 |
| Kuznetsov NK-32 | turbofan | 1980 | Tu-144LL, Tu-160 | 0.72-0.73 | 20–21 | 4900–5000 | 48000–49000 |
| Soloviev D-30F6 | turbofan | | MiG-31, S-37/Su-47 | 0.716 | 20.3 | 5030 | 49300 |
| Snecma Larzac | turbofan | 1972 | Alpha Jet | 0.716 | 20.3 | 5030 | 49300 |
| IHI F3 | turbofan | 1981 | Kawasaki T-4 | 0.7 | 19.8 | 5140 | 50400 |
| Saturn AL-31F | turbofan | | Su-27 /P/K | 0.666-0.78 | 18.9–22.1 | 4620–5410 | 45300–53000 |
| RR Spey RB.168 | turbofan | | AMX | 0.66 | 18.7 | 5450 | 53500 |
| GE F110-GE-129 | turbofan | | F-16C/D, F-15 | 0.64 | 18 | 5600 | 55000 |
| GE F110-GE-132 | turbofan | | F-16E/F | 0.64 | 18 | 5600 | 55000 |
| Turbo-Union RB.199 | turbofan | | Tornado ECR | 0.637 | 18.0 | 5650 | 55400 |
| PW F119-PW-100 | turbofan | 1992 | F-22 | 0.61 | 17.3 | 5900 | 57900 |
| Turbo-Union RB.199 | turbofan | | Tornado | 0.598 | 16.9 | 6020 | 59000 |
| GE F101-GE-102 | turbofan | 1970s | B-1B | 0.562 | 15.9 | 6410 | 62800 |
| PW TF33-P-3 | turbofan | | B-52H, NB-52H | 0.52 | 14.7 | 6920 | 67900 |
| RR AE 3007H | turbofan | | RQ-4, MQ-4C | 0.39 | 11.0 | 9200 | 91000 |
| GE F118-GE-100 | turbofan | 1980s | B-2 | 0.375 | 10.6 | 9600 | 94000 |
| GE F118-GE-101 | turbofan | 1980s | U-2S | 0.375 | 10.6 | 9600 | 94000 |
| General Electric CF6-50C2 | turbofan | | A300, DC-10-30 | 0.371 | 10.5 | 9700 | 95000 |
| GE TF34-GE-100 | turbofan | | A-10 | 0.37 | 10.5 | 9700 | 95000 |
| CFM CFM56-2B1 | turbofan | | C-135, RC-135 | 0.36 | 10 | 10000 | 98000 |
| Progress D-18T | turbofan | 1980 | An-124, An-225 | 0.345 | 9.8 | 10400 | 102000 |
| PW F117-PW-100 | turbofan | | C-17 | 0.34 | 9.6 | 10600 | 104000 |
| PW PW2040 | turbofan | | Boeing 757 | 0.33 | 9.3 | 10900 | 107000 |
| CFM CFM56-3C1 | turbofan | | 737 Classic | 0.33 | 9.3 | 11000 | 110000 |
| GE CF6-80C2 | turbofan | | 744, 767, MD-11, A300/310, C-5M | 0.307-0.344 | 8.7–9.7 | 10500–11700 | 103000–115000 |
| EA GP7270 | turbofan | | A380-861 | 0.299 | 8.5 | 12000 | 118000 |
| GE GE90-85B | turbofan | | 777-200/200ER/300 | 0.298 | 8.44 | 12080 | 118500 |
| GE GE90-94B | turbofan | | 777-200/200ER/300 | 0.2974 | 8.42 | 12100 | 118700 |
| RR Trent 970-84 | turbofan | 2003 | A380-841 | 0.295 | 8.36 | 12200 | 119700 |
| GE GEnx-1B70 | turbofan | | 787-8 | 0.2845 | 8.06 | 12650 | 124100 |
| RR Trent 1000C | turbofan | 2006 | 787-9 | 0.273 | 7.7 | 13200 | 129000 |

Jet engines, cruise
| Model | Type | First run | Application | TSFC | | I_{sp} (by weight) | I_{sp} (by mass) |
| Model | Type | First run | Application | lb/lbf·h | g/kN·s | s | m/s |
|---|---|---|---|---|---|---|---|
| | Ramjet | | Mach 1 | 4.5 | 130 | 800 | 7800 |
| J-58 | turbojet | 1958 | SR-71 at Mach 3.2 (Reheat) | 1.9 | 53.8 | 1895 | 18580 |
| RR/Snecma Olympus | turbojet | 1966 | Concorde at Mach 2 | 1.195 | 33.8 | 3010 | 29500 |
| PW JT8D-9 | turbofan | | 737 Original | 0.8 | 22.7 | 4500 | 44100 |
| Honeywell ALF502R-5 | GTF | | BAe 146 | 0.72 | 20.4 | 5000 | 49000 |
| Soloviev D-30KP-2 | turbofan | | Il-76, Il-78 | 0.715 | 20.3 | 5030 | 49400 |
| Soloviev D-30KU-154 | turbofan | | Tu-154M | 0.705 | 20.0 | 5110 | 50100 |
| RR Tay RB.183 | turbofan | 1984 | Fokker 70, Fokker 100 | 0.69 | 19.5 | 5220 | 51200 |
| GE CF34-3 | turbofan | 1982 | Challenger, CRJ100/200 | 0.69 | 19.5 | 5220 | 51200 |
| GE CF34-8E | turbofan | | E170/175 | 0.68 | 19.3 | 5290 | 51900 |
| Honeywell TFE731-60 | GTF | | Falcon 900 | 0.679 | 19.2 | 5300 | 52000 |
| CFM CFM56-2C1 | turbofan | | DC-8 Super 70 | 0.671 | 19.0 | 5370 | 52600 |
| GE CF34-8C | turbofan | | CRJ700/900/1000 | 0.67-0.68 | 19–19 | 5300–5400 | 52000–53000 |
| CFM CFM56-3C1 | turbofan | | 737 Classic | 0.667 | 18.9 | 5400 | 52900 |
| CFM CFM56-2A2 | turbofan | 1974 | E-3, E-6 | 0.66 | 18.7 | 5450 | 53500 |
| RR BR725 | turbofan | 2008 | G650/ER | 0.657 | 18.6 | 5480 | 53700 |
| CFM CFM56-2B1 | turbofan | | C-135, RC-135 | 0.65 | 18.4 | 5540 | 54300 |
| GE CF34-10A | turbofan | | ARJ21 | 0.65 | 18.4 | 5540 | 54300 |
| CFE CFE738-1-1B | turbofan | 1990 | Falcon 2000 | 0.645 | 18.3 | 5580 | 54700 |
| RR BR710 | turbofan | 1995 | G. V/G550, Global Express | 0.64 | 18 | 5600 | 55000 |
| GE CF34-10E | turbofan | | E190/195 | 0.64 | 18 | 5600 | 55000 |
| General Electric CF6-50C2 | turbofan | | A300B2/B4/C4/F4, DC-10-30 | 0.63 | 17.8 | 5710 | 56000 |
| PowerJet SaM146 | turbofan | | Superjet LR | 0.629 | 17.8 | 5720 | 56100 |
| CFM CFM56-7B24 | turbofan | | 737 NG | 0.627 | 17.8 | 5740 | 56300 |
| RR BR715 | turbofan | 1997 | 717 | 0.62 | 17.6 | 5810 | 56900 |
| GE CF6-80C2-B1F | turbofan | | 747-400 | 0.605 | 17.1 | 5950 | 58400 |
| CFM CFM56-5A1 | turbofan | | A320 | 0.596 | 16.9 | 6040 | 59200 |
| Aviadvigatel PS-90A1 | turbofan | | Il-96-400 | 0.595 | 16.9 | 6050 | 59300 |
| PW PW2040 | turbofan | | 757-200 | 0.582 | 16.5 | 6190 | 60700 |
| PW PW4098 | turbofan | | 777-300 | 0.581 | 16.5 | 6200 | 60800 |
| GE CF6-80C2-B2 | turbofan | | 767 | 0.576 | 16.3 | 6250 | 61300 |
| IAE V2525-D5 | turbofan | | MD-90 | 0.574 | 16.3 | 6270 | 61500 |
| IAE V2533-A5 | turbofan | | A321-231 | 0.574 | 16.3 | 6270 | 61500 |
| RR Trent 700 | turbofan | 1992 | A330 | 0.562 | 15.9 | 6410 | 62800 |
| RR Trent 800 | turbofan | 1993 | 777-200/200ER/300 | 0.560 | 15.9 | 6430 | 63000 |
| Progress D-18T | turbofan | 1980 | An-124, An-225 | 0.546 | 15.5 | 6590 | 64700 |
| CFM CFM56-5B4 | turbofan | | A320-214 | 0.545 | 15.4 | 6610 | 64800 |
| CFM CFM56-5C2 | turbofan | | A340-211 | 0.545 | 15.4 | 6610 | 64800 |
| RR Trent 500 | turbofan | 1999 | A340-500/600 | 0.542 | 15.4 | 6640 | 65100 |
| CFM LEAP-1B | turbofan | 2014 | 737 MAX | 0.53-0.56 | 15–16 | 6400–6800 | 63000–67000 |
| Aviadvigatel PD-14 | turbofan | 2014 | MC-21-310 | 0.526 | 14.9 | 6840 | 67100 |
| RR Trent 900 | turbofan | 2003 | A380 | 0.522 | 14.8 | 6900 | 67600 |
| GE GE90-85B | turbofan | | 777-200/200ER | 0.52 | 14.7 | 6920 | 67900 |
| GE GEnx-1B76 | turbofan | 2006 | 787-10 | 0.512 | 14.5 | 7030 | 69000 |
| PW PW1400G | GTF | | MC-21 | 0.51 | 14.4 | 7100 | 69000 |
| CFM LEAP-1C | turbofan | 2013 | C919 | 0.51 | 14.4 | 7100 | 69000 |
| CFM LEAP-1A | turbofan | 2013 | A320neo family | 0.51 | 14.4 | 7100 | 69000 |
| RR Trent 7000 | turbofan | 2015 | A330neo | 0.506 (Note: 10% better than Trent 700) | 14.3 | 7110 | 69800 |
| RR Trent 1000 | turbofan | 2006 | 787 | 0.506 (Note: 10% better than Trent 700) | 14.3 | 7110 | 69800 |
| RR Trent XWB-97 | turbofan | 2014 | A350-1000 | 0.478 (Note: 15 per cent fuel consumption advantage over the original Trent engine) | 13.5 | 7530 | 73900 |
| PW 1127G | GTF | 2012 | A320neo | 0.463 | 13.1 | 7780 | 76300 |

=== Thrust-to-weight ratio ===
The thrust-to-weight ratio of jet engines with similar configurations varies with scale, but is mostly a function of engine construction technology. For a given engine, the lighter the engine, the better the thrust-to-weight is, the less fuel is used to compensate for drag due to the lift needed to carry the engine weight, or to accelerate the mass of the engine.

As can be seen in the following table, rocket engines generally achieve much higher thrust-to-weight ratios than duct engines such as turbojet and turbofan engines. This is primarily because rockets almost universally use dense liquid or solid reaction mass which gives a much smaller volume and hence the pressurization system that supplies the nozzle is much smaller and lighter for the same performance. Duct engines have to deal with air which is two to three orders of magnitude less dense and this gives pressures over much larger areas, which in turn results in more engineering materials being needed to hold the engine together and for the air compressor.

| Jet or rocket engine | Mass | | Thrust | | Thrust-to- weight ratio |
| Jet or rocket engine | (kg) | (lb) | (kN) | (lbf) | Thrust-to- weight ratio |
|---|---|---|---|---|---|
| RD-0410 nuclear rocket engine | 2,000 | 4,400 | 35.2 | 7,900 | 1.8 |
| J58 jet engine (SR-71 Blackbird) | 2,722 | 6,001 | 150 | 34,000 | 5.2 |
| Rolls-Royce/Snecma Olympus 593 turbojet with reheat (Concorde) | 3,175 | 7,000 | 169.2 | 38,000 | 5.4 |
| Pratt & Whitney F119 | 1,800 | 3,900 | 91 | 20,500 | 7.95 |
| RD-0750 rocket engine, three-propellant mode | 4,621 | 10,188 | 1,413 | 318,000 | 31.2 |
| RD-0146 rocket engine | 260 | 570 | 98 | 22,000 | 38.4 |
| Rocketdyne RS-25 rocket engine | 3,177 | 7,004 | 2,278 | 512,000 | 73.1 |
| RD-180 rocket engine | 5,393 | 11,890 | 4,152 | 933,000 | 78.5 |
| RD-170 rocket engine | 9,750 | 21,500 | 7,887 | 1,773,000 | 82.5 |
| F-1 (Saturn V first stage) | 8,391 | 18,499 | 7,740.5 | 1,740,100 | 94.1 |
| NK-33 rocket engine | 1,222 | 2,694 | 1,638 | 368,000 | 136.7 |
| Merlin 1D rocket engine, full-thrust version | 467 | 1,030 | 825 | 185,000 | 180.1 |

=== Comparison of types ===
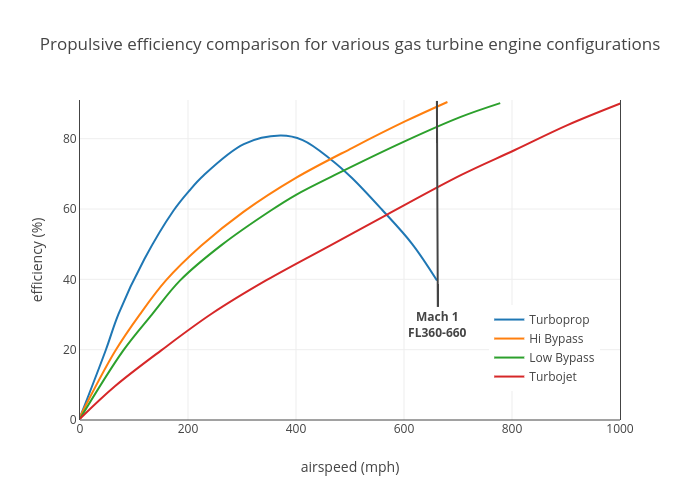
Propulsive efficiency comparison for various gas turbine engine configurations

Propeller engines handle larger air mass flows, and give them smaller acceleration, than jet engines. Since the increase in air speed is small, at high flight speeds the thrust available to propeller-driven aeroplanes is small. However, at low speeds, these engines benefit from relatively high propulsive efficiency.

On the other hand, turbojets accelerate a much smaller mass flow of intake air and burned fuel, but they then reject it at very high speed. When a de Laval nozzle is used to accelerate a hot engine exhaust, the outlet velocity may be locally supersonic. Turbojets are particularly suitable for aircraft travelling at very high speeds.

Turbofans have a mixed exhaust consisting of the bypass air and the hot combustion product gas from the core engine. The amount of air that bypasses the core engine compared to the amount flowing into the engine determines what is called a turbofan's bypass ratio (BPR).

While a turbojet engine uses all of the engine's output to produce thrust in the form of a hot high-velocity exhaust gas jet, a turbofan's cool low-velocity bypass air yields between 30% and 70% of the total thrust produced by a turbofan system.

The net thrust (F_{N}) generated by a turbofan can also be expanded as:

$$F_N = \dot{m}_e v_{he} - \dot{m}_o v_o + BPR\, (\dot{m}_c v_f)$$

where:

| ṁ_{e} | = the mass rate of hot combustion exhaust flow from the core engine |
| ṁ_{o} | = the mass rate of total air flow entering the turbofan = ṁ_{c} + ṁ_{f} |
| ṁ_{c} | = the mass rate of intake air that flows to the core engine |
| ṁ_{f} | = the mass rate of intake air that bypasses the core engine |
| v_{f} | = the velocity of the air flow bypassed around the core engine |
| v_{he} | = the velocity of the hot exhaust gas from the core engine |
| v_{o} | = the velocity of the total air intake = the true airspeed of the aircraft |
| BPR | = Bypass Ratio |

Rocket engines have extremely high exhaust velocity and thus are best suited for high speeds (hypersonic) and great altitudes. At any given throttle, the thrust and efficiency of a rocket motor improves slightly with increasing altitude (because the back-pressure falls thus increasing net thrust at the nozzle exit plane), whereas with a turbojet (or turbofan) the falling density of the air entering the intake (and the hot gases leaving the nozzle) causes the net thrust to decrease with increasing altitude. Rocket engines are more efficient than even scramjets above roughly Mach 15.

=== Altitude and speed ===
With the exception of scramjets, jet engines, deprived of their inlet systems can only accept air at around half the speed of sound. The inlet system's job for transonic and supersonic aircraft is to slow the air and perform some of the compression.

The limit on maximum altitude for engines is set by flammability – at very high altitudes the air becomes too thin to burn, or after compression, too hot. For turbojet engines altitudes of about 40 km appear to be possible, whereas for ramjet engines 55 km may be achievable. Scramjets may theoretically manage 75 km. Rocket engines of course have no upper limit.

At more modest altitudes, flying faster compresses the air at the front of the engine, and this greatly heats the air. The upper limit is usually thought to be about Mach 5–8, as above about Mach 5.5, the atmospheric nitrogen tends to react due to the high temperatures at the inlet and this consumes significant energy. The exception to this is scramjets which may be able to achieve about Mach 15 or more, as they avoid slowing the air, and rockets again have no particular speed limit.

=== Noise ===
The noise emitted by a jet engine has many sources. These include, in the case of gas turbine engines, the fan, compressor, combustor, turbine and propelling jet/s.

The propelling jet produces jet noise which is caused by the violent mixing action of the high speed jet with the surrounding air. In the subsonic case the noise is produced by eddies and in the supersonic case by Mach waves. The sound power radiated from a jet varies with the jet velocity raised to the eighth power for velocities up to 600 m/s (2,000 ft/s) and varies with the velocity cubed above 600 m/s (2,000 ft/s). Thus, the lower speed exhaust jets emitted from engines such as high bypass turbofans are the quietest, whereas the fastest jets, such as rockets, turbojets, and ramjets, are the loudest. For commercial jet aircraft the jet noise has reduced from the turbojet through bypass engines to turbofans as a result of a progressive reduction in propelling jet velocities. For example, the JT8D, a bypass engine, has a jet velocity of 400 m/s (1,450 ft/s) whereas the JT9D, a turbofan, has jet velocities of 300 m/s (885 ft/s) (cold) and 400 m/s (1,190 ft/s)(hot).

The advent of the turbofan replaced the very distinctive jet noise with another sound known as "buzz saw" noise. The origin is the shockwaves originating at the supersonic fan blade tip at takeoff thrust.

=== Cooling ===
Adequate heat transfer away from the working parts of the jet engine is critical to maintaining strength of engine materials and ensuring long life for the engine.

After 2016, research is ongoing in the development of transpiration cooling techniques to jet engine components.

== Operation ==
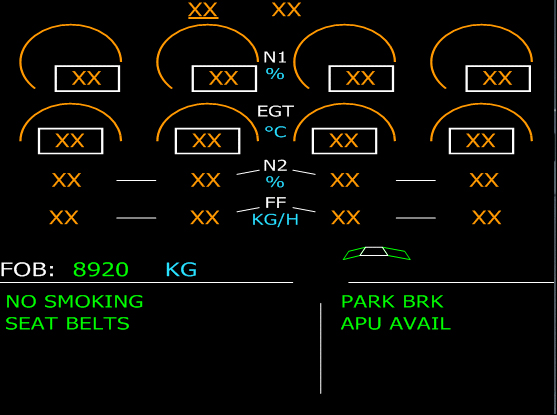
Airbus A340-300 Electronic centralised aircraft monitor (ECAM) Display

In a jet engine, each major rotating section usually has a separate gauge devoted to monitoring its speed of rotation. Depending on the make and model, a jet engine may have an N_{1} gauge that monitors the low-pressure compressor section and/or fan speed in turbofan engines. The gas generator section may be monitored by an N_{2} gauge, while triple spool engines may have an N_{3} gauge as well. Each engine section rotates at many thousands RPM. Their gauges therefore are calibrated in percent of a nominal speed rather than actual RPM, for ease of display and interpretation.

== See also ==
- Air turboramjet
- Air-augmented rocket
- Balancing machine
- Coandă-1910
- Components of jet engines
- Intake momentum drag
- Rocket engine nozzle
- Rocket turbine engine
- Spacecraft propulsion
- Stipa-Caproni
- Thrust reversal
- Turbojet development at the RAE
- Variable cycle engine
- Water injection (engine)
