= Aerospaceplane =

US Air Force study of winged spacecraft

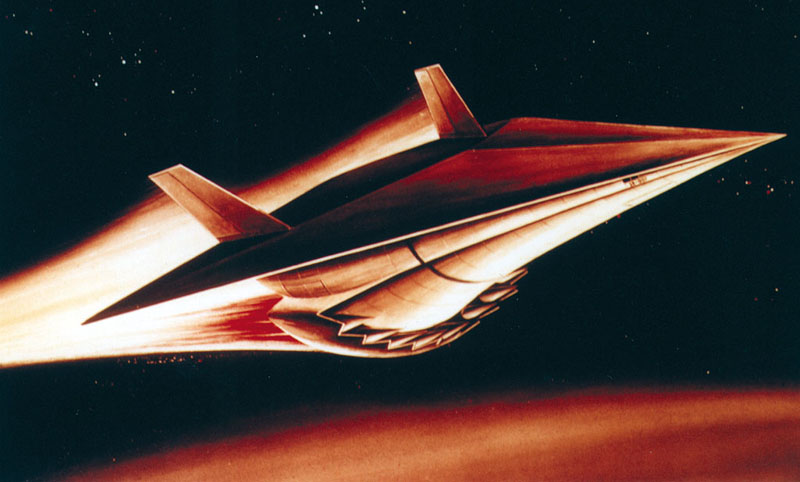
Aerospaceplane 1 (artist conception). Lab research showed that hydrogen-fueled airbreathers could be used for space launch.

The US Air Force's Aerospaceplane was a basic research project led by Weldon Worth at the Wright-Patterson AFB concerning the design of future recoverable spaceplanes. The effort was started in 1957 as a result of the USAF official SR-89774 ("SR" stands for "study requirement") for a reusable spaceplane. By 1959, this work was more known as the Recoverable Orbital Launch System (ROLS). It encompassed a variety of concepts, designs and research projects from 1958, but was cancelled as impractical in 1963.

== History ==
Initial propulsion concept was Liquid Air Collection System (LACES), for what is now known as liquid air cycle engine. Further work showed that more performance could be gained by extracting only the oxygen from the liquid air, a system they referred to as Air Collection and Enrichment System (ACES). A contract to develop an ACES testbed was placed with Marquardt and General Dynamics, with Garrett AiResearch building the heat exchanger for cooling the air. The ACES design was fairly complex; the air was first liquified in the heat exchanger cooled by liquid hydrogen fuel, then pumped into a low-pressure tank for short-term storage. From there it was then pumped into a high-pressure tank, where the oxygen was separated and the rest (mostly nitrogen) was dumped overboard. In late 1960 and early 1961, a 125 N demonstrator engine was being operated for up to 5 minutes at a time.

In early 1960, the Air Force offered a development contract to build a spaceplane with a crew of three that could take off from any runway and fly directly into orbit and return. They wanted the design to be in operation in 1970 for a total development cost of only $5 billion. Boeing, Douglas, Convair, Lockheed, Goodyear, North American, and Republic all responded. Most of these designs ignored the ACES system and instead used a scramjet for power. The scramjet had first been outlined at about the same time as the original LACES design in a NASA paper of 1958, and many companies were highly interested in seeing it develop, perhaps none more than Marquardt, whose ramjet business was dwindling with the introduction of newer jet engines and who had already started work on the scramjet. Both Alexander Kartveli and Antonio Ferri were proponents of the scramjet approach. Ferri eventually successfully demonstrated a scramjet producing net thrust in November 1964, producing 517 pounds-force (2.30 kN), about 80% of his goal.

In 1963, the Air Force changed their priorities in SR-651 and focused entirely on development of a variety of high-speed engines. Included were LACES and ACES engines, as well as scramjets, turboramjets and a "normal" (subsonic-combustion) ramjet with an intake suitable for use up to Mach 8. In October 1963, a review suggested that the basic concepts of the aerospaceplane were far too new for development of any real prototype. Moreover, the designs were all extremely sensitive to weight, and any increase (and there always is some) could result in all of the designs not working. The Aerospaceplane program was critiqued for involving "so many clearly infeasible factors" and exposing itself for "so much ridicule,” that the project's funding was wound down in 1964.
