= Precooled jet engine =

Turbomachinery concept

A precooled jet engine is a concept that enables jet engines with turbomachinery, as opposed to ramjets, to be used at high speeds. Precooling restores some or all of the performance degradation of the engine compressor (by preventing rotating stall/choking/reduced flow), as well as that of the complete gas generator (by maintaining a significant combustor temperature rise within a fixed turbine temperature limit), which would otherwise prevent flight with high ram temperatures.

== History ==
Robert P. Carmichael in 1955 devised several engine cycles that used liquid hydrogen to precool the inlet air to the engine before using it as fuel.

Interest in precooled engines saw an emergence in the UK in 1982, when Alan Bond created a precooled air breathing rocket engine design he called SATAN. The idea was developed as part of the HOTOL SSTO spaceplane project, and became the Rolls-Royce RB545. In 1989, after the HOTOL project was discontinued, some of the RB545 engineers created a company, Reaction Engines Ltd, to develop the idea into the SABRE engine, and the associated Skylon spaceplane.

In 1987, N Tanatsugu published "Analytical Study of Space Plane Powered by Air-Turbo Ramjet with Intake Air Cooler", part of Japan's ISAS (now JAXA) study into an air-turbo ramjet intended to power the first stage of a TSTO spaceplane. The ramjet, ATR, later became ATREX after the addition of an expander cycle, and was superseded by the preecooled turbojet (PCTJ) and hypersonic turbojet studies. A liquid nitrogen precooled hydrogen burning test engine was flown at Mach 2 at Taiki Aerospace Research Field in September 2010.

== Design ==
For higher flight speeds, precooling may feature a cryogenic fuel-cooled heat exchanger before the air enters the compressor. After gaining heat and vapourising in the heat exchanger, the fuel (e.g. H_{2}) burns in the combustor. Precooling using a heat exchanger has not been used in flight, but is predicted to have significantly high thrust and efficiency at speeds up to Mach 5.5. Precooled jet engine cycles were analyzed by Robert P. Carmichael in 1955. Precooled engines avoid the need for an air condenser because, unlike liquid air cycle engines (LACE), precooled engines cool the air without liquefying it.

For lower flight speeds precooling can be done with mass injection, known as WIPCC (water injection precompressor cooling) This method has been used for short duration (due to limited coolant capacity) increases to an aircraft's normal maximum speed. "Operation Skyburner", which gained a world speed record with a McDonnell Douglas F-4 Phantom II, and the Mikoyan Ye-266 (Mig 25) both used a water/alcohol spray to cool the air ahead of the compressor.

Precooling (as well as combustion chamber water injection) is used at the lowest flight speeds, i.e. during take off, to increase thrust at high ambient temperatures.

== Characteristics ==
One main advantage of pre-cooling is (as predicted by the ideal gas law) for a given overall pressure ratio, there is a significant reduction in compressor delivery temperature (T3), which delays reaching the T3 limit to a higher Mach number. Consequently, sea-level conditions (corrected flow) can be maintained after the pre-cooler over a very wide range of flight speeds, thus maximizing net thrust even at high speeds. The compressor and ducting after the inlet is subject to much lower and more consistent temperatures, and hence may be made of light alloys. This reduces the weight of the engine, which further improves the thrust/weight ratio.

Hydrogen is a suitable fuel because it is liquid at deeply cryogenic temperatures, and over its useful range has a very high total specific heat capacity, including the latent heat of vapourisation, higher than water. However, the low density of liquid hydrogen has negative effects on the rest of the vehicle, and the vehicle physically becomes very large, although the weight on the undercarriage and wing loading may remain low.

Hydrogen causes structural weakening in many materials, known as hydrogen embrittlement.

The weight of the precooler adds to the weight of the engine, thereby reducing its thrust to weight ratio. Passing the intake air through the precooler adds to the inlet drag, thereby reducing the engine net thrust, and so reducing the thrust to weight ratio.

Depending on the amount of cooling required, despite its high thermal capacity, more hydrogen may be needed to cool the air than can be burnt with the cooled air. In some cases, part of the excess hydrogen can be burnt in a ramjet with uncooled air to reduce this inefficiency.

Unlike a LACE engine, a precooled engine does not need to liquefy the oxygen, so the amount of cooling is reduced as there is no need to cover of fusion of the oxygen and a smaller total temperature drop is required. This in turn reduces the amount of hydrogen used as a heat-sink, but unable to be burnt. In addition a condenser isn't required, giving a weight saving.

== See also ==
- Air turborocket
- Compressor map
- Hydrogen-cooled turbo generator
- Intercooler
