= Rocket turbine engine =

A rocket turbine engine is a combination of two types of propulsion engines: a liquid-propellant rocket and a turbine jet engine. Its power-to-weight ratio is a little higher than a regular jet engine, and works at higher altitudes.

== See also ==
- Index of aviation articles
- Air turboramjet
