= Intake momentum drag =

Aerodynamic phenomenon

Intake momentum drag is an aerodynamic phenomenon which affects turboprop and jet-powered aircraft.

== Causes ==
Intake momentum drag is caused by the consequence of the speed of the air entering the engine increasing, but where the exit speed of the air from the engine remains constant. The outcome therefore is that the amount by which the engine increases air velocity, ostensibly by way of the compression process, is reduced. A repercussion of this causes a slight reduction in the thrust of a jet engine.

=== Intake momentum drag yaw ===
Intake momentum drag yaw is a further consequence of intake momentum drag which affects V/STOL (vertical and/or short take-off and landing) aircraft such as the Hawker Siddeley Harrier.

Intake momentum drag yaw is an aspect in which the mass of air ingested by the intake of the engine, whilst the aircraft is in the hover during a crosswind, can result in a state of uncontrolled roll (a secondary aerodynamic effect of yaw).

The phenomenon was identified during the test flying programme for the Harrier and which required precise investigation. This resulted in test pilot John Farley deliberately flying right into the edge of this condition repeatedly, so that a system to counteract the effect could be developed.
