= Air turborocket =

Type of combined-cycle jet engine

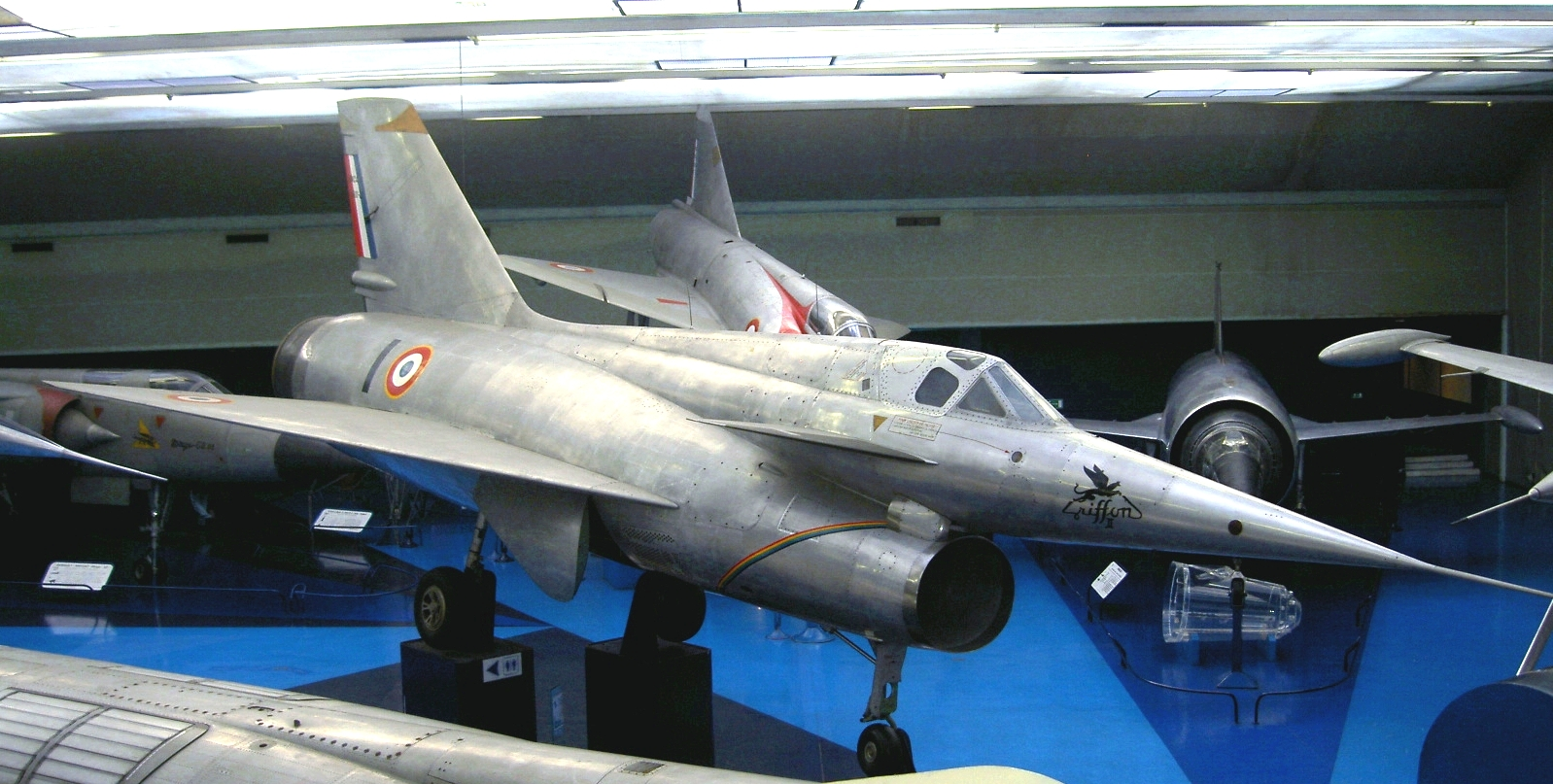
Nord 1500 Griffon II, which was powered by a turbojet–ramjet combination, a precursor to later turborocket designs

The air turborocket is a form of combined-cycle jet engine. The basic layout includes a gas generator, which produces high pressure gas, that drives a turbine/compressor assembly which compresses atmospheric air into a combustion chamber. This mixture is then combusted before leaving the device through a nozzle and creating thrust.

There are many different types of air turborockets. The various types generally differ in how the gas generator section of the engine functions.

Air turborockets are often referred to as turboramjets, turboramjet rockets, turborocket expanders, and many others. As there is no consensus on which names apply to which specific concepts, various sources may use the same name for two different concepts.

== Benefits ==
The benefit of this setup is increased specific impulse over that of a rocket. For the same carried mass of propellant as a rocket motor, the overall output of the air turborocket is much higher. In addition, it provides thrust throughout a much wider speed range than a ramjet, yet is much cheaper and easier to control than a gas turbine engine. The air turborocket fills a niche (in terms of cost, reliability, ruggedness, and duration of thrust) between the solid-fuel rocket motor and gas turbine engine for missile applications.

== Types ==
=== Turborocket ===
A turborocket is a type of aircraft engine combining elements of a jet engine and a rocket. It typically comprises a multi-stage fan driven by a turbine, which is driven by the hot gases exhausting from a series of small rocket-like motors mounted around the turbine inlet. The turbine exhaust gases mix with the fan discharge air, and combust with the air from the compressor before exhausting through a convergent-divergent propelling nozzle.

==== Background ====
Once a jet engine goes high enough in an atmosphere, there is insufficient oxygen to burn the jet fuel. The idea behind a turborocket is to supplement the atmospheric oxygen with an onboard supply. This allows operation at a much higher altitude than a normal engine would allow.

The turborocket design offers a mixture of benefits with drawbacks. It is not a true rocket, so it cannot operate in space. Cooling the engine is not a problem because the burner and its hot exhaust gases are located behind the turbine blades.

=== Air turboramjet ===
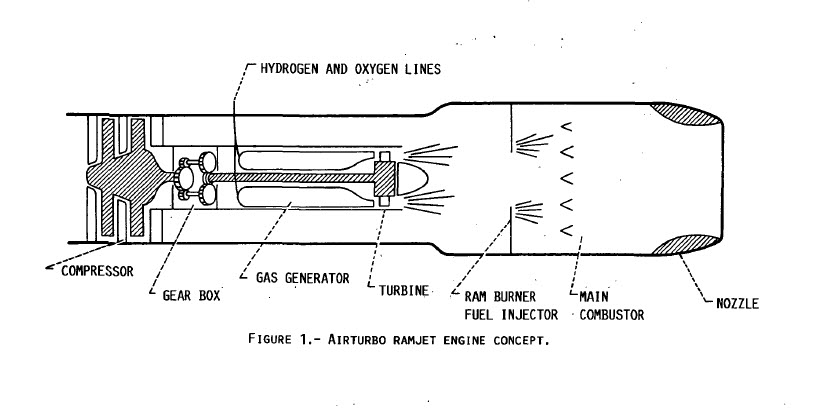
Original schematic of a turboramjet design

Recreated schematic of an air turboramjet, featuring; 1. compressor, 2. gearbox, 3. hydrogen and oxygen lines, 4. gas generator, 5. turbine, 6. ram burner fuel injector, 7. main combustor, 8. nozzle

The air turboramjet engine is a combined cycle engine that merges aspects of turbojet and ramjet engines. The turboramjet is a hybrid engine that essentially consists of a turbojet mounted inside a ramjet. The turbojet core is mounted inside a duct that contains a combustion chamber downstream of the turbojet nozzle. The turboramjet can be run in turbojet mode at takeoff and during low-speed flight but then switch to ramjet mode to accelerate to high Mach numbers.

The operation of the engine is controlled using bypass flaps located just downstream of the diffuser. During low-speed flight, controllable flaps close the bypass duct and force air directly into the compressor section of the turbojet. During high-speed flight, the flaps block the flow into the turbojet, and the engine operates like a ramjet using the aft combustion chamber to produce thrust. The engine would start out operating as a turbojet during takeoff and while climbing to altitude. Upon reaching high subsonic speed, the portion of the engine downstream of the turbojet would be used as an afterburner to accelerate the plane above the speed of sound.

At lower speeds, air passes through an inlet and is then compressed by an axial compressor. That compressor is driven by a turbine, which is powered by hot, high-pressure gas from a combustion chamber. These initial aspects are very similar to how a turbojet operates, however, there are several differences. The first is that the combustor in the turboramjet is often separate from the main airflow. Instead of combining air from the compressor with fuel to combust, the turboramjet combustor may use hydrogen and oxygen, carried on the aircraft, as its fuel for the combustor.

The air compressed by the compressor bypasses the combustor and turbine section of the engine, where it is mixed with the turbine exhaust. The turbine exhaust can be designed to be fuel-rich (i.e., the combustor does not burn all the fuel) which, when mixed with the compressed air, creates a hot fuel-air mixture which is ready to burn again. More fuel is injected into this air where it is again combusted. The exhaust is ejected through a propelling nozzle, generating thrust.

Picture shown lacks required bypass ducting around the compressor for ramjet operation. Shown is a low bypass turbojet with re-heat.

=== Conditions for usage of turboramjet ===
The turboramjet engine is used when space is constrained, as it takes up less space than separate ramjet and turbojet engines. Since a ramjet must already be traveling at high speeds before it will start working, a ramjet-powered aircraft is incapable of taking off from a runway under its own power; that is the advantage of the turbojet, which is a member of the gas turbine family of engines. A turbojet does not rely purely on the motion of the engine to compress the incoming air flow; instead, the turbojet contains some additional rotating machinery that compresses incoming air and allows the engine to function during takeoff and at slow speeds. For flow between Mach 3 and 3.5 during cruise flight, speeds at which the turbojet could not function because of the temperature limitations of its turbine blades, this design provides the ability to operate from zero speed to over Mach 3 using the best features of both the turbojet and ramjet combined into a single engine.

== Air turborocket vs. standard rocket motor ==
In applications which stay relatively in the atmosphere and require longer durations of lower thrust over a specific speed range the air turborocket can have a weight advantage over the standard solid fuel rocket motor. In terms of volumetric requirements, the rocket motor has the advantage due to the lack of inlet ducts and other air management devices.

== See also ==
- Index of aviation articles
- Pratt & Whitney J58
- Brandner E-300
- ATREX
- SABRE (rocket engine)
- LACE separates oxygen from the air
- Air-augmented rocket normally uses some external air, but can operate without it
- Rocket engine uses no external air
- Turbojet uses the combustion products with the air to drive the turbine
- Ramjet needs no turbine for a compressor
