= Air-augmented rocket =

Rockets that use supersonic exhaust to create additional acceleration

Air-augmented rockets use the supersonic exhaust of some kind of rocket engine to further compress air collected by ram effect during flight to use as additional working mass, leading to greater effective thrust for any given amount of fuel than either the rocket or a ramjet alone.

It represents a hybrid class of rocket/ramjet engines, similar to a ramjet, but able to give useful thrust from zero speed, and is also able in some cases to operate outside the atmosphere, with fuel efficiency similar or better than a comparable ramjet or rocket at every point.

There are a wide variety of variations on the basic concept, and a wide variety of resulting names. Those that burn additional fuel downstream of the rocket are generally known as ramrockets, rocket-ejector, integral rocket/ramjets or ejector ramjets, whilst those that do not include additional burning are known as ducted rockets or shrouded rockets depending on the details of the expander.

== Operation ==
In a conventional chemical rocket engine, the rocket carries both its fuel and oxidizer in its fuselage. The chemical reaction between the fuel and the oxidizer produces reactant products which are nominally gases at the pressures and temperatures in the rocket's combustion chamber. The reaction is also highly energetic (exothermic) releasing tremendous energy in the form of heat; that is imparted to the reactant products in the combustion chamber giving this mass enormous internal energy which, when expanded through a nozzle is capable of producing very high exhaust velocities. The exhaust is directed rearward through the nozzle, thereby producing a thrust forward.

In this conventional design, the fuel/oxidizer mixture is both the working mass and energy source that accelerates it. It is easy to demonstrate that the best performance is had if the working mass has the lowest molecular weight possible. Hydrogen, by itself, is the theoretical best rocket fuel. Mixing this with oxygen in order to burn it lowers the overall performance of the system by raising the mass of the exhaust, as well as greatly increasing the mass that has to be carried aloft – oxygen is much heavier than hydrogen.

One potential method of increasing the overall performance of the system is to collect either the fuel or the oxidizer during flight. Fuel is hard to come by in the atmosphere, but oxidizer in the form of gaseous oxygen makes up to 20% of the air. There are a number of designs that take advantage of this fact. These sorts of systems have been explored in the liquid air cycle engine (LACE).

Another idea is to collect the working mass. With an air-augmented rocket, an otherwise conventional rocket engine is mounted in the center of a long tube, open at the front. As the rocket moves through the atmosphere the air enters the front of the tube, where it is compressed via the ram effect. As it travels down the tube it is further compressed and mixed with the fuel-rich exhaust from the rocket engine, which heats the air much as a combustor would in a ramjet. In this way a fairly small rocket can be used to accelerate a much larger working mass than normal, leading to significantly higher thrust within the atmosphere.

=== Advantages ===
The effectiveness of this simple method can be dramatic. Typical solid rockets have a specific impulse of about 260 seconds (2.5 kN·s/kg), but using the same fuel in an air-augmented design can improve this to over 500 seconds (4.9 kN·s/kg), a figure unmatched even by high specific impulse hydrolox engines. This design can even be slightly more efficient than a ramjet, as the exhaust from the rocket engine helps compress the air more than a ramjet normally would; this raises the combustion efficiency as a longer, more efficient nozzle can be employed. Another advantage is that the rocket works even at zero forward speed, whereas a ramjet requires forward motion to feed air into the engine.

=== Disadvantages ===
It might be envisaged that such an increase in performance would be widely deployed, but various issues frequently preclude this. The intakes of high-speed engines are difficult to design, and require careful positioning on the airframe in order to achieve reasonable performance – in general, the entire airframe needs to be built around the intake design. Another problem is that the air thins out as the rocket climbs. Hence, the amount of additional thrust is limited by how fast the rocket climbs. Finally, the air ducting adds quite a bit of weight which slows the vehicle considerably towards the end of the burn.

== Variations ==
=== Shrouded rocket ===
The simplest version of an air-augmentation system is found in the shrouded rocket. This consists largely of a rocket motor or motors positioned in a duct. The rocket exhaust entrains the air, pulling it through the duct, while also mixing with it and heating it, causing the pressure to increase downstream of the rocket. The resulting hot gas is then further expanded through an expanding nozzle.

=== Ducted rocket ===
A slight variation on the shrouded rocket, the ducted rocket adds only a convergent-divergent nozzle. This ensures the combustion takes place at subsonic speeds, improving the range of vehicle speeds where the system remains useful.

=== Ejector ramjet (et al) ===
The ejector ramjet is a more complex system with potentially higher performance. Like the shrouded and ducted rocket, the system begins with a rocket engine(s) in an air intake. It differs in that the mixed exhaust enters a diffuser, slowing the speed of the airflow to subsonic speeds. Additional fuel is then injected, burning in this expanded section. The exhaust of that combustion then enters a convergent-divergent nozzle as in a conventional ramjet, or the ducted rocket case.

== History ==
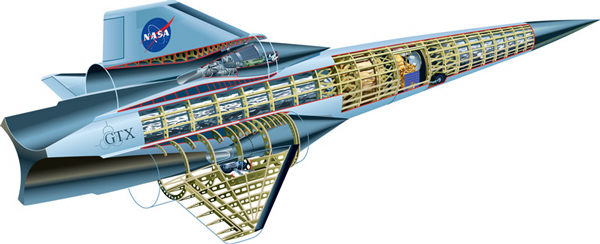
NASA GTX reference vehicle

The first serious attempt to make a production air-augmented rocket was the Soviet Gnom rocket design, implemented by Decree 708-336 of the Soviet Ministers of 2 July 1958.

More recently, about 2002, NASA has re-examined similar technology for the GTX program as part of an effort to develop SSTO spacecraft.

Air-augmented rockets finally entered mass production in 2016 when the Meteor air-to-air missile was introduced into service.

== See also ==
- Index of aviation articles
- Liquid air cycle engine – collecting oxidizer instead of working mass
- Air turborocket
- SABRE (rocket engine)
- List of missiles using ramjets
