= Liquid air cycle engine =

Concept of hybrid atmospheric jet engine

A liquid air cycle engine (LACE) is a type of spacecraft propulsion engine that attempts to increase its efficiency by gathering part of its oxidizer from the atmosphere. A liquid air cycle engine uses liquid hydrogen (LH2) fuel to liquefy the air.

In a liquid oxygen/liquid hydrogen rocket, the liquid oxygen (LOX) needed for combustion is the majority of the weight of the spacecraft on lift-off, so if some of this can be collected from the air on the way, it might dramatically lower the take-off weight of the spacecraft.

LACE was studied to some extent in the USA during the late 1950s and early 1960s, and by late 1960 Marquardt had a testbed system running, it labelled an ejector engine. However, as NASA moved to ballistic capsules during Project Mercury, funding for research into winged vehicles slowly disappeared, and LACE work along with it. In the 90s interest in Rocket-based combined cycle engines was revised, and tested on the NASA X-43 series.

LACE was also the basis of the engines on the British Aerospace HOTOL design of the 1980s.

== Principle of operation ==
Conceptually, LACE works by compressing and then quickly liquefying the air. Compression is achieved through the ram-air effect in an intake similar to that found on a high-speed aircraft like Concorde, where intake ramps create shock waves that compress the air. The LACE design then blows the compressed air over a heat exchanger, in which the liquid hydrogen fuel is flowing. This rapidly cools the air, and the various constituents quickly liquefy. By careful mechanical arrangement the liquid oxygen can be removed from the other parts of the air, notably water, nitrogen and carbon dioxide, at which point the liquid oxygen can be fed into the engine as usual. It will be seen that heat-exchanger limitations always cause this system to run with a hydrogen/air ratio much richer than stoichiometric with a consequent penalty in performance and thus some hydrogen is dumped overboard.

== Advantages and disadvantages ==
The use of a winged launch vehicle allows using lift rather than thrust to overcome gravity, which greatly reduces gravity losses. On the other hand, the reduced gravity losses come at the price of much higher aerodynamic drag and aerodynamic heating due to the need to stay much deeper within the atmosphere than a pure rocket would during the boost phase.

In order to appreciably reduce the mass of the oxygen carried at launch, a LACE vehicle needs to spend more time in the lower atmosphere to collect enough oxygen to supply the engines during the remainder of the launch. This leads to greatly increased vehicle heating and drag losses, which therefore increases fuel consumption to offset the drag losses and the additional mass of the thermal protection system. This increased fuel consumption offsets somewhat the savings in oxidizer mass; these losses are in turn offset by the higher specific impulse, I_{sp}, of the air-breathing engine. Thus, the engineering trade-offs involved are quite complex, and highly sensitive to the design assumptions made.

Other issues are introduced by the relative material and logistical properties of LOx versus LH_{2}. LOx is quite cheap; LH_{2} is nearly two orders of magnitude more expensive. LOx is dense (1.141 kg/L), whereas LH_{2} has a very low density (0.0678 kg/L) and is therefore very bulky. (The extreme bulkiness of the LH2 tankage tends to increase vehicle drag by increasing the vehicle's frontal area.) Finally, LOx tanks are relatively lightweight and fairly cheap, while the deep cryogenic nature and extreme physical properties of LH_{2} mandate that LH_{2} tanks and plumbing must be large and use heavy, expensive, exotic materials and insulation. Hence, much as the costs of using LH_{2} rather than a hydrocarbon fuel may well outweigh the I_{sp} benefit of using LH_{2} in a single-stage-to-orbit rocket, the costs of using more LH_{2} as a propellant and air-liquefaction coolant in LACE may well outweigh the benefits gained by not needing to carry as much LOx on board.

Most significantly, the LACE system is far heavier than a pure rocket engine having the same thrust (air-breathing engines of almost all types have relatively poor thrust-to-weight ratios compared to rockets), and the performance of launch vehicles of all types is particularly affected by increases in vehicle dry mass (such as engines) that must be carried all the way to orbit, as opposed to oxidizer mass that would be burnt off over the course of the flight. Moreover, the lower thrust-to-weight ratio of an air-breathing engine as compared to a rocket significantly decreases the launch vehicle's maximum possible acceleration, and increases gravity losses since more time must be spent to accelerate to orbital velocity. Also, the higher inlet and airframe drag losses of a lifting, air-breathing vehicle launch trajectory as compared to a pure rocket on a ballistic launch trajectory introduces an additional penalty term $\frac {1} {1 + \frac {gD} {aL}}$ into the rocket equation known as the air-breather's burden. This term implies that unless the lift-to-drag ratio (L/D) and the acceleration of the vehicle as compared to gravity (a/g) are both implausibly large for a hypersonic air-breathing vehicle, the advantages of the higher I_{sp} of the air-breathing engine and the savings in LOx mass are largely lost.

Thus, the advantages, or disadvantages, of the LACE design continue to be a matter of some debate.

== History ==
LACE was studied to some extent in the United States of America during the late 1950s and early 1960s, where it was seen as a "natural" fit for a winged spacecraft project known as the Aerospaceplane. At the time the concept was known as LACES, for Liquid Air Collection Engine System. The liquified air and some of the hydrogen is then pumped directly into the engine for burning.

When it was demonstrated that it was relatively easy to separate the oxygen from the other components of air, mostly nitrogen and carbon dioxide, a new concept emerged as ACES for Air Collection and Enrichment System. This leaves the problem of what to do with the leftover gasses. ACES injected the nitrogen into a ramjet engine, using it as additional working fluid while the engine was running on air and the liquid oxygen was being stored. As the aircraft climbed and the atmosphere thinned, the lack of air was offset by increasing the flow of oxygen from the tanks. This makes ACES an ejector ramjet (or ramrocket) as opposed to the pure rocket LACE design.

Both Marquardt Corporation and General Dynamics were involved in the LACES research. However, as NASA moved to ballistic capsules during Project Mercury, funding for research into winged vehicles slowly disappeared, and ACES along with it.

== See also ==
- Air-augmented rocket
- RB545
- Reaction Engines SABRE - a precooled jet engine that cools but does not liquefy the air
- Scramjet
