= ATREX =

The ATREX engine (Air Turbo Ramjet Engine with eXpander cycle) developed in Japan is an experimental precooled jet engine that works as a turbojet at low speeds and a ramjet up to mach 6.0.

ATREX uses liquid hydrogen fuel in a fairly exotic single-fan arrangement. The liquid hydrogen fuel is pumped through a heat exchanger in the air-intake, simultaneously heating the liquid hydrogen and cooling the incoming air. This cooling of the incoming air is critical in achieving a reasonable efficiency. The hydrogen then continues through a second heat exchanger positioned after the combustion section, where the hot exhaust is used to further heat the hydrogen, turning it in a very high pressure gas. This gas is then passed through the tips of the fan, providing it with driving power at subsonic speeds. After mixing with the air, the hydrogen is burned in the combustion chamber.

The development of this engine lost focus in favor of the new hypersonic precooled turbojet engine (PCTJ).

== See also ==
- RB545
- Skylon
