= Black Horse (rocket) =

The Black Horse was a study concept for a proposed winged spaceplane that would use aerial refueling to greatly reduce the size of the spacecraft, to about the size of an F-16 Fighting Falcon. The original concept was proposed in 1993 by US Air Force Captain Mitchell Burnside Clapp, who was familiar with the Air Force's use of aerial refueling to extend the performance of combat aircraft. The concept was further developed by others, including a smaller concept developed by Robert Zubrin, named the Black Colt. Clapp left the Air Force in 1996 and partnered with Zubrin to form Pioneer Rocketplane, who proposed a slightly larger version known as Pathfinder.

== Black Horse Development ==
Clapp proposed Black Horse as a solution to the Air Force's ongoing TransAtmospheric Vehicle (TAV) mission. The concept was picked up by the Phillips Laboratory, and over the winter of 1993-94 they carried out a six-week study with WJ Schafer Associates and Conceptual Research Corporation (an aircraft design firm) into what was now known as the Aerial Propellant Transfer (APT) concept. APT was based on using as many off-the-shelf components as possible and considered a wide variety of possible propellants. Wishing to use only non-cryogenic fuels, they favored the use of conventional JP-5 jet fuel with hydrogen peroxide as the oxidizer. Other mixes considered, mostly for comparison purposes, were liquid hydrogen (LH2) and liquid oxygen (LOX), methane/LOX, and RP-1/LOX. Although the performance of the alternate fuels was higher, they all included at least one cryogenic component and were much less dense. Using peroxide had the additional advantage of cooling the combustion, which allowed the use of conventional JP-5 rather than the more expensive RP-1.

The study demonstrated that Black Horse would outperform any vertical take-off/horizontal landing concept no matter what fuel it used. The study also noted that the speed that the aerial fuel transfer took place was a key input to the overall performance of the system. Black Horse was deliberately designed to use existing tanker aircraft, specifically the KC-135Q and T models, which had fuel tanks completely separate from the aircraft's own fuel system (most models allowed the 135's engines to draw from the tanks). However, performance was slightly increased if the transfer took place in the supersonic regime at Mach 3.0, and dramatically increased, almost doubled, if it was hypersonic at Mach 5.5.

== Black Colt ==
The concept was also picked up by Zubrin, who was then working at Martin Marietta, who carried out their own design series from January to May 1994. This developed the smaller Black Colt concept. Clapp and Zubrin later wrote an extensive article on the concepts in the June 1995 edition of Analog magazine. The Black Colt would take off with a tank of fuel, but load oxidizer while in the air. Zubrin considered the Black Colt to be a more feasible concept, as it would fly at a much lower speed.

Clapp partnered with Zubrin to form Pioneer Rocketplane, who proposed a slightly larger version known as Pathfinder.

== Rocketplane XS ==
A similar launcher, Rocketplane XS, has been proposed by Rocketplane Global Inc.

== See also ==
- List of space launch system designs
