= Pioneer Rocketplane =

Former aerospace company

- Type: Private
- Industry: Aerospace and defense
- Founded: 1996
- Headquarters: Solvang, California, United States
- Key people: Mitchell Burnside Clapp, Founder, Craig Dickman CEO/President
- Products: Suborbital spacecraft Space systems
- Number of employees: 0 (1/1/05)

Pioneer Rocketplane was an American aerospace design and development company intent on developing affordable crewed space flight. Based in Solvang, California, its projects included Rocketplane XP, a four-seat spacecraft, and the Pathfinder, which used aerial refuelling shortly after take-off.

The company still exists, but is no longer in operation. Pioneer's intellectual property is now owned by Rocketplane Limited, Inc., however Rocketplane Limited does not employ any of the principals of Pioneer Rocketplane.

== History ==
=== The "Black Horse" study ===
The "Black Horse" study began with a bar napkin at the White Sands Missile Range Officers’ Club on May 12, 1993. The original concept was developed by then Air Force Captain Mitchell Burnside Clapp, who envisioned an aerial refueled, rocket-powered single-stage to orbit (SSTO) vehicle using jet fuel and hydrogen peroxide. This concept seemed a natural match for the Air Force's TransAtmospheric Vehicle (TAV) mission and studies began at the USAF Phillips Laboratory. Aerospace engineering legend Burt Rutan and noted aircraft designer Dan Raymer contributed input to the development of the design.

=== The private sector ===
Mitchell Burnside Clapp left the Air Force in 1996. Teaming up with Robert Zubrin and promoter Charles Lauer, he founded Pioneer Rocketplane. To help the new company get started, it allied with Dr. Zubrin's research company, Pioneer Astronautics, in Lakewood, Colorado. General Tony McPeak, now retired from the Air Force, joined the company as chairman of the board. During this time Pioneer Rocketplane refined the concept for the Pathfinder rocketplane. It had to require no new engine developments, which would postpone the first flight by years. It had to be built by subcontractors to avoid the time and expense of building an in-house manufacturing capability. Most importantly, it must be able to support the requirements for the new low Earth orbit communications satellites. This led to the switch from hydrogen peroxide to liquid oxygen as the preferred oxidizer, and drove an increase in overall size.

Version 2.0 of the Pathfinder concept was delivered in 1997 by Conceptual Research Corporation.

In 1999, CEO Mitchell Burnside Clapp testified before the United States House Committee on Science, Space, and Technology that he government assistance would be critical to the commercial success of the reusable launch vehicles.

=== Rocketplane Limited ===
In 2001, Rocketplane Limited, Inc. was formed. Pioneer Rocketplane is a part owner of Rocketplane Limited, but ceased operations as an independent company. Rocketplane Limited purchased the intellectual property of Pioneer and put in place an all new management and engineering team to push the development of the Rocketplane XP. In 2006, it acquired Kistler Aerospace.
