= Airbus Defence and Space Spaceplane =

2007 suborbital spaceplane concept

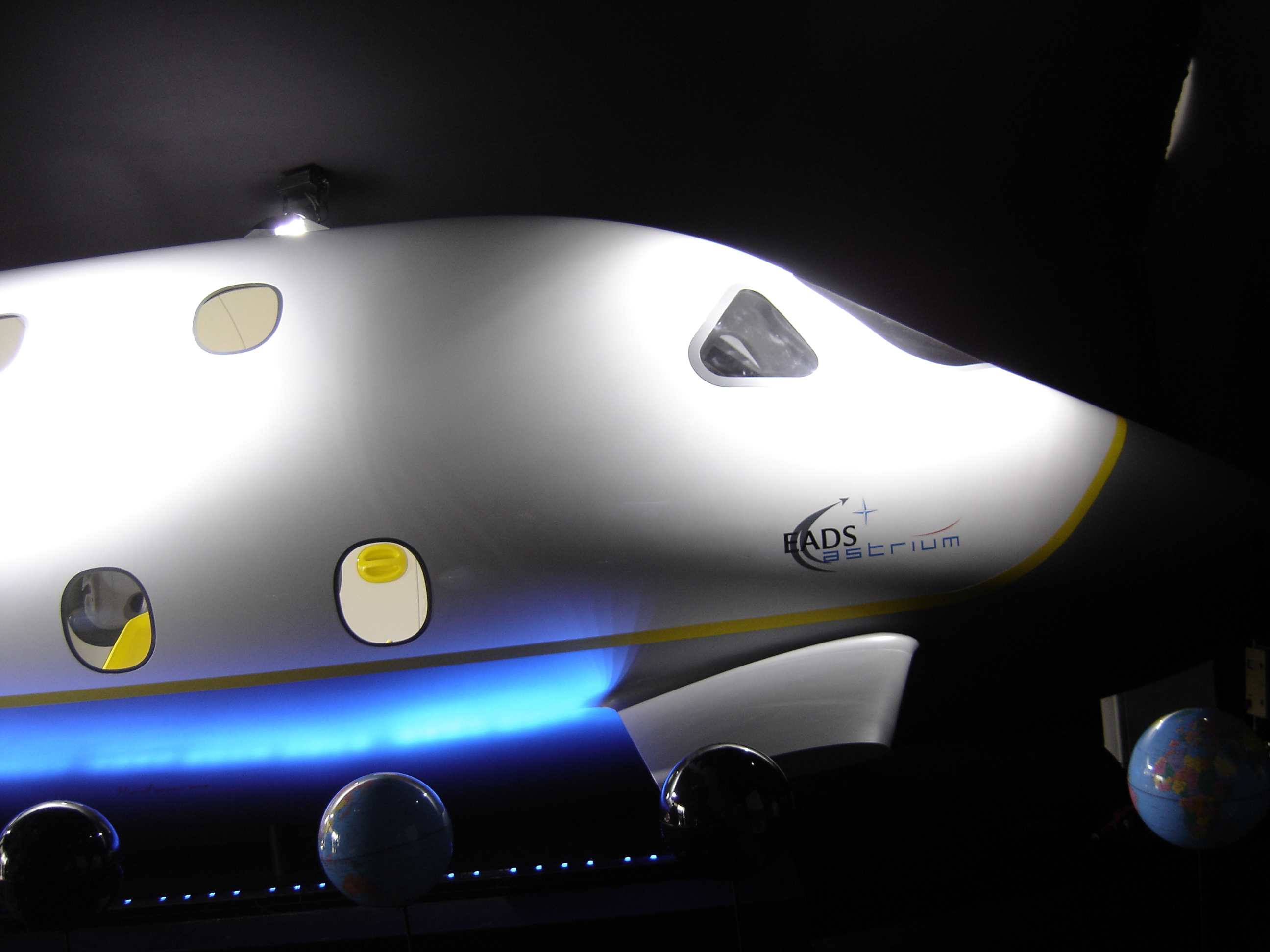
Mock-up of the vehicle at Paris Air Show 2007

The Airbus Defence and Space Spaceplane, also called EADS Astrium TBN according to some sources, is a suborbital spaceplane concept for carrying space tourists, proposed by EADS Astrium (currently Airbus Defence and Space), the space subsidiary of the European consortium EADS (currently Airbus). A full-size mockup was officially unveiled in Paris, France, on June 13, 2007, and is now on display in the Concorde hall of the Musée de l'Air et de l'Espace. The project is the first space tourism entry by a major aerospace contractor.

It is a rocket plane with a large wingspan, straight rearwards wing and a pair of canards. Propulsion is ensured by classical turbofan jet engines for the atmospheric phase and a methane-oxygen rocket engine for the space tourism phase. It can carry a pilot and four passengers. The dimensions and looks are somewhat similar to those of a business jet.

As of 2007, EADS Astrium hoped to start development of this rocket plane by 2008, with the objective of a first flight in 2011. There was also a possibility that the Tunisian area of Tozeur might be used for the initial flights. Demonstrator test flight regarding conditions encountered in the end-of-flight phase of a return from space occurred on June 5, 2014.

As of 2015, EADS Astrium was waiting for investors.

== Origin of the project ==
The origin of the project is a proposal by a group of young French, German, British and Spanish engineers from EADS Astrium. It was studied in great secrecy for two years and finally approved by the chairman of EADS Astrium, François Auque. The design is similar in concept to the Rocketplane XP. They looked at the main concepts under development and their studies showed that Rocketplane's jet and rocket combination made the most sense.

In the following months, a core team came up with a detailed concept and assembled the required expertise from different areas of Astrium and other EADS subsidiaries, such as Socata, as well as several external industry partners. Australian designer Marc Newson, who earned his reputation in the field of aviation as Creative Director of Qantas, was also invited to join the project.

== Flight profile ==
Turbofan propulsion Rocket propulsion No propulsion A: Ignition of rocket engine followed by turbofan shutdown B: Shutdown of rocket engine. Acceleration 3 g. Start of weightlessness phase. C: Culmination D: Beginning of atmospheric deceleration. Max acceleration 4.5 g. E: Turbofan ignition. Transition to aeronautical mode.

After takeoff the plane reaches an altitude of 12 km. This classical aeronautical phase can last for 45 minutes. The pilot shuts down the jets and starts the methane oxygen rocket engine at the rear of the vehicle. The plane then raises along a vertical trajectory. For 90 seconds of flight with a top speed of Mach 3, the plane is rocketed upwards. The maximum acceleration is 3 g (30 m/s^{2}). At an altitude of 60 km, the rocket engine is shut down and the plane continues to climb up to a maximum altitude of 100 km. This is the weightlessness phase.

Then the plane gets down to 15 km at a high angle of attack, being progressively decelerated by the atmosphere; at this altitude, after transition to aeronautical mode, the jets are reignited to bring the plane back to a classical landing strip.

== Characteristics ==
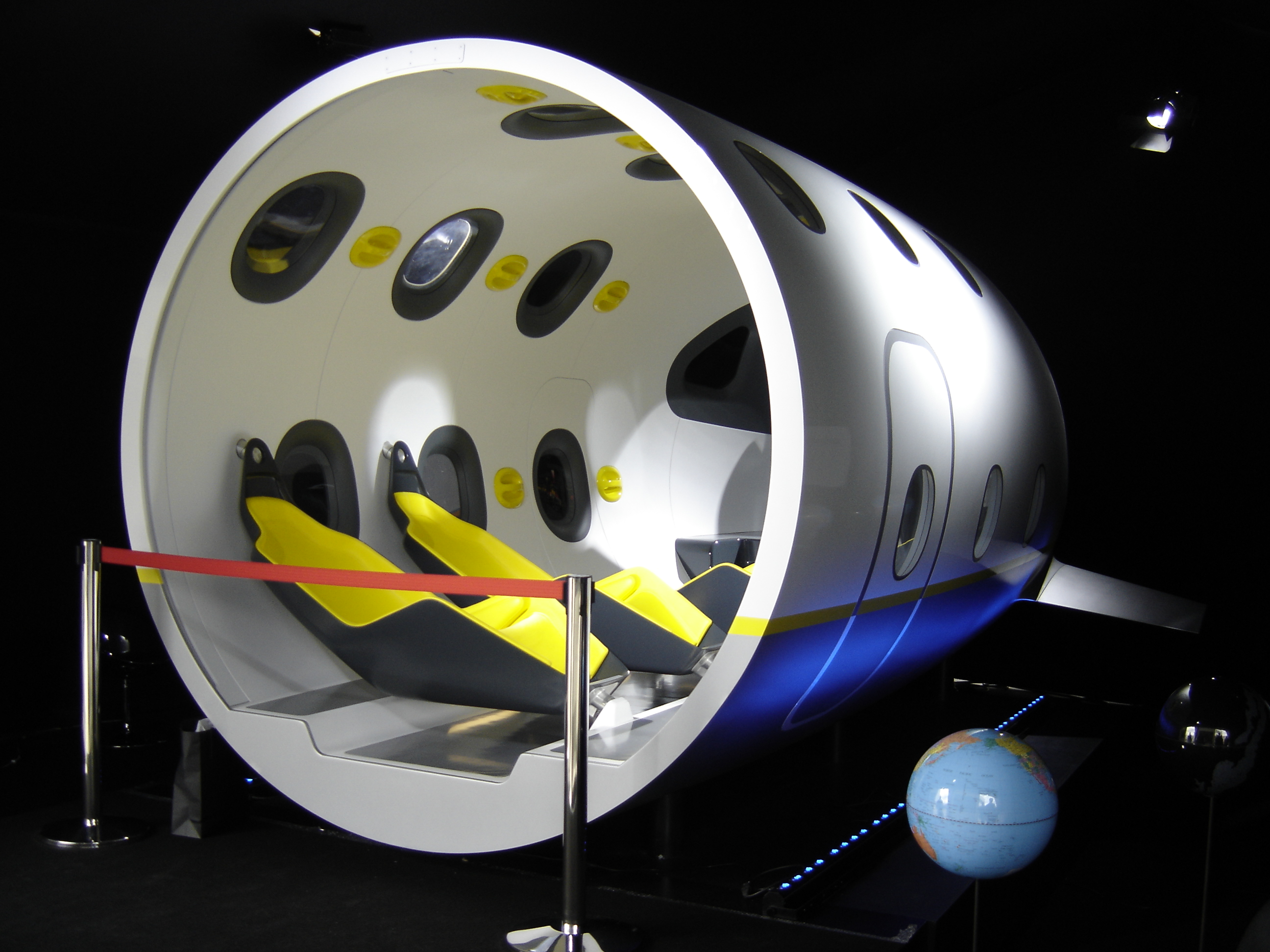
Interior layout of the vehicle at Paris Air Show 2007

The total mass of the vehicle is 18 metric tons (39,700 lb) at takeoff. The plane has two jet engines, and an oxygen-methane engine with a thrust of 30 tons. The rocket engine uses the technology of the Vulcain (the main engine of Ariane 5), but is reusable thirty times and burns methane instead of hydrogen (hydrogen would require too much tank volume, as the density of methane is 667.2 kg/m^{3} and the density of hydrogen is 89.9 kg/m^{3}).

The cabin has a diameter of 2.3 m (7 ft 6 in), and provides 3 m^{3} (10.6 ft^{3}) of cabin space to each passenger. The seats are attached to a pendular system which allows the acceleration to be perpendicular to the back of the passengers. They pivot around the attachment points so that the passengers are aligned rearside to the spacecraft x-axis (body aligned on Gx-axis) during launch acceleration and they are rearside on the negative z-axis during weightlessness and reentry.

The plane is designed for ten years of service at a flight rate of once a week.

== Industrial organisation ==
The development will be led by EADS Astrium. Its technical responsibility currently resides with the CTO Robert Lainé.

In 2007, development cost of $1 billion was projected by some sources. EADS Astrium plans to raise mostly private money for its project. One of the possible public investors mentioned by François Auque is the southern German state of Bavaria, where the engines are to be produced. Astrium could produce up to 5 planes a year and have a fleet of 20 planes, which would require a production of 20 rocket engines a year. They do not exclude selling models to other entrepreneurs such as Sir Richard Branson from Virgin Galactic.

The final assembly would be in France, while the other industrial facilities of Astrium would provide the rocket engines (Ottobrunn, Germany) or the carbon fiber structures (Spain). Other European industrial partners are associated with the project.

The target of Astrium is to secure 30% of the market of space tourism by 2020, 5000 passengers a year.

The ticket price will be 200,000 euros, including a round trip to the spaceport, training, and luxury accommodation in a theme park/resort.

== Criticisms ==
Burt Rutan, founder of Scaled Composites, a competitor in space tourism to EADS, expressed scepticism towards the EADS Project.

The non-recurring development cost of a suborbital spaceship that has rocket and jet engines — both of which leave the atmosphere and experience reentry — will be far more than our SpaceShipTwo program.

== See also ==
- Dream Chaser
- New Shepard
- SpaceShipTwo
- Zero Emission Hyper Sonic Transport
- XCOR Lynx (cancelled)
- Rocketplane XP (cancelled)
