= Rob Meyerson =

American aerospace engineer

- Education: University of Michigan
- Known for: advocating space mining
- Title: Former President of Blue Origin

Robert E. Meyerson is an American aerospace engineer and executive.

Meyerson is the co-founder and CEO of Interlune, a natural resources company focused on harvesting resources from the Moon. Interlune came out of stealth mode in March 2024.

He is the former president of Blue Origin.

== Early life and education ==
Originally from Southfield, Michigan, a suburb of Detroit, Meyerson earned a B.S. in aerospace engineering from the University of Michigan and a master's degree in engineering management from the University of Houston.

== Career ==
=== Delalune Space ===
Meyerson is the founder and CEO of Delalune Space, a management consulting firm providing advisory services to the aerospace, mobility, technology, and financial sectors. He is a board director or advisor to numerous organizations.

=== Axiom Space ===
In 2021, it was announced that Meyerson, former Blue Origin president, would be joining Axiom's board of directors and that Axiom Space had raised $130m in a new round of funding.

Meyerson stated that Axiom Space is a force in the space sector, and it would enhance the vision for a secure global future.

=== Blue Origin ===
Meyerson joined Blue Origin in 2003 as program manager later becoming the first company president. Working with company founder Jeff Bezos, Meyerson grew the company from 10 to 1500 people. Under Meyerson's leadership, Blue Origin developed the New Shepard system for suborbital human and research flights, and the New Glenn system for orbital human and research flights, as well as the manufacturing and test capabilities that enable these programs. He also developed Blue Origin into a liquid rocket engine supplier, creating and selling the BE-3 LOX/LH2 rocket engine and the BE-4 LOX/LNG rocket engine to other companies.

From January to November 2018, Meyerson was the senior vice-president in charge of the Advanced Development Programs business unit.

=== Kistler Aerospace and NASA ===
Before joining Blue Origin Meyerson was a senior manager at Kistler Aerospace Corporation responsible for the development of the K-1 reusable launch vehicle, the landing, and thermal protection systems of a two-stage reusable launch vehicle, as well as all technical activities related to Kistler's Space Launch Initiative contract with NASA’s Marshall Space Flight Center.

Meyerson launched his career as an aerospace engineer at NASA Johnson Space Center (JSC) from 1985 to 1997 working on human spaceflight systems, including the aerodynamic design of the Space Shuttle orbiter drag parachute, as well as the overall design, integration, and flight test of a gliding parachute for the X-38 Crew Rescue Vehicle, a crew return vehicle designed to return astronauts to earth from the International Space Station. Meyerson began with NASA in 1985 as a cooperative education student at JSC.

== Social engagement ==
Meyerson has been a long-time advocate for outreach programs that provide work experience and sponsors Blue's internship program, which has inspired and encouraged many university-level students to pursue careers in the aerospace industry. In December 2016, Meyerson gave the commencement speech at Embry Riddle Aeronautical University.

He is a trustee at the Museum of Flight in Seattle, a former member of the board of the Commercial Spaceflight Federation, and is a member of the Leadership Advisory Board for the College of Engineering at the University of Michigan and a member of the Visiting Committee for the Aeronautics & Astronautics Department at the University of Washington.

He is an AIAA Fellow, and a former member of the Aerodynamic Decelerator Systems Technical Committee. He was awarded the Space Flight Award by the American Astronautical Society in 2016. This award is given annually and is the highest award bestowed by the AAS.

Meyerson was inspired by the Apollo program and also by launching model rockets as a child. For his 5th birthday, he received a cardboard mock-up of the Apollo Lunar Module and remembers playing inside of it. He later found the ingredients for rocket fuel in a cigar box that had been placed in the rafters of his childhood home by his two older brothers.
