= FAST20XX =

European Space Agency programme

FAST20XX (Future High-Altitude High Speed Transport 20XX ) was a European Space Agency (ESA) programme to develop the necessary technologies for a hypersonic suborbital spaceplane. Funding for the programme was established under the European Commission's Seventh Framework Programme.

== Overview ==
The FAST 20XX programme run from 2009 to 2012 and was intended to provide a technological foundation for the industrial introduction of advanced hypersonic suborbital spaceplanes in the medium to longer term. No detailed vehicle design was planned under the program, with work instead focusing on mastering the technologies required for the development of such designs. Once the needed technologies were identified, researchers developed the dedicated analytical, numerical and experimental tools needed to investigate them. The project also looked at the legal and regulatory issues related to suborbital flight in consultation with government and international authorities.

Two concepts have been focused on under the program. The first, ALPHA, is based on SpaceShipOne, which won the Ansari X-Prize in 2003. A key aspect of the design is the need for a carrier plane to launch the suborbital vessel. The second design to be analyzed is based on the German Aerospace Center's SpaceLiner concept. The SpaceLiner is an all–rocket-propelled vehicle intended to achieve a step change in ultra-fast long-haul passenger and freight transport, with the intended ability to transport 50 passengers from Australia to Europe in 90 minutes.
