= Daniel Raymer =

American engineer

Daniel P. Raymer is an aerospace design engineer widely recognized as an expert in the fields of aircraft conceptual design, design engineering, aircraft configuration, and layout.

== Career ==
Dan Raymer was born in 1954 at the Fort Ord US Army base. His father was Gordon Raymer, a US Navy pilot then attending the Naval Postgraduate School in Monterey, California. While growing up, his family lived in Patuxent River, Maryland, where his father attended test pilot school at the Naval Air Station Patuxent River. Later, his family lived in Taiwan, where his father served as a Lockheed P-2 Neptune instructor pilot and mission planner with the Black Bat Squadron.

After leaving the navy, his father went to work in the Advanced Design Department at Lockheed and Dan ended up graduating from Royal High School in Simi Valley in 1972. While in high school, he started flying lessons at the Santa Paula Airport. After graduating, he attended Purdue University on a US Air Force ROTC scholarship. While at Purdue, he received his pilot's license. He graduated from Purdue with BS and MS degrees in aeronautical engineering in 1976.

He then went to work at Rockwell North American Aviation as an aircraft configuration designer. He developed the computer-aided Configuration Development System (CDS) and served as Chief Engineer on Rockwell's design for the Advanced Tactical Fighter. He was also head of Air Vehicle Design in the early stages of the design of the Rockwell-MBB X-31. In addition, he attended the University of Southern California and earned an MBA.

In 1986 he left Rockwell to help start a new organization, the Aerojet Propulsion Research Institute. After about 18 months, Aerojet was financially impacted by a hostile takeover attempt and the Institute was shut down. He used his six months of severance pay to finish writing Aircraft Design: A Conceptual Approach.

After this, he went to work at Lockheed as Director of Advanced Design and held a second position as Director of Advanced Concept Design at the Lockheed Skunk Works. After three years (1987–1990) at Lockheed, he left to start his own company Conceptual Research Corporation (1990), and also teach at California State University, Northridge (1990–1993). During this time, he started consulting then working at the RAND Corporation (1993–2004).

As president of Conceptual Research Corporation, he has worked on the Orbital Sciences Stargazer and the Pioneer Rocketplane. He also earned a Doctorate of Engineering (Ph.D.) from the Swedish Royal Institute of Technology (KTH).

Raymer is best known for publishing the professional textbooks Aircraft Design: A Conceptual Approach and Dan Raymer's Simplified Aircraft Design for Homebuilders, which have become recognized as premier textbooks in the field of aircraft conceptual design. He regularly teaches conceptual design courses for aircraft and UAVs through the AIAA and other professional organizations.

== Honors and awards ==
- AIAA Aircraft Design Award (2010)
- AIAA Sustained Service Award (2003)
- AIAA Summerfield Book Award (2000)
- Purdue University Outstanding Aerospace Engineering Alumni Award (2000)
- Rockwell Engineer of the Year (1979)
- Aviation/Space Writers Association 1991 Award of Excellence
- AIAA Distinguished Lecturer, 1990–1992
- American Institute of Aeronautics & Astronautics - Fellow
- Institute for the Advancement of Engineering (IAE) - Fellow

== Bibliography ==
- Raymer, Daniel P. (1992). Aircraft Design: A Conceptual Approach (2nd ed.). Washington: AIAA. ISBN 9780930403515. OCLC 0930403517.
- Raymer, Daniel P. (2003). Dan Raymer's Simplified Aircraft Design for Homebuilders. Los Angeles, CA: Design Dimension Press. ISBN 9780972239707. OCLC 52902850.
- Raymer, Daniel P. (2010). Living in the Future: The Education & Adventures of an Advanced Aircraft Designer. Playa del Rey, Calif: Design Dimension. ISBN 9780972239721. OCLC 463639017.
