= Rocketplane XP =

Suborbital space plane design

XP

General information
- Type: Sub-orbital spaceplane
- National origin: United States
- Manufacturer: Rocketplane Kistler
- Status: Cancelled
- Number built: 0

The Rocketplane XP was a suborbital spaceplane design that was under development c. 2005 by Rocketplane Kistler. The vehicle was to be powered by two jet engines and a rocket engine, intended to enable it to reach suborbital space. The XP would have operated from existing spaceports in a manner consistent with established commercial aviation practices. Commercial flights were projected to begin in 2009. Rocketplane Global declared bankruptcy in mid-June 2010. Their assets were auctioned off in 2011.

== Design and development ==
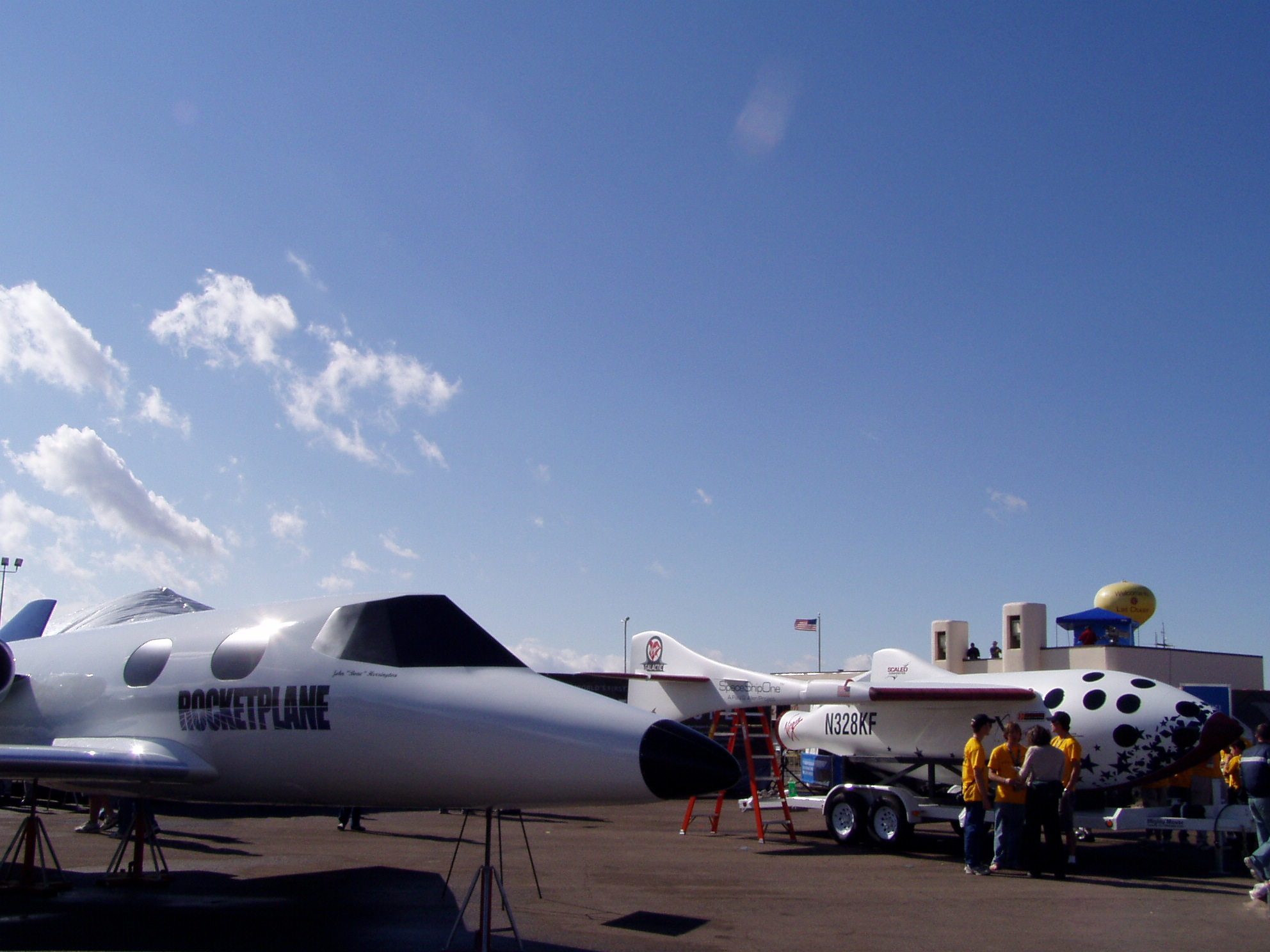
A Mockup of the Rocketplane XP alongside SpaceshipOne

As envisioned, the Rocketplane XP would carry a pilot and five passengers on a flight profile from a runway using jet engines like a conventional aircraft. It would then climb to about 12 km (40,000 feet). At this point, a reusable rocket engine would power the XP on a suborbital trajectory reaching altitudes of over 100 km (62 mi) after burnout. The XP was to then reenter Earth's atmosphere and land at the same spaceport under conventional jet power. The relatively low speeds involved meant that heat shielding was not a major concern. The XP was expected to operate from the Clinton-Sherman Industrial Airpark near Burns Flat, Oklahoma.

On January 24, 2006 Rocketplane Limited announced a Space Act agreement with NASA Johnson Space Center for the loan of a Rocketdyne RS-88 rocket engine for three years, for use in flight tests of the XP vehicle.

== See also ==
- EADS Astrium Space Tourism Project
- Lynx (spacecraft)
- Dream Chaser
- SpaceShipTwo
- Blue Origin New Shepard
