= Kistler K-1 =

Rocket type

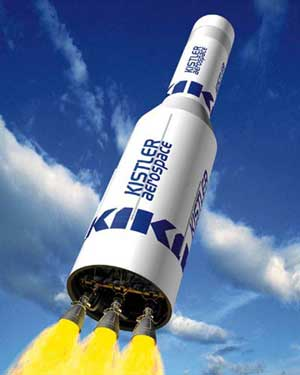
- A render of the K-1 in flight, produced by Rocketplane Kistler
- Function: Orbital launch vehicle
- Manufacturer: Kistler Aerospace
- Country of origin: United States

Size
- Height: 36.9 m (121 ft)
- Diameter: 6.7 m (21.9 ft)
- Stages: 2

Capacity

Payload to Low Earth orbit
- Altitude: 200 km (120 mi)
- Orbital inclination: 45°
- Mass: 4,500 kg (9,900 lb)

Payload to International Space Station
- Mass: 3,200 kg (7,100 lb)

Payload to Geostationary transfer orbit
- Altitude: 900 km (560 mi)
- Orbital inclination: 60°
- Mass: 1,570 kg (3,460 lb)

Associated rockets
- Comparable: GSLV; Long March 4B; Antares

First stage – Launch Assist Platform
- Height: 18.4 m (60 ft)
- Diameter: 6.7 m (22 ft)
- Empty mass: 20,500 kg (45,200 lb) (Note: Includes mass of parachutes and airbags)
- Gross mass: 250,000 kg (550,000 lb)
- Powered by: 3 × NK-33
- Maximum thrust: 4,530 kN (1,020,000 lbf) sea level
- Specific impulse: 297 seconds sea level
- Burn time: 168 seconds (plus additional 35 seconds for boostback burn)
- Propellant: RP-1 / LOX

Second stage
- Height: 18.6 m (61 ft)
- Diameter: 4.27 m (14.0 ft)
- Empty mass: 13,100 kg (28,900 lb) (Note: Includes mass of payload bay, heat shield, parachutes, and airbags)
- Gross mass: 131,000 kg (289,000 lb)
- Powered by: 1 × NK-43
- Maximum thrust: 1,769 kN (398,000 lbf) vacuum
- Specific impulse: 348 seconds vacuum
- Burn time: 233 seconds
- Propellant: RP-1 / LOX

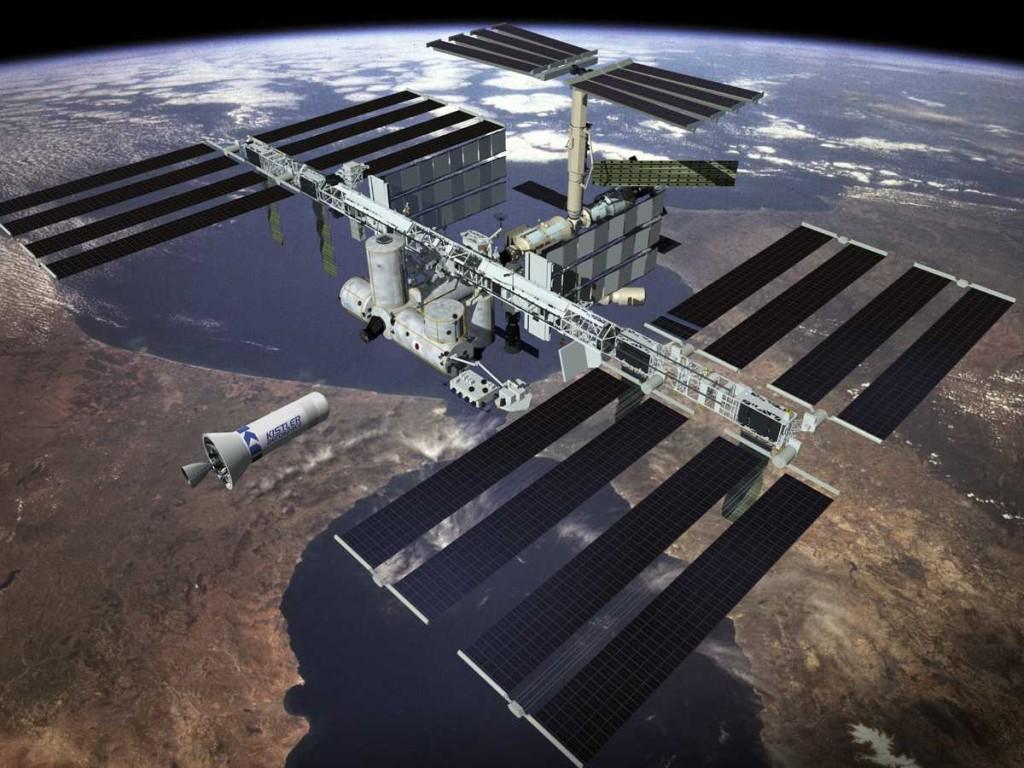
Computer rendering of Kistler K-1 approaching ISS.

The Kistler K-1 was a two-stage, fully reusable launch vehicle design created by Kistler Aerospace. It was to accommodate a wide range of missions, including payload delivery to low Earth orbit (LEO), payload delivery to high-energy orbits with a K-1 Active Dispenser, technology demonstration flights, microgravity missions, and commercial cargo resupply, recovery, and reboost services for the International Space Station (ISS).

In 2004, the company won a NASA contract to fly supply missions to ISS. At the time, Kistler claimed that the design of the K-1 was 75% complete, and the $227 million NASA contract would be used to complete development and the first flights. SpaceX protested, suggesting that the presence of well-known former NASA engineers biased the decision in favor of Kistler. The Government Accountability Office (GAO) sided with SpaceX and NASA suspended the contract in favor of a new process, the Commercial Orbital Transportation Services (COTS) program.

Lacking funding to complete development, in 2006 Kistler was purchased by Rocketplane Limited, Inc, who had previously been developing a competing concept. Both SpaceX and the new Rocketplane Kistler won COTS contracts in August 2006, but after failing to meet several financial milestones, NASA announced in October 2007 that it was terminating funding for the project. The company declared bankruptcy in 2010.

== Design ==
=== First stage ===
The first stage was called the Launch Assist Platform (LAP). It was to use three AJ26 engines, provided by Aerojet, in a linear pattern. These were built as NK-33 engines in the Soviet Union; in the 1990s, Aerojet purchased 43 of them and refurbished them with American electronics.

After stage separation, the first stage would perform a boostback burn (similar to that of the later SpaceX Falcon 9) to erase its horizontal velocity. Once the stage had coasted most of the way back near the launch site, it would deploy six parachutes to further scrub off speed. Moments before impact, airbags would inflate, bringing the stage to a soft landing from which it could be recovered and reused up to 100 times.

=== Second stage ===
The second stage was known as the Orbital Vehicle. It was to use one vacuum-optimized AJ26, also from Aerojet. One of two payload modules (the Standard and Extended varieties) could be attached to the second stage; as there was no payload fairing, both of these had a shallow dome on the front for aerodynamic and thermal reasons.

After delivering its payload to the target orbit, the second stage would wait in orbit until it was above the targeted landing site, at which point it would fire its reaction control thrusters to deorbit. The vehicle would reenter nose-first, shielded by a thermal protection system at the tip of the payload module. From this point, the second stage would follow the same recovery profile as the first stage, deploying parachutes and making a soft impact with airbags.

== Progress on design and construction ==
Design work on the K-1 began in 1994, and was complete enough for subcontracts by 1996. The vehicle was originally planned to be in operation by 2000, but delays resulted in the first vehicle only being 75% complete in August 2004.

Major partners/subcontractors included:

- Lockheed Martin: Tanks and Vehicle Assembly
- GenCorp Aerojet: Propulsion Systems
- Northrop Grumman: Vehicle Structure
- Draper Laboratory: Guidance: Navigation and Control and Mission Control System
- AlliedSignal Aerospace: Vehicle Management System
- Irvin Aerospace: Landing System (parachutes, and maybe airbags)
- Oceaneering Thermal Systems: Thermal Protection System
- Reynolds, Smith, and Hills/Leighton Contractors: Launch Facility

== Cancellation ==
In October 2007 Rocketplane Kistler, the company that was building the K-1, lost its contract with NASA for the COTS program over failure to meet funding targets. Subsequently, Kistler experienced financial trouble which necessitated widespread employee layoffs. The company filed for Chapter 7 bankruptcy in 2010, and though it was reconstituted as Kistler Space Systems, no progress on the K-1 vehicle (or, for that matter, any Kistler venture) has been reported since late December 2010.

== See also ==
- Commercial Orbital Transportation Services
- List of private spaceflight companies#Crew and cargo transport vehicles
- List of space launch system designs
- Rocketplane Limited, Inc.
