= Rocketplane Global Inc. =

Aerospace company

- Company type: Private
- Industry: Aerospace and defense
- Founded: 2001
- Headquarters: De Pere, Wisconsin, United States
- Key people: John A. Burgener, CEO and Director. George D. French Jr., CEO, John Burgener, VP, Chuck Lauer, Business Development and Marketing
- Products: Suborbital spacecraft Space systems Satellite Launch
- Number of employees: 4 (as of 2017-05-01)
- Website: https://www.rocketplane.com, https://rocketplane.ca

Rocketplane Global Inc. is a reusable rocketplane aerospace design and development company incorporated in Delaware. It was founded as Rocketplane Limited, Inc. in 2001 in De Pere.

== History ==
Rocketplane Limited, Inc. was incorporated under the laws of the state of Oklahoma on 16 July 2001. After going bankrupt, it was bought out of bankruptcy, and renamed to Rocketplane Global. As of April, 2017, it is incorporated in Delaware. The corporation’s founders envisioned building a rocketplane that would send passengers more than 330,000 feet (100 km) above the Earth and launch satellites. In 2004, Rocketplane Limited was designated a Qualified Space Transportation Provider by the State of Oklahoma under the guidelines specified in SB 817. With this designation, the State of Oklahoma awarded to Rocketplane re-sellable tax credits that were used to initiate operations, develop facilities, and recruit the required engineering staff.

Rocketplane Global Inc. (A Delaware company) is the current name of the company. Rocketplane Global Inc. is the successor of Pioneer Rocketplane, Rocketplane Limited of Oklahoma, Rocketplane Kistler, and Rocketplane Global LLC.

Pioneer Rocketplane and Rocketplane Kistler have been dissolved. Kistler Space Systems has replaced the Kistler part of Rocketplane Kistler. Rocketplane Kistler owned the intellectual property of Pioneer.

George French, CEO of Rocketplane Limited, announced on 27 February 2006 that he was purchasing Kistler Aerospace for an undisclosed sum, and renaming it Rocketplane Kistler. Kistler Aerospace had designed and begun construction of the K-1 launch vehicle, a fully reusable two-stage to orbit launcher, but filed for bankruptcy before the vehicle could be completed. French used the K-1 to bid for commercial crew and cargo resupply contracts to the International Space Station under the NASA COTS (Commercial Orbital Transportation Services) program. This contract was awarded jointly to SpaceX and Rocketplane Kistler on 18 August 2006.

=== Bankruptcy ===
In 2007, it was reported that Rocketplane Kistler was experiencing funding problems, layoffs, and failed to meet their contract deadlines with NASA.

On October 18, 2007, NASA discontinued its agreement with Rocketplane Kistler, and announced that the remaining $175 million commitment to the project would be made available to other companies. On October 19, the company appealed the decision, and asked NASA to reconsider the termination or, alternatively, pay $10 million in costs incurred to date.

In February 2009, Rocketplane vacated its Oklahoma City headquarters building. According to Oklahoma State Representative David Dank, Rocketplane no longer has any presence in the state, but Rocketplane has paid all of its taxes and has no outstanding debts which is remarkable for a company to accomplish this while going bankrupt. Rocketplane filed for Chapter 7 bankruptcy and liquidation in July 2010.

=== Out of bankruptcy ===
In 2011 Rocketplane Limited's assets were sold in an auction and bought by George French and John Burgener. The assets were rolled into the new company Rocketplane Global LLC, based in De Pere, Wisconsin. Focus moved from passenger flights with the XP spaceplane to satellites with the Pathfinder / XS larger rocketplane. Rocketplane Global significantly updated and revised the Pathfinder plans to submit a bid for DARPA's XS-1 program, but did not win a contract. Rocketplane Global moved its state of incorporation to Delaware in April, 2017, to allow for better financing opportunities

Rocketplane Global Inc. claimed to have one of the most affordable designs to provide reusable launch services for small to medium satellites. With an expected retail price of $20 million per launch, and a 2,000 kg payload to LEO, Rocketplane Global expected to provide launch services at half the then-current retail pricing on launches. Rocketplane Global had agreements to launch over 100 satellites starting in 2021 - 2022 if it could obtain sufficient funding in 2017. However, there have been no updates since then, and the company's website is abandoned as of mid-2024.

== Rocketplane Variants ==
=== SP (Space tourism) ===
Rocketplane Limited intended to fly space tourism flights using the Rocketplane XP spaceplane it was building. It had announced plans to fly the XP in 2007, but on August 31, 2007 its chief executive officer, Calvin Burgess, said test flights would be delayed until 2009 and commercial flights were pushed back until at least 2010. Rocketplane anticipated ticket prices of US$200,000 for a seat on a suborbital flight, including 4 minutes of weightlessness, with an apogee of over 100 kilometers altitude.

=== The XS design ===
Rocketplane Global's XS design follows on the work done on the XP passenger vehicle and continues using jet engines for take off and flight to altitude. It then loads on LOX and fuel from a tanker airplane, and then fires its rocket engines and flies to 100+ km, where it releases a second stage booster to carry the satellite(s) to orbit. With a totally reusable first stage, and an expendable second stage, the costs are minimized and the system is more reliable than trying to land vertical take off and landing rockets.

The Rocketplane XS bears some similarity to the Black Horse concept.

== See also ==
- Rocketplane Kistler
- Blue Origin
- Virgin Galactic
- List of private spaceflight companies — A compiled list of private spaceflight companies
