= Mitchell Burnside Clapp =

American aerospace engineer and musician

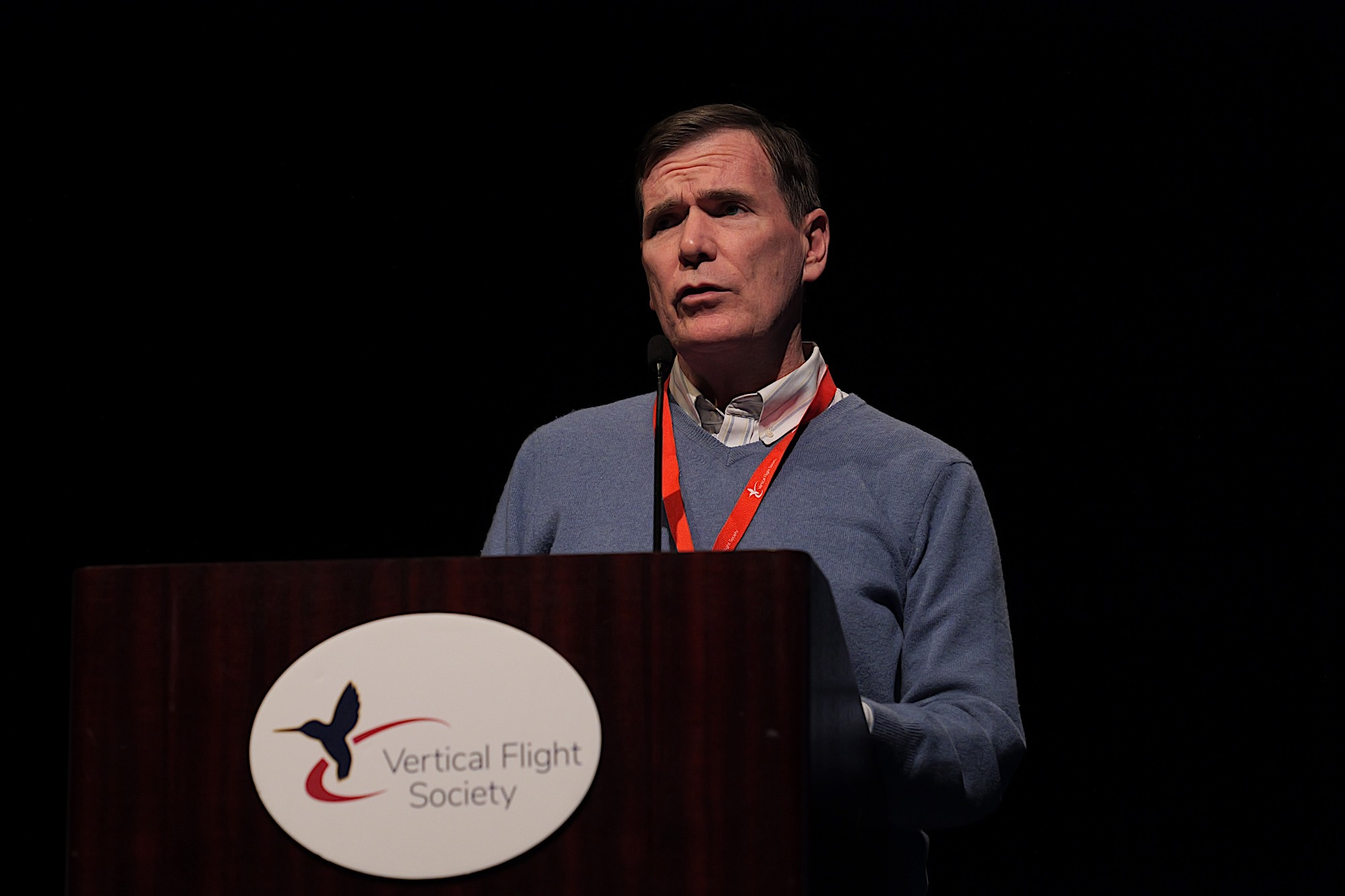
- Clapp in 2024
- Education: Massachusetts Institute of Technology
- Spouse: TJ Burnside Clapp
- Engineering career
- Employer(s): Pioneer Rocketplane, Embassy Aerospace, DARPA, USAF Test Pilot School, Millennium Space Systems
- Projects: SALVO, ALASA
- Significant advance: Aerial propellant transfer technology for spaceplanes

Mitchell Burnside Clapp is an Australian-American aerospace engineer, former test pilot, and musician. He received Bachelor of Science degrees in Physics, Aeronautics and Astronautics, and Russian, as well as a Master of Science degree in Aeronautics and Astronautics, from the Massachusetts Institute of Technology.

== Career ==
In the late 1980s and 1990s, Burnside Clapp attended the U.S. Air Force Test Pilot School and worked on the YA-7F and DC-X projects.

Together with Robert Zubrin and Chuck Lauer, Burnside Clapp founded Pioneer Rocketplane in 1996. He and Zubrin authored a piece in the MIT Technology Review of January/February 1998 calling for more air-launched rockets.

From 2011 to 2015, Burnside Clapp served as a program manager at DARPA.

== Personal life ==
He is married to fellow filker TJ Burnside Clapp, formerly of the musical group Technical Difficulties. They have three children. He has won two Pegasus Awards for his music.
