= Spaceplane =

Spacecraft capable of aerodynamic flight in atmosphere

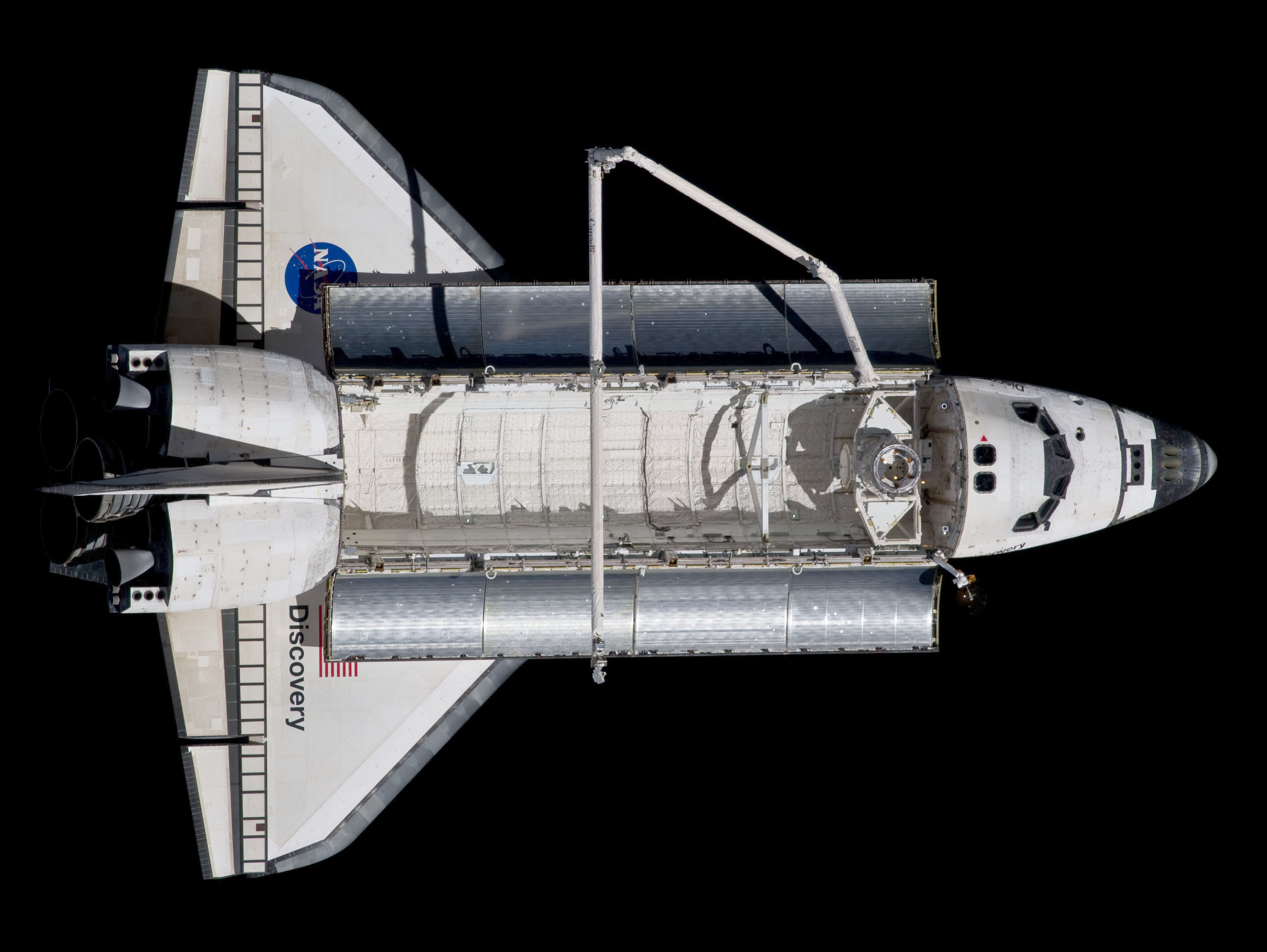
Space Shuttle Discovery

A spaceplane is a vehicle that can fly and glide as an aircraft in Earth's atmosphere and function as a spacecraft in outer space. To do so, spaceplanes must incorporate features of both aircraft and spacecraft. Orbital spaceplanes tend to be more similar to conventional spacecraft, while sub-orbital spaceplanes tend to be more similar to fixed-wing aircraft. All spaceplanes as of 2024 have been rocket-powered for takeoff and climb, but have then landed as unpowered gliders.

Four examples of spaceplanes have successfully launched to orbit, reentered Earth's atmosphere, and landed: the U.S. Space Shuttle, the Russian Buran, the U.S. X-37, and the Chinese Shenlong. Another, Dream Chaser, is under development in the U.S. As of 2024, all past and current orbital spaceplanes launch vertically; some are carried as a payload in a conventional fairing, while the Space Shuttle used its own engines with the assistance of boosters and an external tank. Orbital spaceflight takes place at high velocities, with orbital kinetic energies typically greater than suborbital trajectories. This kinetic energy is shed as heat during re-entry. Many more spaceplanes have been proposed.

At least two suborbital rocket-powered aircraft have been launched horizontally into sub-orbital spaceflight from an airborne carrier aircraft before rocketing beyond the Kármán line: the X-15 and SpaceShipOne. (Note: In 2018, SpaceShipTwo passed the US definition of space of 80km, but not the 100km Kármán line.)

== Principles of operation ==
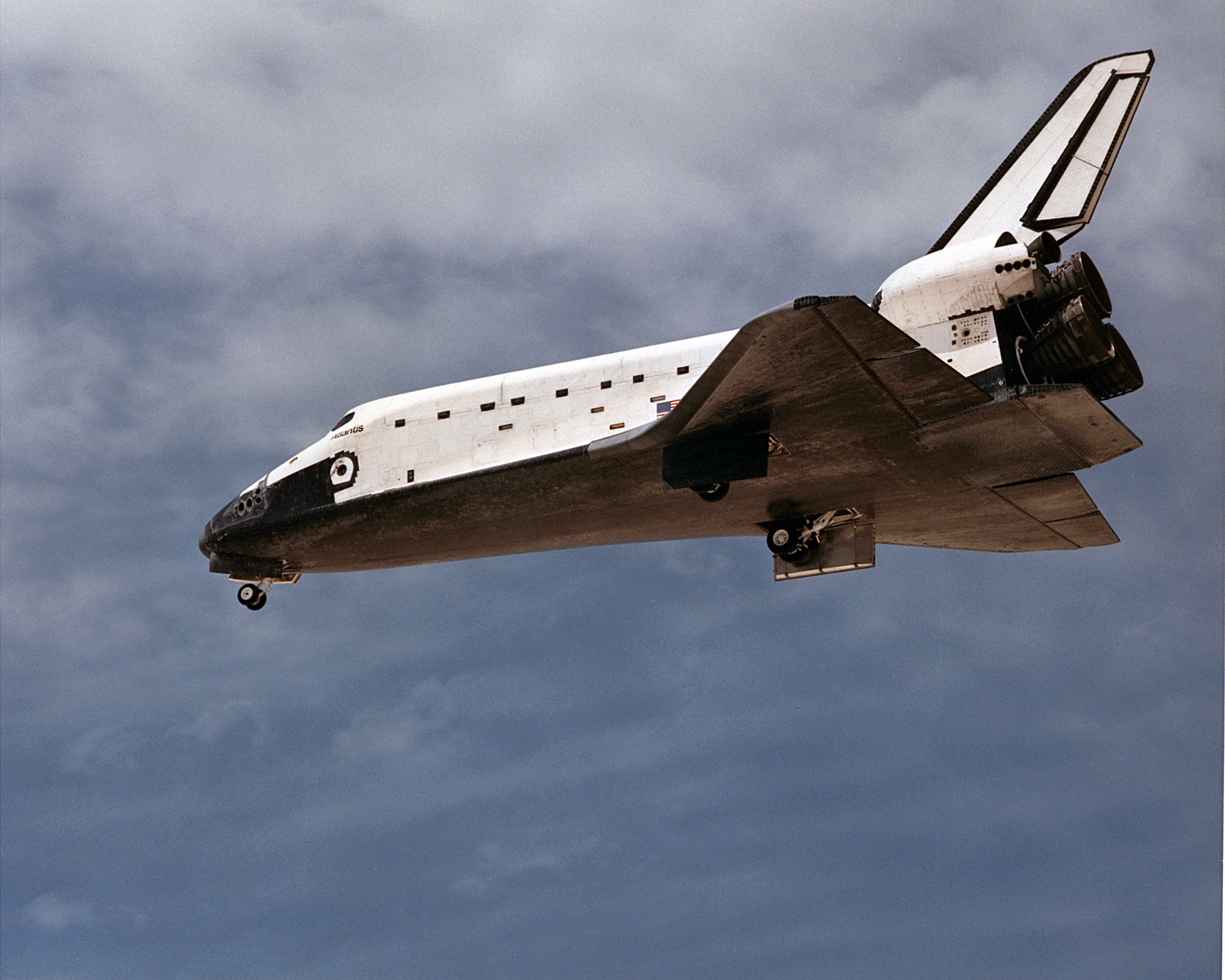
Landing of Space Shuttle Atlantis, a crewed orbital spaceplane

Spaceplanes must operate in space, like traditional spacecraft, but also must be capable of atmospheric flight, like an aircraft.

Spaceplanes do not necessarily have to fly by their own propulsion, but instead often glide with their inertia while using aerodynamic surfaces to maneuver in the atmosphere during descent and landing. The U.S. Space Shuttle for instance, could not fly under its own propulsion but used its momentum after de-orbit to glide to the runway destination.

These requirements drive up the complexity, risk, dry mass, and cost of spaceplane designs. The following sections will draw heavily on the US Space Shuttle as the biggest, most complex, most expensive, most flown, and only crewed orbital spaceplane, but other designs have been successfully flown.

=== Launch to space ===
The flight trajectory required to reach orbit results in significant aerodynamic loads, vibrations, and accelerations, all of which have to be withstood by the vehicle structure.

If the launch vehicle suffers a catastrophic malfunction, a conventional capsule spacecraft is propelled to safety by a launch escape system. The Space Shuttle was far too big and heavy for this approach to be viable, resulting in a number of abort modes that may or may not have been survivable. The Challenger disaster demonstrated a lack of survivability on ascent.

=== Space environment ===
Once on-orbit, a spaceplane must be supplied with power by solar panels and batteries or fuel cells, maneuvered in space, kept in thermal equilibrium, oriented, and communicated with. On-orbit thermal and radiological environments impose additional stresses. This is in addition to accomplishing the task the spaceplane was launched to complete, such as satellite deployment or science experiments.

The Space Shuttle used dedicated engines to accomplish orbital maneuvers. These engines used toxic hypergolic propellants that required special handling precautions. Various gases, including helium for pressurization and nitrogen for life support, were stored under high pressure in composite overwrapped pressure vessels.

=== Atmospheric reentry ===
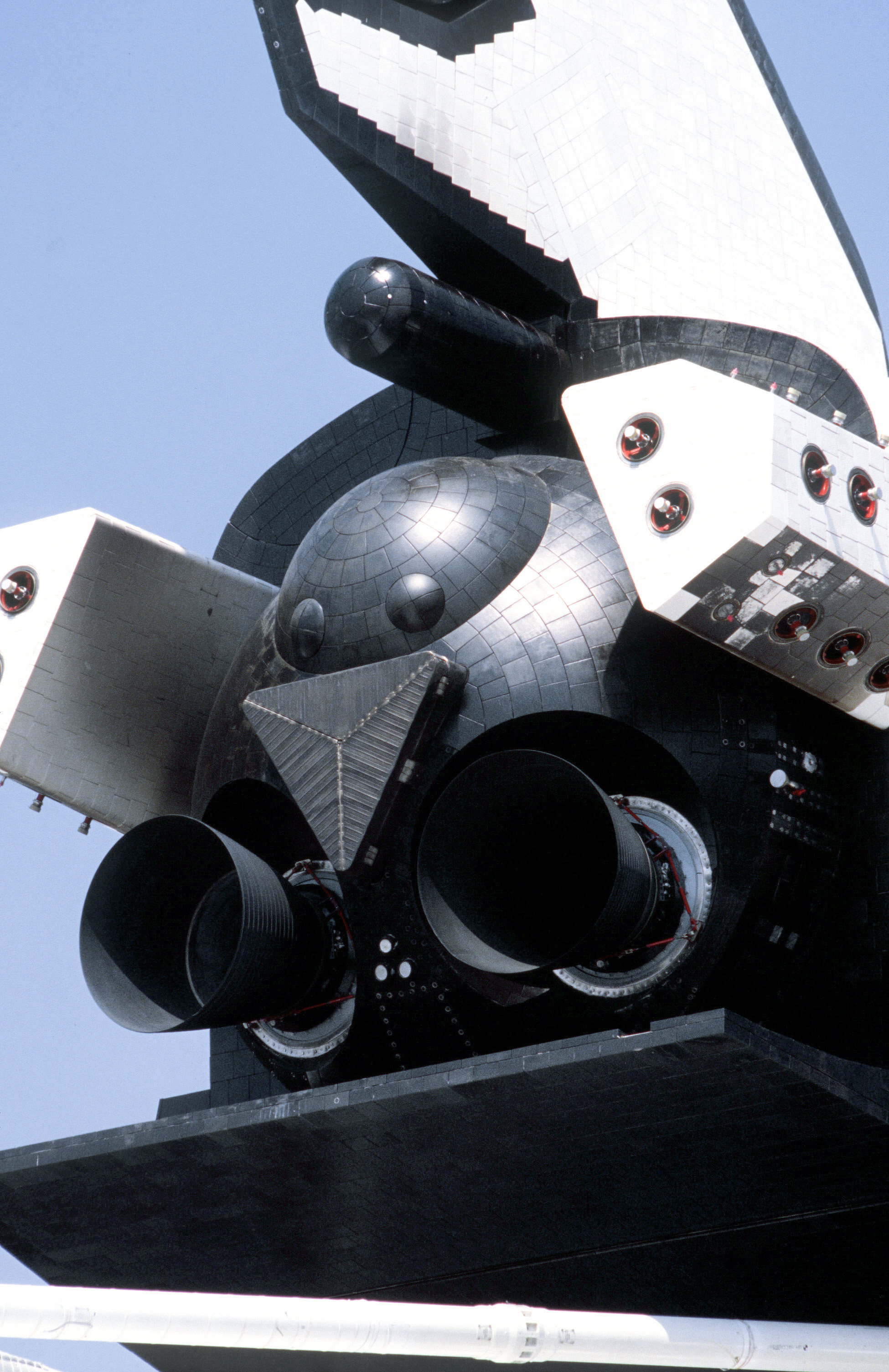
Buran spaceplane rear showing rocket engine nozzles, attitude control thrusters, aerodynamic surfaces, and heat shielding

Orbital spacecraft reentering the Earth's atmosphere must shed significant velocity, resulting in extreme heating. For example, the Space Shuttle thermal protection system (TPS) protects the orbiter's interior structure from surface temperatures that reach as high as 1,650 °C (3,000 °F), well above the melting point of steel. Suborbital spaceplanes fly lower energy trajectories that do not put as much stress on the spacecraft thermal protection system.

The Space Shuttle Columbia disaster was the direct result of a TPS failure.

=== Aerodynamic flight and horizontal landing ===
Aerodynamic control surfaces must be actuated. Landing gear must be included at the cost of additional mass.

=== Air-breathing orbital spaceplane concept ===
An air-breathing orbital spaceplane would have to fly what is known as a 'depressed trajectory,' which places the vehicle in the high-altitude hypersonic flight regime of the atmosphere for an extended period of time. This environment induces high dynamic pressure, high temperature, and high heat flow loads particularly upon the leading edge surfaces of the spaceplane, requiring exterior surfaces to be constructed from advanced materials and/or use active cooling. Skylon was a proposed spaceplane that would have used air-breathing engines.

== Flown orbital spaceplanes ==
=== Space Shuttle ===
The Space Shuttle is a retired, partially reusable low Earth orbital spacecraft system that went to the ISS and performed other orbital missions. Operated from 1981 to 2011 by the U.S. National Aeronautics and Space Administration (NASA) as part of the Space Shuttle program. Its official program name was the Space Transportation System (STS), taken from the 1969 plan led by U.S. vice president Spiro Agnew for a system of reusable spacecraft where it was the only item funded for development.

The first (STS-1) of four orbital test flights occurred in 1981, leading to operational flights (STS-5) beginning in 1982. Five complete Space Shuttle orbiter vehicles were built and flown on a total of 135 missions from 1981 to 2011. They launched from the Kennedy Space Center (KSC) in Florida. Operational missions launched numerous satellites, interplanetary probes, and the Hubble Space Telescope (HST), conducted science experiments in orbit, participated in the Shuttle-Mir program with Russia, and participated in the construction and servicing of the International Space Station (ISS). The Space Shuttle fleet's total mission time was 1,323 days.

Space Shuttle components include the Orbiter Vehicle (OV) with three clustered Rocketdyne RS-25 main engines, a pair of recoverable solid rocket boosters (SRBs), and the expendable external tank (ET) containing liquid hydrogen and liquid oxygen. The Space Shuttle was launched vertically, like a conventional rocket, with the two SRBs operating in parallel with the orbiter's three RS-25 main engines, which were fueled from the ET. The SRBs were jettisoned before the vehicle reached orbit, while the main engines continued to operate, and the ET was jettisoned after main engine cutoff and just before orbit insertion, which used the orbiter's two Orbital Maneuvering System (OMS) engines. At the conclusion of the mission, the orbiter fired its OMS to deorbit and reenter the atmosphere. The orbiter was protected during reentry by its thermal protection system tiles, and it glided as a spaceplane to a runway landing, usually to the Shuttle Landing Facility at KSC, Florida, or to Rogers Dry Lake in Edwards Air Force Base, California. If the landing occurred at Edwards, the orbiter was flown back to the KSC atop the Shuttle Carrier Aircraft (SCA), a specially modified Boeing 747 designed to carry the shuttle above it.

The first orbiter, Enterprise, was built in 1976 and used in Approach and Landing Tests (ALT), but had no orbital capability. Four fully operational orbiters were initially built: Columbia, Challenger, Discovery, and Atlantis. Of these, two were lost in mission accidents: Challenger in 1986 and Columbia in 2003, with a total of 14 astronauts killed. A fifth operational (and sixth in total) orbiter, Endeavour, was built in 1991 to replace Challenger. The three surviving operational vehicles were retired from service following Atlantis's final flight on July 21, 2011. The U.S. relied on the Russian Soyuz spacecraft to transport astronauts to the ISS from the last Shuttle flight until the launch of the Crew Dragon Demo-2 mission in May 2020.

=== Buran ===
The Buran programme (Russian: Буран, IPA: [bʊˈran], lit. 'Snowstorm' or 'Blizzard') was a Soviet and later Russian reusable spacecraft project to develop the Energia-Buran system, officially known as the Reusable Space System "Buran" (Многоразовая Космическая Система «Буран»), that formally began in 1976 and was suspended in 1993. In addition to being the designation for the whole Soviet/Russian reusable spacecraft project, Buran was also the name given to orbiter 1K, which completed one uncrewed spaceflight in 1988 and was the only Soviet reusable spacecraft to be launched into space. The Buran orbiters used the expendable Energia rocket as a launch vehicle.

The Buran programme was started by the Soviet Union as a response to the United States Space Shuttle programme. The latter's unclassified nature was a boon for the Soviets and resulted in many superficial and functional similarities between American and Soviet shuttle designs. Although the Buran orbiter was similar in appearance to NASA's Space Shuttle orbiter, and could similarly operate as a re-entry spaceplane, its final internal and functional design was different. For example, the main engines during launch were on the Energia rocket and were not taken into orbit by the spacecraft. Smaller rocket engines on the craft's body provided propulsion in orbit and de-orbital burns, similar to the Space Shuttle's OMS pods. Unlike the Space Shuttle whose first orbital spaceflight was accomplished in April 1981, Buran, whose first and only spaceflight occurred in November 1988, had a capability of flying uncrewed missions, as well as performing fully automated landings. The project was the largest and the most expensive in the history of Soviet space exploration.

=== X-37 ===
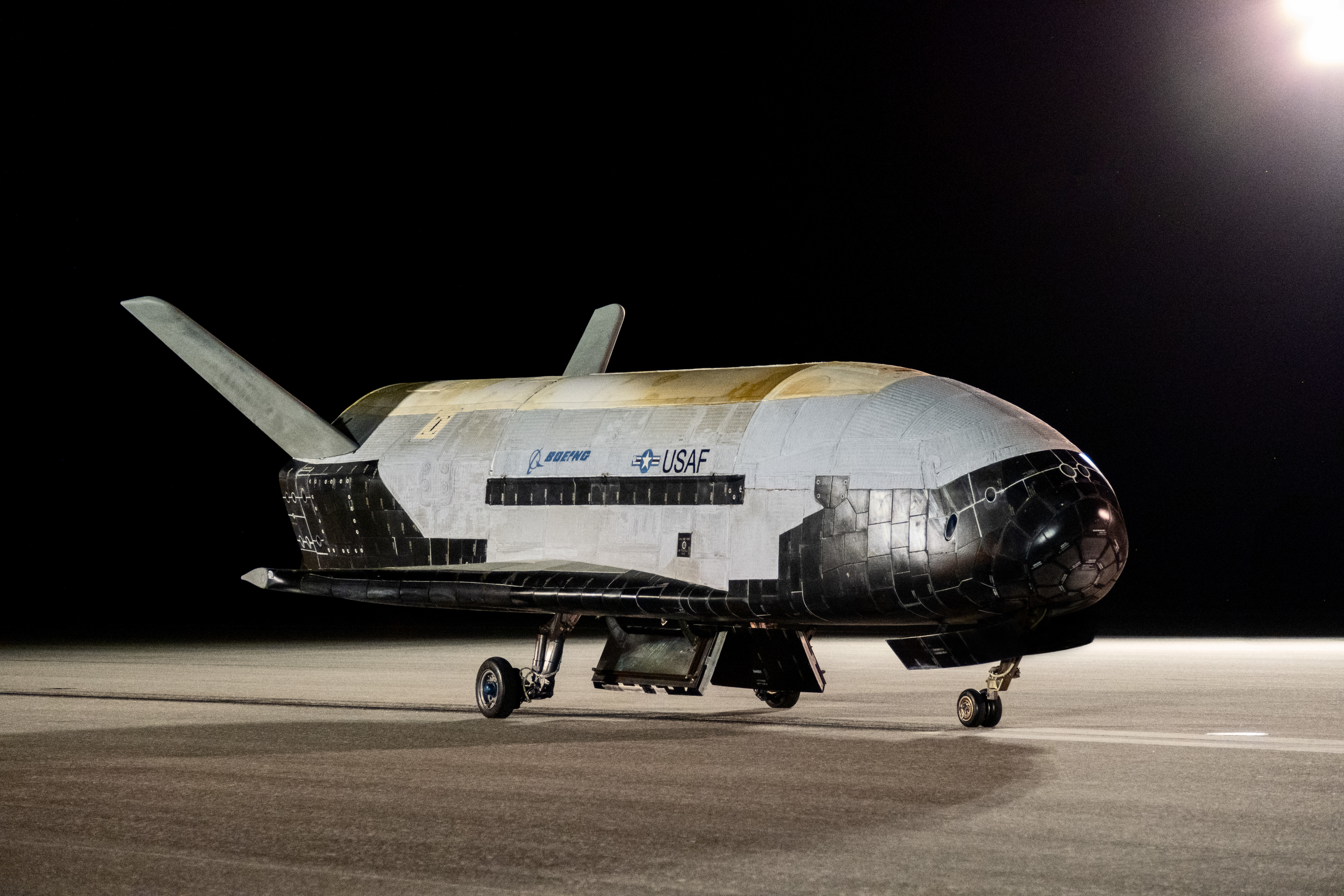
An X-37B after landing

The Boeing X-37, also known as the Orbital Test Vehicle (OTV), is a reusable robotic spacecraft. It is boosted into space by a launch vehicle, re-enters Earth's atmosphere, and lands as a spaceplane. The X-37 is operated by the Department of the Air Force Rapid Capabilities Office, in collaboration with the United States Space Force, for orbital spaceflight missions intended to demonstrate reusable space technologies. It is a 120-percent-scaled derivative of the earlier Boeing X-40. The X-37 began as a NASA project in 1999, before being transferred to the United States Department of Defense in 2004. Until 2019, the program was managed by Air Force Space Command.

An X-37 first flew during a drop test in 2006; its first orbital mission was launched in April 2010 on an Atlas V rocket, and returned to Earth in December 2010. Subsequent flights gradually extended the mission duration, reaching 780 days in orbit for the fifth mission, the first to launch on a Falcon 9 rocket. The sixth mission launched on an Atlas V on 17 May 2020 and concluded on 12 November 2022, reaching 908 days in orbit. The seventh mission launched on 28 December 2023 on a Falcon Heavy rocket, entering a highly elliptical high Earth orbit, landing in March 2025 after 434 days in orbit.

=== Reusable experimental spacecraft ===
A photograph of Chinese reusable experimental spacecraft taken by a satellite.

The Chinese reusable experimental spacecraft (Chinese: 可重复使用试验航天器; pinyin: Kěchóngfùshǐyòng shìyàn hángtiānqì, CSSHQ) is the first reusable spacecraft produced by China. It embarked upon its initial orbital mission on 4 September 2020. According to media reports, the spacecraft is launched into Earth orbit in a vertical configuration while enclosed within the payload fairing of a rocket like a traditional satellite, but it returns to Earth via autonomous runway landing. In the absence of any official descriptions of the spacecraft or photographic depictions thereof, some observers have speculated that the spacecraft may resemble the X-37B spaceplane of the United States in both form and function.

Another reusable robotic spaceplane, Shenlong (simplified Chinese: 神龙; traditional Chinese: 神龍; pinyin: shén lóng; lit. 'divine dragon'), is currently in development. Only a few pictures have appeared in publications since it was revealed in late 2007.

== Flown suborbital rocket planes ==
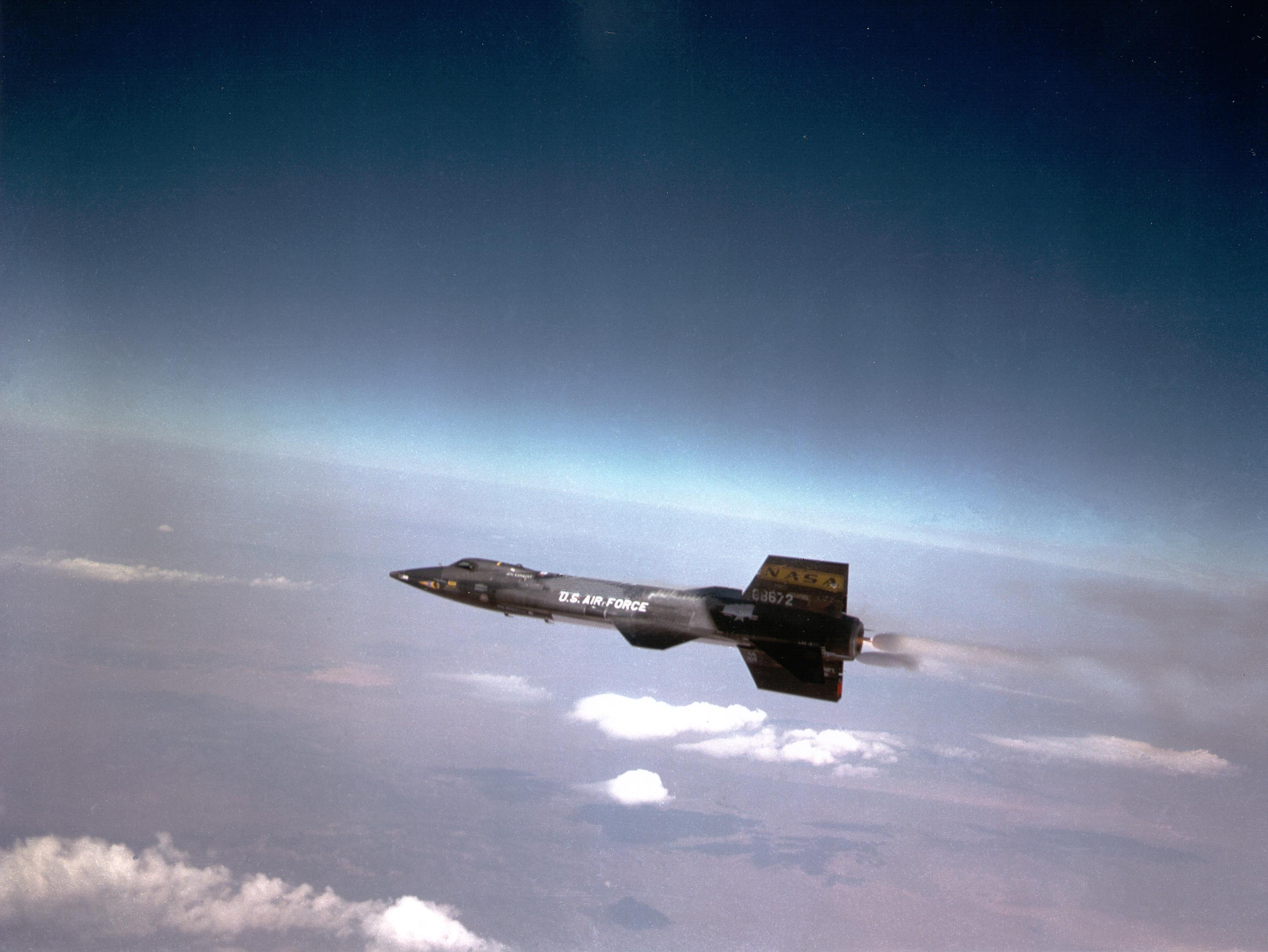
An X-15 in flight

=== United States ===
Two piloted suborbital rocket-powered aircraft have reached space: the North American X-15 and SpaceShipOne; a third, SpaceShipTwo, has crossed the US-defined boundary of space but has not reached the higher internationally recognised boundary. None of these crafts were capable of entering orbit, and all were first lifted to high altitude by a carrier aircraft.

On 7 December 2009, Scaled Composites and Virgin Galactic unveiled SpaceShipTwo, along with its atmospheric mothership "Eve". On 13 December 2018, SpaceShipTwo VSS Unity successfully crossed the US-defined boundary of space (although it has not reached space using the internationally recognised definition of this boundary, which lies at a higher altitude than the US boundary). SpaceShipThree is the new spacecraft of Virgin Galactic, launched on 30 March 2021. It is also known as VSS Imagine. On 11 July 2021 VSS Unity completed its first fully crewed mission including Sir Richard Branson.

=== Soviet Union ===
The Mikoyan-Gurevich MiG-105 was an atmospheric prototype of an intended orbital spaceplane, with the suborbital BOR-4 subscale heat shield test vehicle successfully reentering the atmosphere before program cancellation.

=== Japan ===
HYFLEX was a miniaturized suborbital demonstrator launched in 1996, flying to 110 km altitude, achieving hypersonic flight, and successfully reentering the atmosphere.

=== Europe ===
The European Space Agency (ESA) test project Intermediate eXperimental Vehicle (IXV) has demonstrated lifting body reentry technologies during a 100-minute suborbital flight in 2015.

=== Multinational ===
The Dawn Mk-II Aurora is a suborbital spaceplane being developed by Dawn Aerospace to demonstrate multiple suborbital flights per day. Dawn is based in the Netherlands and New Zealand, and is working closely with the American CAA. On 9 December 2020, the Civil Aviation Authority of New Zealand, working alongside the New Zealand Space Agency, issued a license allowing the vehicle to fly from a conventional airport. Early flight testing began with surrogate jet engines, and in July 2021 the company completed a series of five test flights assessing the airframe, avionics and rapid-turnaround operations. Dawn Aerospace

Aurora has since undergone extensive flight testing, including dozens of jet-engine flights and subsequent certification for rocket-powered and supersonic flight. In November 2024, the Mk-II Aurora became the first aircraft designed and manufactured in New Zealand to break the sound barrier, reaching Mach 1.12 and setting a record for the fastest climb to 20 km altitude.

In 2025, Dawn Aerospace began flying commercial and research payloads on Aurora, including space domain awareness sensors and university research instruments, demonstrating the vehicle’s potential for reusable suborbital services.

The company has also started taking orders for the Aurora, with first deliveries expected in 2027, and signed partnerships to base an Aurora spaceplane at the Oklahoma Air & Space Port in the United States.

== Spaceplanes in development ==
=== China ===
The Chinese reusable experimental spacecraft is a clandestine spaceplane that has launched four times between 2020 and 2026, via a Long March 2F.

Shenlong (Chinese: 神龙; pinyin: shén lóng; lit. 'divine dragon') is a Chinese robotic spaceplane that may be similar to the Boeing X-37. Only a few images have been released since late 2007.

Haolong is a reusable uncrewed spaceplane with a 1.8 ton cargo capacity in development by the Chengdu Aircraft Research and Design Institute, developer of the Chengdu J-10 and Chengdu J-20 fighter aircraft, for resupplying the Tiangong space station. It will be 10 meters long and 8 meters wide and will use folding wings.

=== Europe ===
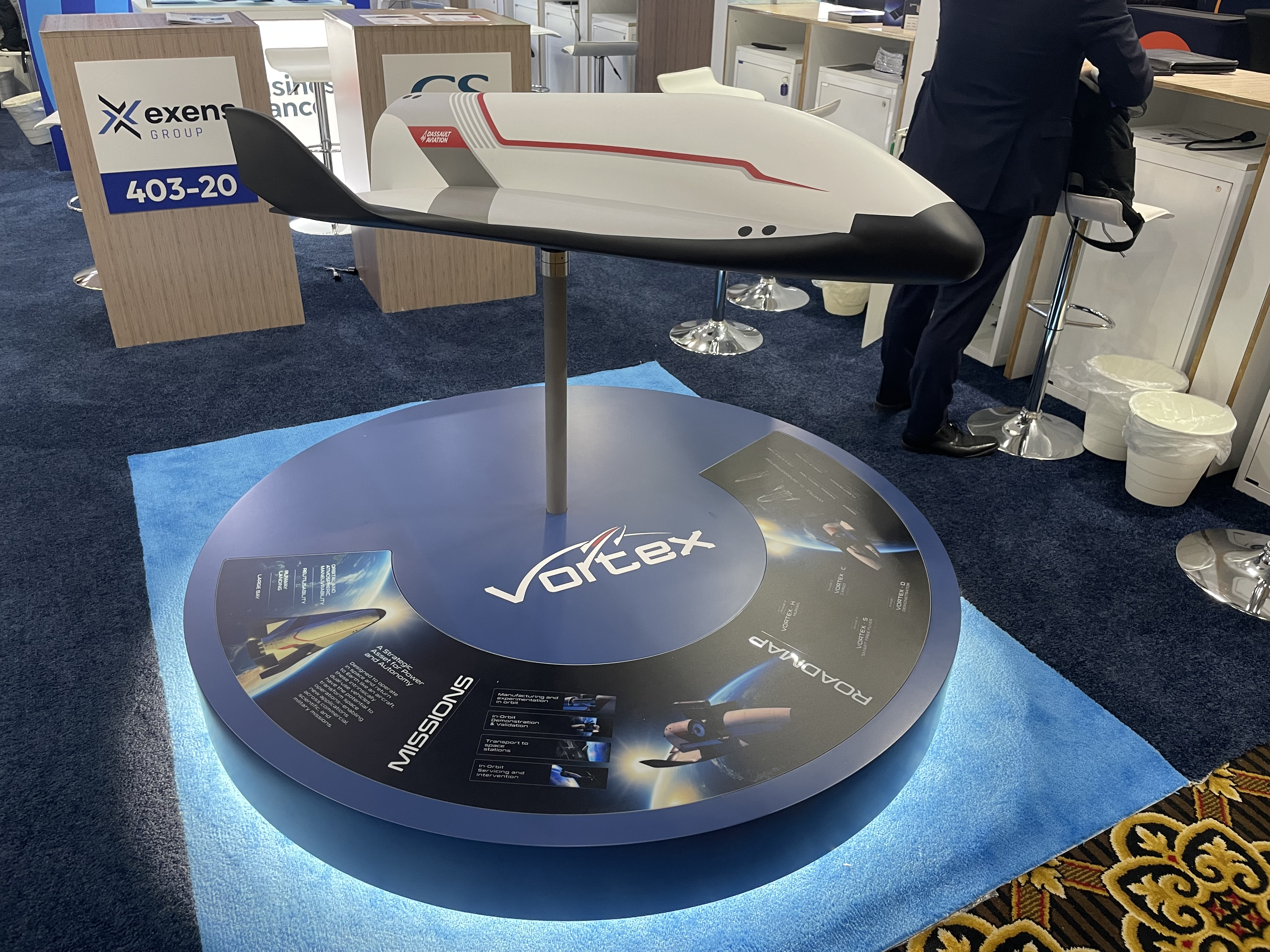
Model of the planned French VORTEX spaceplane

The experience from the IXV project is being used in the PRIDE programme to develop the uncrewed reusable spaceplane Space Rider.

The Space Rider (Space Reusable Integrated Demonstrator for Europe Return) is a planned uncrewed orbital lifting body spaceplane aiming to provide the European Space Agency (ESA) with affordable and routine access to space. Space Rider will have the potential to allow experiments in microgravity, such as exposure of materials to outer space and in-orbit validation of technologies, as well as deployment of small satellites. Its maiden flight is currently scheduled for Q1 2028. It is intended to be put into space by the Vega C medium lift launch vehicle.

The German Space Agency (DLR) is developing the Reusable Flight Experiment (ReFEx) as a demonstrator for a winged reusable rocket first stage. It will be carried by a sounding rocket to apogee of approximately 130 km. Its first flight is expected in 2026.

The German company POLARIS Spaceplanes, in cooperation with DLR, is developing a multipurpose suborbital spaceplane Aurora that can be used for launching payloads into orbit when combined with an expendable upper stage.

Dassault Aviation and OHB are developing an orbital spaceplane called VORTEX (Véhicule Orbital Réutilisable de Transport et d’EXploration) for both civilian and military orbital missions. The company first presented this project at the 2025 Paris Air Show. ESA expressed an interest to cooperate on a scaled down suborbital technology demonstrator version of VORTEX.

French company AndroMach, founded in 2023, is developing small suborbital (ENVOL) and orbital (ÉTOILE) spaceplanes with financial support by CNES.

INVICTUS will be a hypersonic flight test vehicle, enabling technologies for future reusable spaceplanes.

=== India ===
As of 2012, the Indian Space Research Organisation is developing a launch system named the Reusable Launch Vehicle (RLV). It is India's first step towards realizing a two-stage-to-orbit reusable launch system. A space plane serves as the second stage. The plane is expected to have air-breathing scramjet engines as well as rocket engines. Tests with miniature spaceplanes and a working scramjet have been conducted by ISRO in 2016. In April 2023, India successfully conducted an autonomous landing mission of a scaled-down prototype of the spaceplane. The RLV prototype was dropped from a Chinook helicopter at an altitude of 4.5 km and was made to autonomously glide down to a purpose-built runway at the Chitradurga Aeronautical Test Range, Karnataka.

=== Japan ===
As of 2018, Japan is developing the Winged Reusable Sounding rocket (WIRES), which if successful, may be used as a recoverable first-stage or as a crewed sub-orbital spaceplane.

=== United States ===
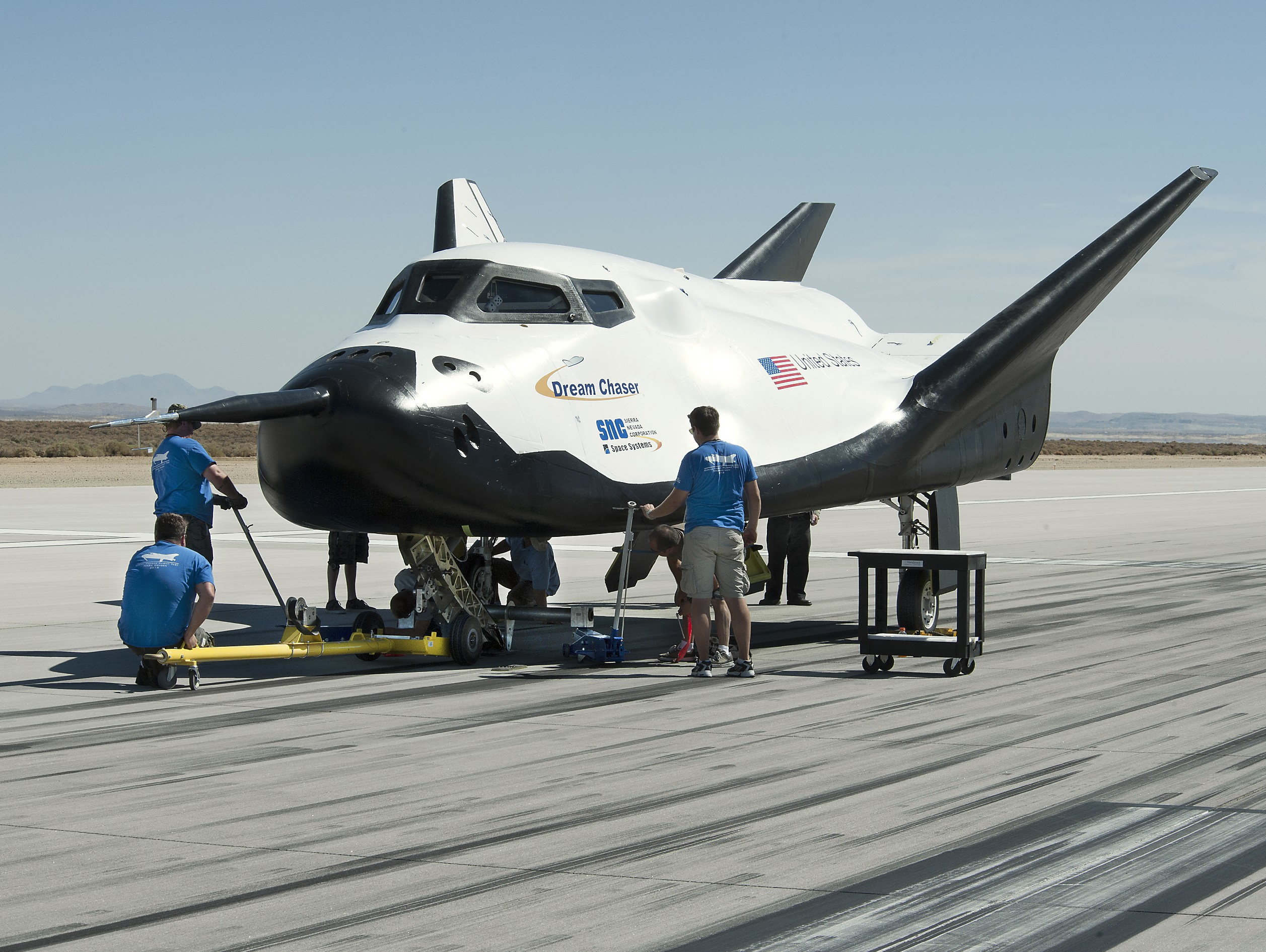
Dream Chaser flight test vehicle in 2013

Dream Chaser is an American reusable lifting-body spaceplane developed by Sierra Space. Conceived as a crewed vehicle, it is being developed in a cargo configuration known as the Dream Chaser Cargo System for missions to the International Space Station (ISS) under NASA's Commercial Resupply Services program.

Development of Dream Chaser began in 2004 as a project of SpaceDev, which was acquired by Sierra Nevada Corporation (SNC) in 2008. In 2021, the program was transferred to Sierra Space, a subsidiary spun off from SNC as an independent company. The first Dream Chaser vehicle, Tenacity, was completed in November 2023.

Dream Chaser is designed for vertical takeoff and horizontal landing, launching atop a Vulcan Centaur rocket and landing on conventional runways. It is capable of carrying both pressurized and unpressurized cargo. A proposed variant for the European Space Agency would launch aboard an Ariane 6 rocket. The first flight of Dream Chaser was originally scheduled for the second flight of Vulcan Centaur but was not ready in time. As of April 2026, the spacecraft's propulsion system and software had not yet been certified by NASA, and the spacecraft's initial mission, SSC Demo-1 in late 2027, will no longer dock at the ISS as originally planned.

The Dream Chaser's design is derived from NASA's HL-20 Personnel Launch System, a lifting-body concept studied in the 1980s and 1990s.

== Unflown spaceplane concepts ==
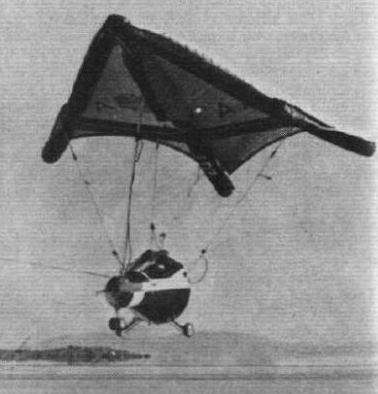
United States Gemini tested the use of a Rogallo wing rather than a parachute. August 1964.

Various types of spaceplanes have been suggested since the early twentieth century. Notable early designs include a spaceplane equipped with wings made of combustible alloys that it would burn during its ascent, and the Silbervogel bomber concept. World War II Germany and the postwar US considered winged versions of the V-2 rocket, and in the 1950s and '60s winged rocket designs inspired science fiction artists, filmmakers, and the general public.

=== United States ===
The U.S. Air Force invested some effort in a paper study of a variety of spaceplane projects under their Aerospaceplane efforts of the late 1950s, but later reduced the scope of the project. The result, the Boeing X-20 Dyna-Soar, was to have been the first orbital spaceplane, but was canceled in the early 1960s in lieu of NASA's Project Gemini and the U.S. Air Force's crewed spaceflight program.

In 1961, NASA originally planned to have the Gemini spacecraft land on a runway with a Rogallo wing airfoil, rather than an ocean landing under parachutes. The test vehicle became known as the Paraglider Research Vehicle. Development work on both parachutes and the paraglider began in 1963. By December 1963, the parachute was ready to undergo full-scale deployment testing, while the paraglider had run into technical difficulties. Though attempts to revive the paraglider concept persisted within NASA and North American Aviation, in 1964 development was definitively discontinued due to the expense of overcoming the technical hurdles.

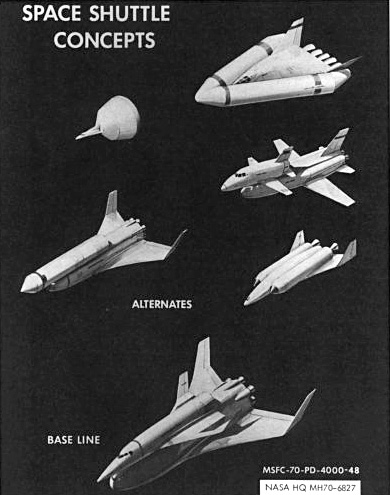
United States STS concepts, circa 1970s

The Space Shuttle underwent many variations during its conceptual design phase. Some early concepts are illustrated.

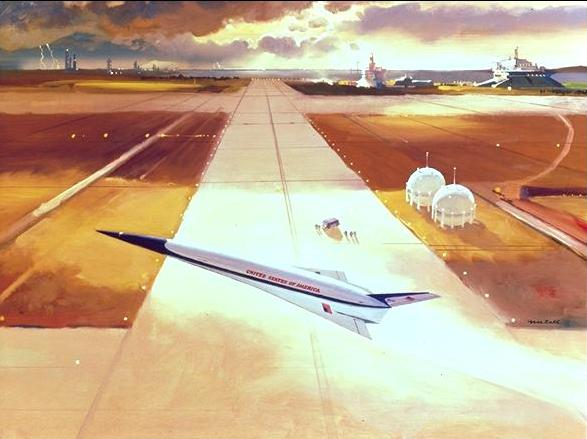
Illustration of NASP taking off

The Rockwell X-30 National Aero-Space Plane (NASP), begun in the 1980s, was an attempt to build a scramjet vehicle capable of operating like an aircraft and achieving orbit like the shuttle. Introduced to the public in 1986, the concept was intended to reach Mach 25, enabling flights between Dulles Airport to Tokyo in two hours, while also being capable of low Earth orbit. Six critical technologies were identified, three relating to the propulsion system, which would consist of a hydrogen-fueled scramjet.

The NASP program became the Hypersonic Systems Technology Program (HySTP) in late 1994. HySTP was designed to transfer the accomplishments made in hypersonic flight into a technology development program. On 27 January 1995 the Air Force terminated participation in (HySTP).

In 1994, a USAF captain proposed an F-16 sized single-stage-to-orbit peroxide/kerosene spaceplane called "Black Horse". It was to take off almost empty and undergo aerial refueling before rocketing to orbit.

The Lockheed Martin X-33 was a 1/3 scale prototype made as part of an attempt by NASA to build a SSTO hydrogen-fuelled spaceplane VentureStar that failed when the hydrogen tank design could not be constructed as intended.

On 5 March 2006, Aviation Week & Space Technology published a story purporting to be the "outing" of a highly classified U.S. military two-stage-to-orbit spaceplane system with the code name Blackstar.

In 2011, Boeing proposed the X-37C, a 165 to 180 percent scale X-37B built to carry up to six passengers to low Earth orbit. The spaceplane was also intended to carry cargo, with both upmass and downmass capacity.

=== Soviet Union ===
The Soviet reusable spacecraft programme has its roots in the late 1950s, at the very beginning of the space age. The idea of Soviet reusable space flight is very old, though it was neither continuous nor consistently organised. Before Buran, no project of the programme reached operational status.

The first step toward a reusable Soviet spacecraft was the 1954 Burya, a high-altitude prototype jet aircraft/cruise missile. Several test flights were made before it was cancelled by order of the Central Committee. The Burya had the goal of delivering a nuclear payload, presumably to the United States, and then returning to base. The Burya programme was cancelled by the USSR in favour of a decision to develop ICBMs instead. The next iteration of a reusable spacecraft was the Zvezda design, which also reached a prototype stage. Decades later, another project with the same name would be used as a service module for the International Space Station. After Zvezda, there was a hiatus in reusable projects until Buran.

The Buran orbital vehicle programme was developed in response to the U.S. Space Shuttle programme, which raised considerable concerns among the Soviet military and especially Defense Minister Dmitry Ustinov. An authoritative chronicler of the Soviet and later Russian space programme, the academic Boris Chertok, recounts how the programme came into being. According to Chertok, after the U.S. developed its Space Shuttle programme, the Soviet military became suspicious that it could be used for military purposes, due to its enormous payload, several times that of previous U.S. launch vehicles. Officially, the Buran orbital vehicle was designed for the delivery to orbit and return to Earth of spacecraft, cosmonauts, and supplies. Both Chertok and Gleb Lozino-Lozinskiy (General Designer and General Director of NPO Molniya) suggest that from the beginning, the programme was military in nature; however, the exact military capabilities, or intended capabilities, of the Buran programme remain classified.

Like its American counterpart, the Buran orbital vehicle, when in transit from its landing sites back to the launch complex, was transported on the back of a large jet aeroplane – the Antonov An-225 Mriya transport aircraft, which was designed in part for this task and was the largest aircraft in the world to fly multiple times. Before the Mriya was ready (after the Buran had flown), the Myasishchev VM-T Atlant, a variant on the Soviet Myasishchev M-4 Molot (Hammer) bomber (NATO code: Bison), fulfilled the same role.

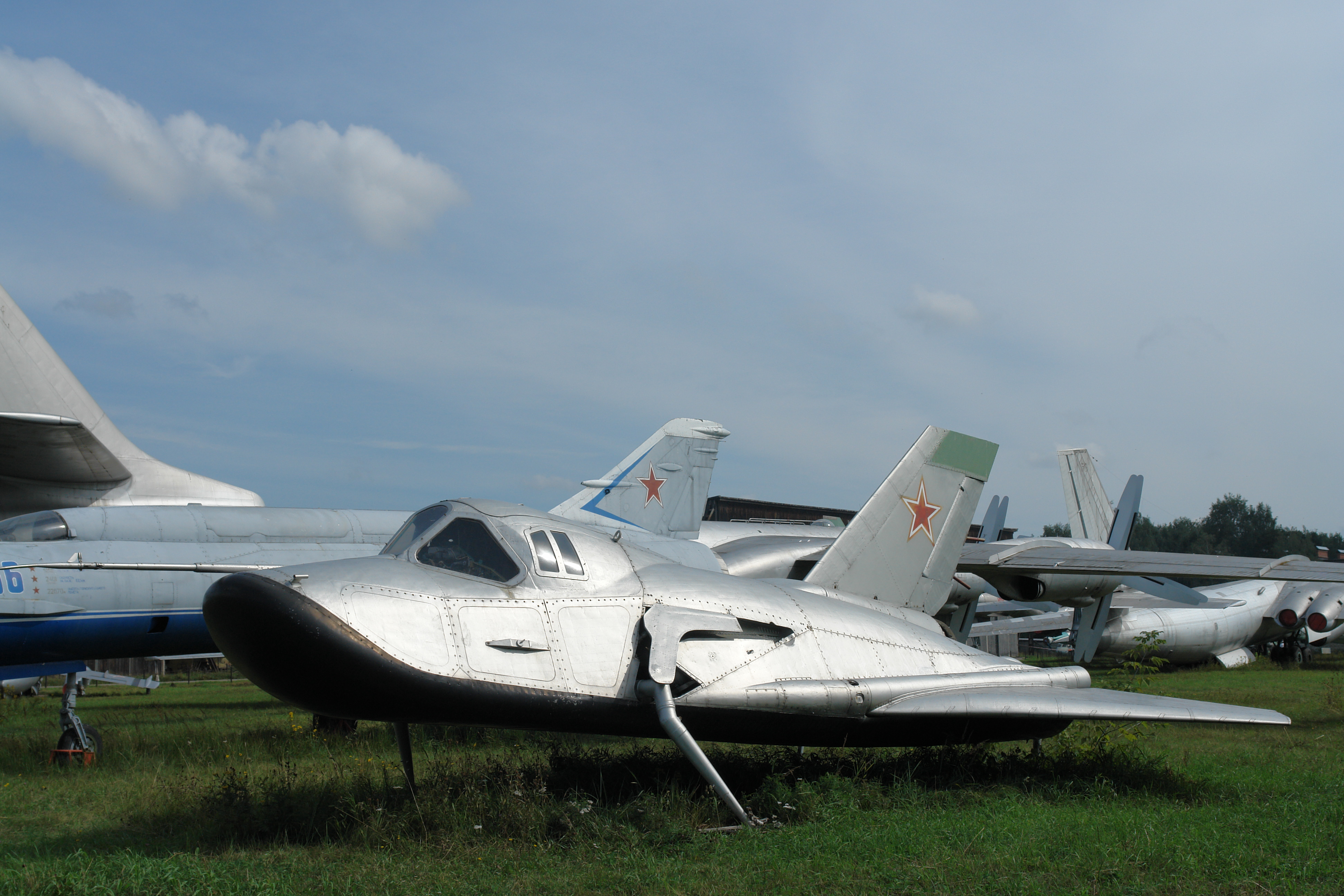
MiG-105 crewed aerodynamics test vehicle

The Soviet Union first considered a preliminary design of rocket-launch small spaceplane Lapotok in early 1960s. The Spiral airspace system with small orbital spaceplane and rocket as second stage was developed in the 1960s–1980s. Mikoyan-Gurevich MiG-105 was a crewed test vehicle to explore low-speed handling and landing.

=== Russia ===
In the early 2000s the orbital 'cosmoplane' (Russian: космоплан) was proposed by Russia's Institute of Applied Mechanics as a passenger transport. According to researchers, it could take about 20 minutes to fly from Moscow to Paris, using hydrogen and oxygen-fueled engines.

=== Europe ===
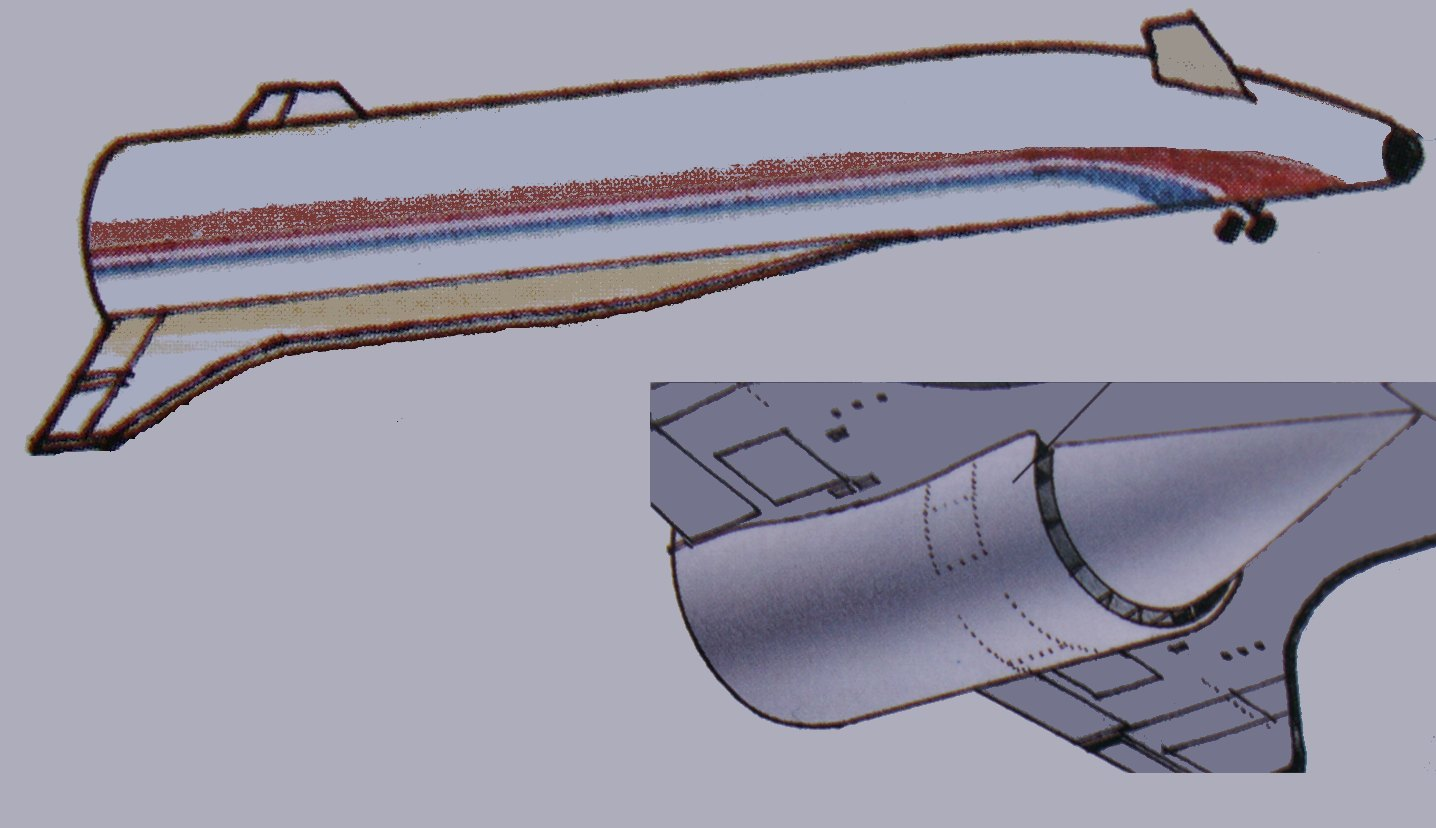
An artist's depiction of HOTOL

The Multi-Unit Space Transport And Recovery Device (MUSTARD) was a concept explored by the British Aircraft Corporation (BAC) around 1968 for launching payloads weighing as much as 2,300 kg (5,000 lb) into orbit. It was never constructed.

In the 1980s, British Aerospace began development of HOTOL, an SSTO spaceplane powered by a revolutionary SABRE air-breathing rocket engine, but the project was canceled due to technical and financial uncertainties. The inventor of SABRE set up Reaction Engines to develop SABRE and proposed a twin-engined SSTO spaceplane called Skylon. One NASA analysis showed possible issues with the hot rocket exhaust plumes causing heating of the tail structure at high Mach numbers. although the CEO of Skylon Enterprises Ltd has claimed that reviews by NASA were "quite positive".

Bristol Spaceplanes has undertaken design and prototyping of three potential spaceplanes since its founding by David Ashford in 1991. The European Space Agency has endorsed these designs on several occasions.

France worked on the Hermes crewed spaceplane launched by Ariane rocket in the late 20th century, and proposed in January 1985 to go through with Hermes development under the auspices of the ESA.

In the 1980s, West Germany funded design work on the MBB Sänger II with the Hypersonic Technology Program. Development continued on MBB/Deutsche Aerospace Sänger II/HORUS until the late 1980s when it was canceled. Germany went on to participate in the Ariane rocket, Columbus space station and Hermes spaceplane of ESA, Spacelab of ESA-NASA and Deutschland missions (non-U.S. funded Space Shuttle flights with Spacelab). The Sänger II had predicted cost savings of up to 30 percent over expendable rockets.

Hopper was one of several proposals for a European reusable launch vehicle (RLV) planned to cheaply ferry satellites into orbit by 2015. One of those was 'Phoenix', a German project which is a one-seventh scale model of the Hopper concept vehicle. The suborbital Hopper was a Future European Space Transportation Investigations Programme system study design A test project, the Intermediate eXperimental Vehicle (IXV), has demonstrated lifting reentry technologies and will be extended under the PRIDE programme.

The FAST20XX Future High-Altitude High Speed Transport 20XX aimed to establish sound technological foundations for the introduction of advanced concepts in suborbital high-speed transportation with air-launch-to-orbit ALPHA vehicle.

The Daimler-Chrysler Aerospace RLV is a small reusable spaceplane prototype for the ESA Future Launchers Preparatory Programme programme. SpaceLiner is the most recent project.

Airbus Defence and Space Spaceplane was a suborbital spaceplane concept for carrying space tourists, proposed by EADS Astrium in 2007.

=== Japan ===
HOPE was a Japanese experimental spaceplane project designed by a partnership between NASDA and NAL (both now part of JAXA), started in the 1980s. It was positioned for most of its lifetime as one of the main Japanese contributions to the International Space Station, the other being the Japanese Experiment Module. The project was eventually cancelled in 2003, by which point test flights of a sub-scale testbed had flown successfully.

=== India ===
AVATAR (Aerobic Vehicle for Hypersonic Aerospace Transportation; Sanskrit: अवतार) was a concept study for an uncrewed single-stage reusable spaceplane capable of horizontal takeoff and landing, presented to India's Defence Research and Development Organisation. The mission concept was for low cost military and commercial satellite launches.

== See also ==
- Ansari X Prize
- List of crewed spacecraft
- List of space launch system designs

== Bibliography ==
- Hacker, Barton C.; Grimwood, James M. (1977). On the Shoulders of Titans: A History of Project Gemini. Washington, D.C.: NASA. OCLC 3821896. NASA SP-4203. Archived from the original on 7 December 2003.
- Kuczera, Heribert; Sacher, Peter W. (2011). Reusable Space Transportation Systems. Berlin: Springer. ISBN 978-3-540-89180-2.
