= Rocketplane Kistler =

American reusable launch vehicle company

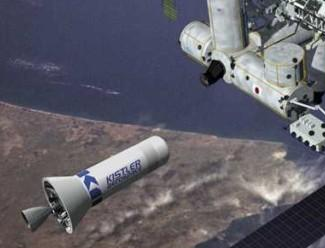
Computer rendering of K-1 launch vehicle (left) approaching the International Space Station (right)

Rocketplane Kistler (RpK) was a reusable launch system firm originally based in Oklahoma. It was formed in 2006 after Rocketplane Limited, Inc. acquired Kistler Aerospace. NASA announced that Rocketplane Kistler had been chosen to develop crew and cargo launch services. However, having missed financial milestones, NASA terminated funding for the project. It filed for chapter 7 bankruptcy in 2010.

== K-1 launch vehicle ==
Rocketplane Kistler's primary project was the K-1, a reusable launch vehicle which was intended to get as high as geosynchronous orbit, and was hoped to compete with relatively expensive, one-shot rockets for servicing of the International Space Station.

== Corporate history ==
Kistler Aerospace was founded in Kirkland, Washington by Walter Kistler and Bob Citron in 1993 as a private company attempting to develop fully reusable vehicles capable of earth orbit at a minimal price. Rob Meyerson, who later went on to become President of Blue Origin, was a Senior Manager at Kistler Aerospace from 1997 to 2003. The CEO was George Mueller, who previously had been a leader of NASA's Apollo Program.

In February 2006, Kistler was purchased by the majority owner of Rocketplane Limited, Inc, a competing reusable, private spacecraft firm. Kistler Aerospace continued to operate until its closure under the name Rocketplane Kistler. Meanwhile, Rocketplane Limited, Inc. changed its name to Rocketplane Global, Inc., with a third company, Rocketplane, Inc. set up as a parent company for the two.

=== NASA launch partnership ===
In August 2006, NASA announced that Rocketplane Kistler had been chosen, along with SpaceX, to develop crew and cargo launch services, aka Commercial Orbital Transportation Services (COTS), for the International Space Station. The plan called for demonstration flights between 2008 and 2010. Rocketplane Kistler would receive up to $207 million if they met all NASA milestones.

In November 2006, Rocketplane Kistler and Alliant Techsystems announced that Alliant Techsystems would become the lead contractor for Rocketplane Kistler's K-1 launch vehicle.

=== Unmet financial milestones in 2006 and 2007 ===
In September 2006, Rocketplane Kistler began to miss financial milestones associated with the COTS agreement, and requested and received from NASA a 30-day extension on the milestone for completing its $40 million initial financing round. In February 2007 RpK renegotiated its COTS agreement, agreeing to raise the $500 million of required private financing before the end of May.

By August 2007, RpK had failed to obtain that financing, forcing them to cut their workforce.

On September 7, 2007, NASA notified Rocketplane Kistler that the COTS agreement would be terminated in 30 days due to continued inability to meet its financial milestones. NASA announced in October 2007 that it had terminated funding for the project.

=== Retrenchment ===
Due to financial difficulties, the company had laid off most of its employees by February 2009, and consolidated business operations in Wisconsin, the home state of the company president.

Rocketplane Inc., along with its subsidiaries, Rocketplane Kistler and Rocketplane Global, failed to deliver on promises to Oklahomans and—financially broke—left the state in 2009. "The company collected $18 million in state tax breaks, but its Rocketplane XP spacecraft never materialized. [The] company closed its Oklahoma City headquarters and relinquished its hangar at Burns Flat."

=== Bankruptcy ===
On June 15, 2010, Rocketplane Inc., as well as its subsidiaries and its CEO, George French, filed for chapter 7 bankruptcy. After 17 years of attempted development, the bankruptcy paperwork for Rocketplane Kistler listed $108,250 in assets including hardware and tooling for the K-1 rocket, as well as many unvalued patents and trademarks pertaining to the rocket. Secured liabilities were claimed at $3.7 million, with unsecured liabilities listed at just under $3.7 million, as well.

=== Kistler Space Systems ===
In December 2011 all of the assets of Rocketplane Kistler were acquired by Space Assets LLC, and a new company, Kistler Space Systems, was founded. As of mid-2020 the company's website seems to have been abandoned.

== See also ==
- Rocketplane Global Inc.
- Rocketplane XP
