= Boost-glide =

Glide and reentry methods to use aerodynamic lift in the upper atmosphere

Phases of a skip reentry

Boost-glide, or skip-glide, is a class of atmospheric entry trajectories that follow a non-ballistic trajectory by employing aerodynamic lift in the high upper atmosphere. The term is mostly used to refer to a number of designs that used lift to extend the range of an otherwise shorter-ranged rocket.

Skip is a flight trajectory where the spacecraft goes in and out the atmosphere. Glide is a flight trajectory where the spacecraft stays in the atmosphere for a sustained flight period of time. In most examples, a skip reentry roughly doubles the range of suborbital spaceplanes and reentry vehicles over the purely ballistic trajectory. In others, a series of skips allows the range to be further extended.

Boost-glide entry was first seriously studied as a way to extend the range of ballistic missiles, but was not used operationally in this form as conventional missiles with extended range were introduced. The underlying aerodynamic concepts have been used to produce maneuverable reentry vehicles (MARV), to increase the accuracy of some missiles like the Pershing II. More recently, the concepts have been used to produce hypersonic glide vehicles (HGV) to avoid interception as in the case of the Avangard. The range-extension is used as a way to allow flights at lower altitudes, helping avoid radar detection for a longer time compared to a higher ballistic path.

The concept has also been used to extend the reentry time for vehicles returning to Earth from the Moon, which would otherwise have to shed a large amount of velocity in a short time and thereby suffer very high heating rates. The Apollo Command Module also used what is essentially a skip re-entry, as did the Soviet Zond and Chinese Chang'e 5-T1.

== History ==
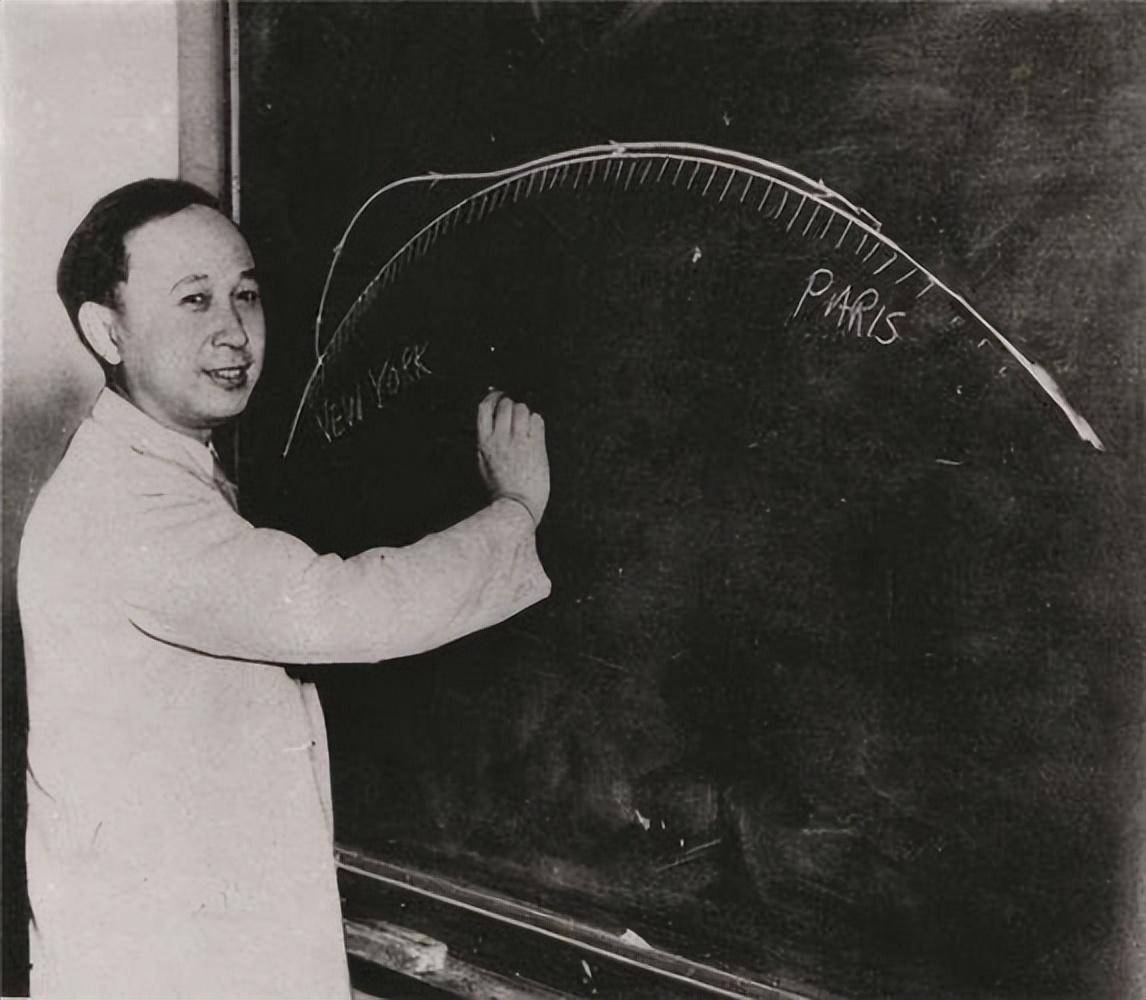
Qian Xuesen describing an intercontinental spaceplane trajectory, 1940s.

=== Early concepts ===
The conceptual basis was first noticed by German artillery officers, who found that their Peenemünder Pfeilgeschosse arrow shells traveled much further when fired from higher altitudes. This was not entirely unexpected due to geometry and thinner air, but when these factors were accounted for, they still could not explain the much greater ranges being seen. Investigations at Peenemünde led them to discover that the longer trajectories in the thinner high-altitude air resulted in the shell having an angle of attack that produced aerodynamic lift at supersonic speeds. At the time this was considered highly undesirable because it made the trajectory very difficult to calculate, but its possible application for extending range was not lost on the observers.

In June 1939, Kurt Patt of Klaus Riedel's design office at Peenemünde proposed wings for converting rocket speed and altitude into aerodynamic lift and range. He calculated that this would roughly double range of the A-4 rockets from 275 kilometres (171 mi) to about 550 kilometres (340 mi). Early development was considered under the A-9 name, although little work other than wind tunnel studies at the Zeppelin-Staaken company would be carried out during the next few years. Low-level research continued until 1942 when it was cancelled.

The earliest known proposal for the boost-glide concept for truly long-range use dates to the 1941 Silbervogel, a proposal by Eugen Sänger for a rocket powered bomber able to attack New York City from bases in Germany then fly on for landing somewhere in the Pacific Ocean held by the Empire of Japan. The idea would be to use the vehicle's wings to generate lift and pull up into a new ballistic trajectory, exiting the atmosphere again and giving the vehicle time to cool off between the skips. It was later demonstrated that the heating load during the skips was much higher than initially calculated, and would have melted the spacecraft.

In 1943, the A-9 work was dusted off again, this time under the name A-4b. It has been suggested this was either because it was now based on an otherwise unmodified A-4, or because the A-4 program had "national priority" by this time, and placing the development under the A-4 name guaranteed funding. A-4b used swept wings in order to extend the range of the V2 enough to allow attacks on UK cities in the Midlands or to reach London from areas deeper within Germany. The A-9 was originally similar, but later featured long ogival delta shaped wings instead of the more conventional swept ones. This design was adapted as a crewed upper stage for the A-9/A-10 intercontinental missile, which would glide from a point over the Atlantic with just enough range to bomb New York before the pilot bailed out. (Note: Yengst's chronology of the A-series weapons differs considerably from most accounts. For instance, he suggests the A-9 and A-10 were two completely separate developments, as opposed to the upper and lower stages of a single ICBM design. He also states that the A-4b was the SLBM development, as opposed to the winged A-4.)

=== Post-war development ===
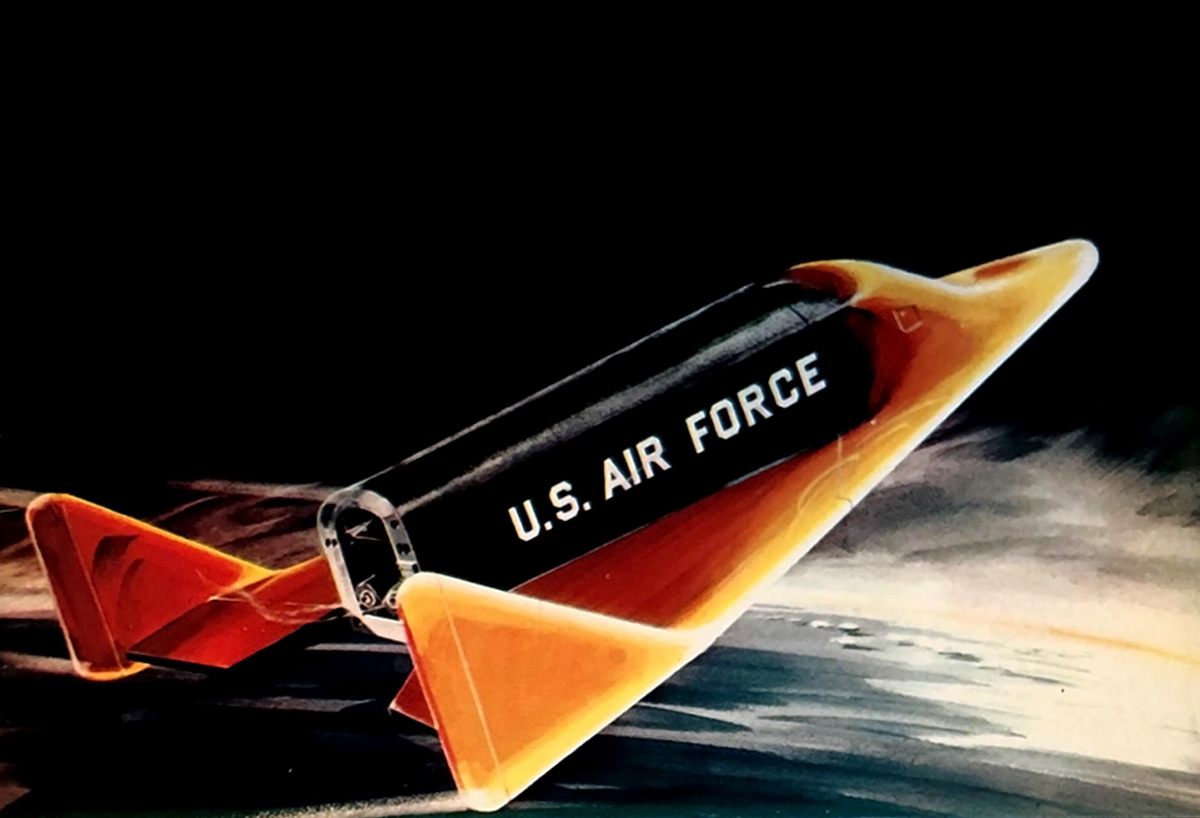
To date, the X-20 Dyna Soar is the project that has come closest to actually building a crewed boost-glide vehicle. This illustration shows the Dyna Soar during reentry.

In the immediate post-war era, Soviet rocket engineer Aleksei Isaev found a copy of an updated August 1944 report on the Silbervogel concept. He had the paper translated to Russian, and it eventually came to the attention of Joseph Stalin who was intensely interested in the concept of an antipodal bomber. In 1946, he sent his son Vasily Stalin and scientist Grigori Tokaty, who had also worked on winged rockets before the war, to visit Sänger and Irene Bredt in Paris and attempt to convince them to join a new effort in the Soviet Union. Sänger and Bredt turned down the invitation.

In November 1946, the Soviets formed the NII-1 design bureau under Mstislav Keldysh to develop their own version without Sänger and Bredt. Their early work convinced them to convert from a rocket powered hypersonic skip-glide concept to a ramjet powered supersonic cruise missile, not unlike the Navaho being developed in the United States during the same period. Development continued for a time as the Keldysh bomber, but improvements in conventional ballistic missiles ultimately rendered the project unnecessary. (Note: Navaho met the same fate in 1958, when it was cancelled in favor of the Atlas missile.)

In the United States, the skip-glide concept was advocated by many of the German scientists who moved there, primarily Walter Dornberger and Krafft Ehricke at Bell Aircraft. In 1952, Bell proposed a bomber concept that was essentially a vertical launch version of Silbervogel known as Bomi. This led to a number of follow-on concepts during the 1950s, including Robo, Hywards, Brass Bell, and ultimately the Boeing X-20 Dyna-Soar. Earlier designs were generally bombers, while later models were aimed at reconnaissance or other roles. Dornberger and Ehricke also collaborated on a 1955 Popular Science article pitching the idea for airliner use.

The introduction of successful intercontinental ballistic missiles (ICBMs) in the offensive role ended any interest in the skip-glide bomber concepts, as did the reconnaissance satellite for the spyplane roles. The X-20 space fighter saw continued interest through the 1960s, but was ultimately the victim of budget cuts; after another review in March 1963, Robert McNamara canceled the program in December, noting that after $400 million had been spent they still had no mission for it to fulfill.

=== Missile use ===
Through the 1960s, the skip-glide concept saw interest not as a way to extend range, which was no longer a concern with modern missiles, but as the basis for maneuverable reentry vehicles for ICBMs. The primary goal was to have the RV change its path during reentry so that anti-ballistic missiles (ABMs) would not be able to track their movements rapidly enough for a successful interception. The first known example was the Alpha Draco tests of 1959, followed by the Boost Glide Reentry Vehicle (BGRV) test series, ASSET and PRIME.

This research was eventually put to use in the Pershing II's MARV reentry vehicle. In this case, there is no extended gliding phase; the warhead uses lift only for short periods to adjust its trajectory. This is used late in the reentry process, combining data from a Singer Kearfott inertial navigation system with a Goodyear Aerospace active radar. Similar concepts have been developed for most nuclear-armed nations' theatre ballistic missiles.

The Soviet Union had also invested some effort in the development of MARV to avoid US ABMs, but the closure of the US defenses in the 1970s meant there was no reason to continue this program. Things changed in the 2000s with the introduction of the US's Ground-Based Midcourse Defense, which led Russia to reanimate this work. The vehicle, referred to as Object 4202 in the Soviet era, was reported in October 2016 to have had a successful test. The system was revealed publicly on 1 March 2018 as the hypersonic glide vehicle (HGV) Avangard (Russian: Авангард; English: Vanguard), which officially entered active service as an ICBM payload on 27 December 2019. Vladimir Putin announced that Avangard had entered serial production, claiming that its maneuverability makes it invulnerable to all current missile defences.

China has also developed a boost-glide warhead, the DF-ZF (known to US intelligence as "WU-14"). In contrast to the US and Russian MARV designs, the DF-ZF's primary goal is to use boost-glide to extend range while flying at lower altitudes than would be used to reach the same target using a purely ballistic path. This is intended to keep it out of the sight of the US Navy's Aegis Combat System radars as long as possible, and thereby decrease the time that system has to respond to an attack. DF-ZF was officially unveiled on 1 October 2019. Similar efforts by Russia led to the Kholod and GLL-8 Igla hypersonic test projects, and more recently the Yu-71 hypersonic glide vehicle which can be carried by RS-28 Sarmat.

Boost-glide became the topic of some interest as a possible solution to the US Prompt Global Strike (PGS) requirement, which seeks a weapon that can hit a target anywhere on the Earth within one hour of launch from the United States. PGS does not define the mode of operation, and current studies include Advanced Hypersonic Weapon boost-glide warhead, Falcon HTV-2 hypersonic aircraft, and submarine-launched missiles. Lockheed Martin is developing this concept as the hypersonic AGM-183A ARRW.

=== Reentry vehicle use ===
The technique was used by the Soviet Zond series of circumlunar spacecraft, which used one skip before landing. In this case a true skip was required in order to allow the spacecraft to reach the higher-latitude landing areas. Zond 6, Zond 7 and Zond 8 made successful skip entries, although Zond 5 did not. The Chang'e 5-T1, which flew mission profiles similar to Zond, also used this technique.

The Apollo Command Module used a skip-like concept to lower the heating loads on the vehicle by extending the re-entry time, but the spacecraft did not leave the atmosphere again and there has been considerable debate whether this makes it a true skip profile. NASA referred to it simply as "lifting entry". A true multi-skip profile was considered as part of the Apollo Skip Guidance concept, but this was not used on any crewed flights. The concept continues to appear on more modern vehicles like the Orion spacecraft, which made the first American skip entry in the Artemis 1 mission, using onboard computers.

== Flight mechanics ==
Using simplified equations of motion and assuming that during the atmospheric flight both drag and lift forces will be much larger than the gravity force acting on the vehicle, the following analytical relations for a skip reentry flight can be derived:

$$\gamma_\mathrm{F} = -\gamma_\mathrm{E},$$

where $\gamma$ is the flightpath angle relative to the local horizontal, the subscript E indicates the conditions at the start of the entry and the subscript F indicates the conditions at the end of the entry flight.

The velocity $V$ before and after the entry can be derived to relate as follows:

$$\frac{V_\mathrm{F}}{V_\mathrm{E}} = \exp{\frac{2 \gamma_\mathrm{E}}{L/D}},$$

where $L/D$ is the lift-to-drag ratio of the vehicle.

== See also ==
- High Speed Strike Weapon (HSSW) (USA)
- DF-ZX (China)
- DF-17 (China)
- Prompt Global Strike (PGS) (USA)
- Alpha Draco (USA)
- ArcLight (missile) (USA)
- DARPA Falcon Project (USA)
- Boeing X-51 Waverider (USA)
- North American X-15 (USA)
- Tupolev Tu-130 (Russia)
- BrahMos-II (India / Russia)
- Hypersonic Technology Demonstrator Vehicle (India)
- Multiple independently targetable reentry vehicle
- Planar reentry equations
