= Hypersonic flight =

Flight faster than Mach 5 below 90 km

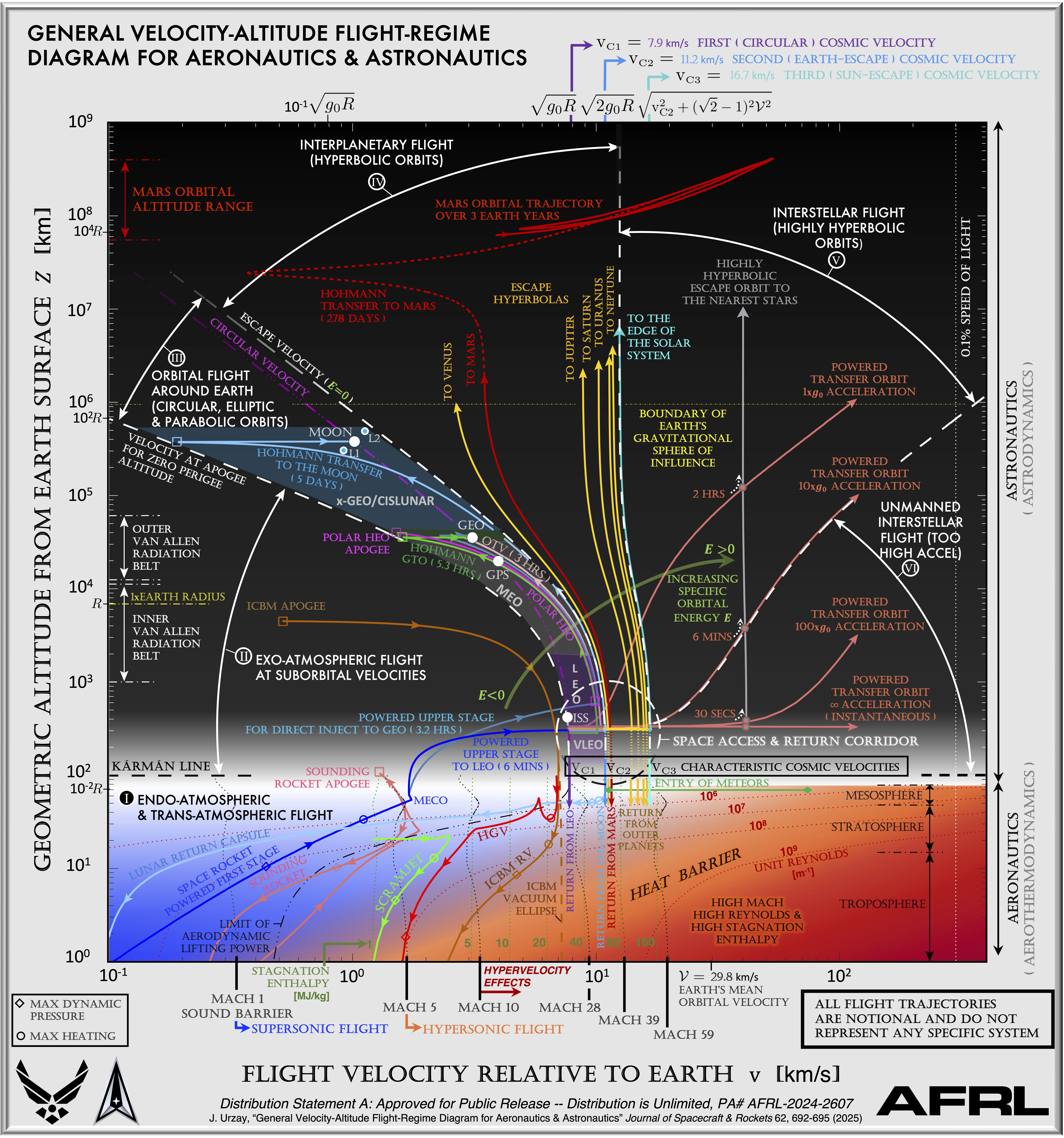
Velocity-altitude diagram showing different flight regimes: 1) endo-atmospheric and trans-atmospheric flight (including subsonic, supersonic and hypersonic flight); 2) exo-atmospheric flight at suborbital velocities; 3) orbital flight around Earth (circular, elliptic, and parabolic orbits); 4) interplanetary flight (hyperbolic orbits); 5) interstellar flight (highly hyperbolic orbits); and 6) unmanned interstellar flight (too high accelerations).

Hypersonic flight refers to the motion of aircraft, missiles, or spacecraft through the atmosphere below the Karman line at speeds greater than Mach 5, above which thermochemical effects and aerodynamic heat loads become significant.

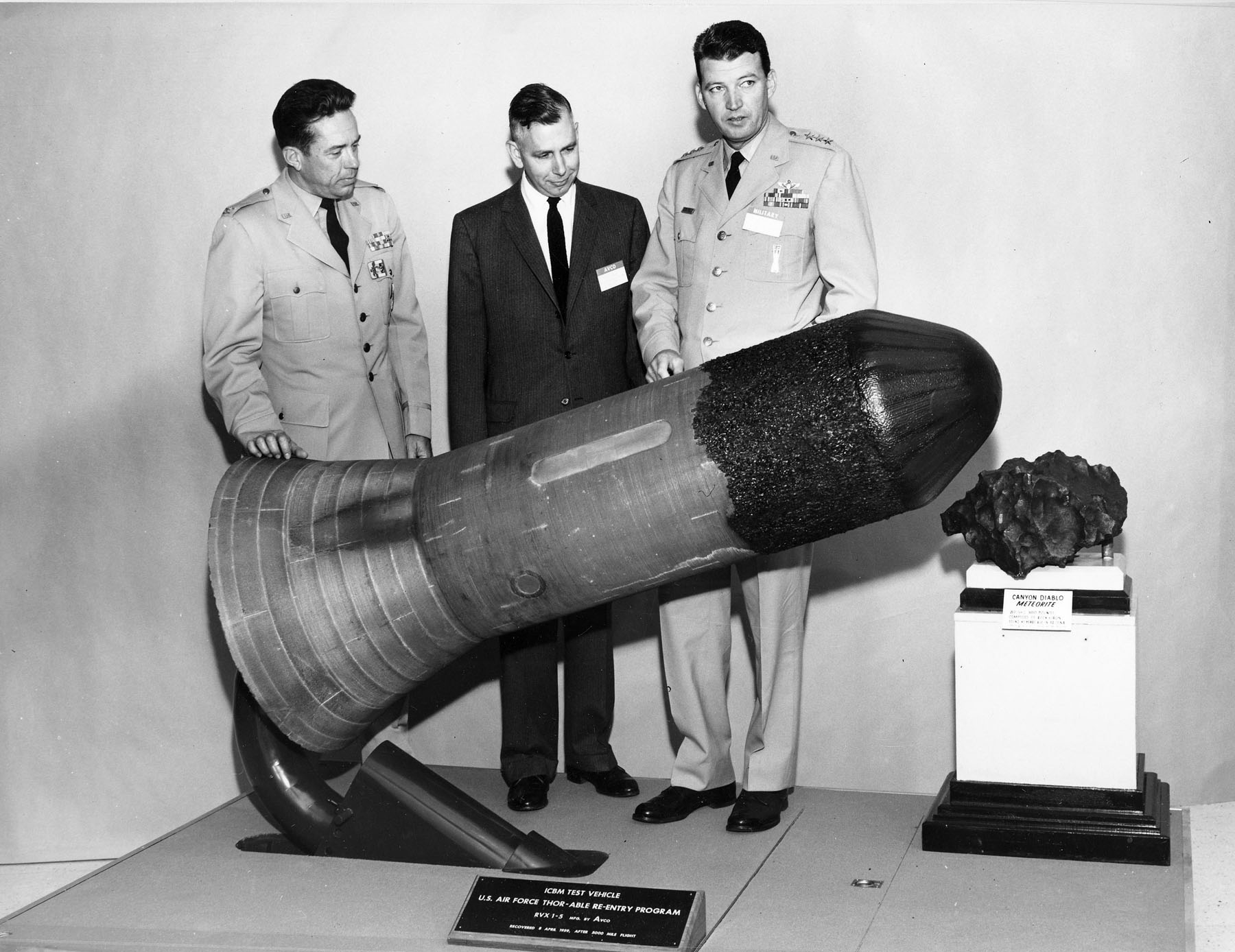
Reentry vehicle (RV) after an 8,000-kilometre (5,000 mi) flight, 1959. Note the blackened tip of the RV due to aerodynamic heating. Compare to the aerodynamic heating effect on the iron meteorite on the right.

== History ==
The first manufactured object to achieve hypersonic flight was the two-stage Bumper rocket, consisting of a WAC Corporal second stage set on top of a V-2 first stage. In February 1949, at White Sands, the rocket reached a speed of 8,290 km/h (5,150 mph), or about Mach 6.7. The vehicle burned up on re-entry, and only charred remnants survived.

In April 1961, Russian Yuri Gagarin became the first human to travel at hypersonic speed, during the world's first piloted orbital flight. Soon after, in May 1961, American Alan Shepard became the first American and second human to fly hypersonic when his capsule reentered the atmosphere at a speed above Mach 5 at the end of his suborbital flight over the Atlantic Ocean.

In November 1961, American Robert White flew the X-15 research aircraft at speeds over Mach 6. On 3 October 1967, in California, an X-15 reached Mach 6.7.

A key technology for hypersonic flight is the Scramjet. The NASA X-43A flew on scramjet for 10 seconds, and then glided for 10 minutes on its last flight in 2004. The Boeing X-51 Waverider flew on scramjet for 210 seconds in 2013, reaching Mach 5.1 on its fourth flight test.

Space vehicle reentry was extensively studied. The hypersonic regime is the subject of development during the 21st century, amid strategic competition between the United States, India, Russia, and China.

== Physics ==
=== Stagnation point ===
The stagnation point of air flowing around a body is a point where its local velocity is zero. At this spot, moving air flows around this location. A shock wave forms, which deflects the air from the stagnation point and insulates the flight body from the atmosphere. This can affect the lifting ability of a flight surface, needed to counteract its drag and subsequent free fall. (Note: Ning describes a method for interrelating Reynolds number with Mach number.)

In order to maneuver in the atmosphere at beyond supersonic speeds, propulsion can still use airbreathing systems, but a ramjet is not sufficient to attain Mach 5, as a ramjet slows the airflow to subsonic speed. Systems such as waveriders use a (first stage) rocket to boost a body into the hypersonic regime. Boost-glide vehicles use scramjets after their initial boost, in which the speed of the air passing through the scramjet remains supersonic. Munitions typically use a cannon for their initial boost.

=== High temperature effect ===
Hypersonic flow is a high energy flow. The ratio of kinetic energy to the internal energy of the gas increases as the square of the Mach number. When this flow enters a boundary layer, high viscous effects appear due to the friction between air and the speeding object. In this case, the kinetic energy is converted in part to internal energy and gas energy is proportional to the internal energy. Therefore, hypersonic boundary layers are high temperature regions due to the viscous dissipation of the flow's kinetic energy. Another region of high temperature flow is the shock layer behind the strong bow shock wave. In the case of the shock layer, the flow's velocity decreases discontinuously as it passes through the shock wave. This results in a loss of kinetic energy and a gain of internal energy behind the shock wave. Due to high temperatures behind the shock wave, dissociation of molecules in the air becomes significant. For example, for air at T > 2,000 K (1,730 °C; 3,140 °F), dissociation of diatomic oxygen into oxygen radicals is active: O_{2} → 2O) For T > 4,000 K (3,730 °C; 6,740 °F), dissociation of diatomic nitrogen into N radicals is active: N_{2} → 2N Consequently, in this temperature range, a plasma forms: —molecular dissociation followed by recombination of oxygen and nitrogen radicals produces nitric oxide: N_{2} + O_{2} → 2NO, which then dissociates and recombines to form ions: N + O → NO^{+} + e^{−}

=== Low density flow ===
At standard sea-level condition for air, the mean free path of air molecules is about $\lambda = 68 \,\mathrm{nm}$. At an altitude of 104 km (65 mi), where the air is thinner, the mean free path is $\lambda = 1 \, \mathrm{ft} = 0.305 \, \mathrm{m}$. Because of this, large free mean path aerodynamic concepts, equations, and results based on the assumption of a continuum, begin to break down, forcing consideration of aerodynamics from kinetic theory. This regime of aerodynamics is called low-density flow. For a given aerodynamic condition low-density effects depend on the value of a nondimensional parameter called the Knudsen number $\mathrm{Kn}$, defined as $\mathrm{Kn}=\frac{\lambda}{l}$ where $l$ is the typical length scale of the object considered. The value of the Knudsen number based on nose radius, $\mathrm{Kn}=\frac{\lambda}{R}$, can be near one.

Hypersonic vehicles frequently fly at high altitudes and therefore encounter low-density conditions. Hence, the design and analysis of hypersonic vehicles sometimes require consideration of low-density flow. New generations of hypersonic airplanes may spend a considerable portion of their mission at high altitudes, and for these vehicles, low-density effects will become more significant.

=== Thin shock layer ===
The flow field between the shock wave and the body surface is called the shock layer. As the Mach number M increases, the angle of the resulting shock wave decreases. This Mach angle is described as $\mu = \sin^{-1} (a/v)$ where a is the speed of the sound wave and v is the flow velocity. Since M=v/a, the equation becomes $\mu = \sin^{-1} (1/M)$. Higher Mach numbers position the shock wave closer to the body surface, thus at hypersonic speeds, the shock wave lies close to the body surface, resulting in a thin shock layer. At low Reynolds number, the boundary layer is thick and merges with the shock wave, leading to a viscous shock layer.

=== Viscous interaction ===
The compressible flow boundary layer increases proportionately to the square of the Mach number, and inversely to the square root of the Reynolds number.

At hypersonic speeds, this effect becomes much more pronounced, due to the exponential impact of the Mach number. Since the boundary layer becomes so large, it interacts more viscously with the surrounding flow. The overall effect of this interaction is to create much higher skin friction than normal, causing greater surface heat flow. Additionally, surface pressure spikes, which results in a much larger aerodynamic drag coefficient. This effect is extreme at the leading edge and decreases as a function of length along the surface.

=== Entropy layer ===
The entropy layer is a region of large velocity gradients caused by the strong curvature of the shock wave. The entropy layer begins at the nose of the aircraft and extends downstream close to the body surface. Downstream of the nose, the entropy layer interacts with the boundary layer which causes an increase in aerodynamic body surface heating. Although the shock wave at the nose at supersonic speeds is also curved, the entropy layer is only observed at hypersonic speeds because the magnitude of the curve is far greater at hypersonic speeds.

== Propulsion ==
=== Controlled detonation ===
Researchers in China used shock waves in a detonation chamber to compress ionized argon plasma waves moving at Mach 14. The waves were directed into magnetohydrodynamic (MHD) generators to create a current pulse that could be increased to gigawatt scale, given enough argon gas.

=== Rotating detonation ===
Conceptual animation of RDE flow field by Oak Ridge National Laboratory.

A rotating detonation engine (RDE) uses a form of pressure gain combustion, where one or more detonations continuously travel around an annular channel. Computational simulations and experimental results have shown that the RDE has potential in transport and other applications.

In detonative combustion, the flame front expands at supersonic speed. It is theoretically up to 25% more efficient than conventional deflagrative combustion, potentially enabling increased fuel efficiency.

Disadvantages include instability and noise.

=== Hybrid ===
Companies such as Hermeus, Venus Aerospace, and AstroMechanica are developing hybrid engines capable of operating from subsonic to hypersonic speeds.

Hybrid engines
Company	0-3	3-4	5+
Hermeus	Precooled P&W F100 turbojet	Dive	Ramjet
Venus Aerospace	Rotating detonation	Ramjet	Ramjet
AstroMechanica	Turbofan	Turbojet	Ramjet

== Applications ==
=== Shipping ===
See: SR-72, § Mayhem

Transport consumes energy for three purposes: overcoming gravity, overcoming air/water friction, and achieving terminal velocity. Hypersonics addresses all three. Proponents claim that the net energy costs of hypersonic transport can be lower than those of conventional transport while slashing journey times.

Stratolaunch Roc has been used to test hypersonic aircraft.

Hermeus demonstrated transition from turbojet operation to ramjet operation on 17 November 2022, without using a rocket or scramjet.

=== Weapons ===
Hypersonic weapon, demonstrating its non-parabolic trajectory (denoted in red), has a distinctive signature which is being tracked by one of the layers of the National Defense Space Architecture (§ NDSA) beginning in 2021. Tranche 0 is to begin deployment in 2022.: The satellites of the NDSA, in gray, are to be deployed in constellations orbiting Earth, and constantly keep Earth in their view, depicted by the blue cones representing the fields of view of the satellite constellations. The satellites are to intercommunicate and serve the defensive systems arrayed against enemy hypersonic vehicles, and build a kill chain against them.; Conversely, the same satellites can be used to track friendly hypersonic weapons and perform battle damage assessment of their strikes against targets. See JADC2 (Joint all-domain command and control)

Two main types of hypersonic weapons are hypersonic cruise missiles and hypersonic glide vehicles. (Note: "[N]on-nuclear capabilities may be able to complement nuclear forces in strategic deterrence plans"—The 2022 Nuclear Posture Review as cited by Loren Thompson. Thus non-nuclear hypersonics serve as proportionate deterrent layers in the defense strategy of the United States.) Scramjet-powered hypersonic cruise missiles are limited to below 30 km (19 mi); (Note: According to Alex Hollings, as 21 March 2022 no nation has yet successfully fielded a scramjet-powered hypersonic cruise missile, including Russia's 3M22 Zircon. However, tests of DARPA's Hypersonic Air-breathing Weapon Concept (HAWC) have now succeeded, using designs by two different vendors in September 2021, and March 2022 respectively.) while hypersonic glide vehicles can travel higher.

Hypersonic vehicles travel much slower than ballistic (i.e. sub-orbital or fractional orbital) missiles, because they travel in the atmosphere, while ballistic missiles travel in the vacuum above the atmosphere. However, they can use the atmosphere to manoeuvre, enabling large-angle deviations from a ballistic trajectory. Hypersonic glide vehicles are typically launched with a ballistic first stage, then deploys wings and switch to hypersonic flight upon re-entering the atmosphere, allowing the final stage to evade missile defense systems that were designed for purely ballistic missiles.

==== National efforts ====
Russia and China lead in hypersonic weapon development, trailed by the United States and other countries.

===== China =====
China's XingKong-2 (星空二号, Starry-sky-2) waverider first flew on 3 August 2018. In August 2021 China launched a boost-glide vehicle to low-earth orbit, circling Earth before maneuvering toward its target location, missing by two dozen miles. However China claimed that the vehicle was a spacecraft, and not a missile.

On July 2021 China tested a spaceplane. An orbital trajectory would take 90 minutes for a spaceplane to circle Earth (which would defeat the mission of a weapon in hypersonic flight). The Pentagon reported in October 2021 that two such hypersonic launches had occurred; one did not demonstrate the accuracy needed for a precision weapon; the second demonstrated its ability to change trajectories.

In 2022, China unveiled two more hypersonic models. An AI simulation reported that a Mach 11 aircraft can outrun a Mach 1.3 fighter attempting to engage it, while firing its missile at the "pursuing" fighter. This strategy entails a fire control system to accomplish an over-the-shoulder missile launch, which did not exist as of 2023.

In February 2023, the DF-27 covered 1,900 km (1,200 mi) in 12 minutes, according to leaked secret documents. The capability directly threatens Guam, and US Navy aircraft carriers.

===== Russia =====
In 2016, Russia is believed to have conducted two successful tests of Avangard, a hypersonic glide vehicle. The third known test, in 2017, failed. In 2018, an Avangard was launched at the Dombarovskiy missile base, reaching its target at the Kura shooting range, a distance of 5,955 km (3,700 mi). Avangard used composite materials to withstand temperatures of up to 2,000 °C (3,630 °F), which it experienced at hypervelocity Russia considered its initial carbon fiber solution to be unreliable, and replaced it with new composite materials. Two Avangard hypersonic glide vehicles (HGVs) were mounted on SS-19 ICBMs. On 27 December 2019 one was fielded to the Yasnensky Missile Division, a unit in the Orenburg Oblast. In 2021 Russia launched a 3M22 Zircon antiship missile (standoff strike weapon) over the White Sea, as part of a series of tests. In February 2022, a coordinated series of missile exercises, some hypersonic, were launched on 18 February 2022 in an apparent display of power projection. The launch platforms ranged from submarines in the Barents Sea, as well as from ships on the Black Sea south of Russia. The exercise included a RS-24 Yars ICBM, which was launched from the Plesetsk Cosmodrome in Northern Russia and reached its destination on the Kamchatka Peninsula in Eastern Russia. Ukraine estimated a 3M22 Zircon was used against it, but it apparently did not exceed Mach 3 and was shot down 7 February 2024 in Kyiv.

===== United States =====
The US launched a joint program across the entire Department of Defense to advance its hypersonic missile development around 2018. Russian and Chinese tests prompted US responses. By 2018, the AGM-183 and Long-Range Hypersonic Weapon were in development. At least one vendor was developing ceramics to handle the temperatures of hypersonic systems. Over a dozen US hypersonic projects were active as of 2018. The bulk of the hypersonics work remains at the Joint level. The Long Range Precision Fires (LRPF) CFT supports Space and Missile Defense Command's pursuit of hypersonics. The Army and Navy's Common Hypersonic Glide Body (C-HGB) successfully tested a prototype in March 2020.

In 2021 a wind tunnel for testing hypersonic vehicles was completed in Texas. The Army's Land-based Hypersonic Missile was intended to have a range of 2,300 km (1,400 mi). By adding rocket propulsion to a shell or glide body, the joint effort shaved five years off the likely fielding time. Hypersonics countermeasures require sensor data fusion: both radar and infrared sensor tracking data are required to capture the signature of a hypersonic vehicle in the atmosphere. Privately developed hypersonic systems were under development. Critics offered opinions.

DoD tested a Common Hypersonic Glide Body (C-HGB) in 2020. The Air Force dropped out of the tri-service hypersonic project in 2020. Air Force chief scientist, Dr. Greg Zacharias stated that the US anticipated having hypersonic weapons by the 2020s, hypersonic drones by the 2030s, and recoverable hypersonic drone aircraft by the 2040s. DoD development focused on air-breathing boost-glide hypersonics systems. Countering hypersonic weapons during their cruise phase requires longer-range radar, as well as space-based sensors, and systems for tracking and fire control.

On 21 October 2021, the Pentagon stated that a test of a hypersonic glide body failed because its booster failed. The test occurred at Pacific Spaceport Complex – Alaska, on Kodiak island. Three rocketsondes at Wallops Island completed successful tests earlier that week. On 29 October 2021, the booster for the Long-Range Hypersonic Weapon (LRHW) passed a static test; the first stage thrust vector control system was included. On 26 October 2022, Sandia National Laboratories successfully tested hypersonic technologies. On 28 June 2024, DoD announced a successful end-to-end test of the US Army's LRHW all-up round (AUR) and the US Navy's Conventional Prompt Strike. The missile was launched from the Pacific Missile Range Facility, Kauai, Hawaii. In September 2021, and in March 2022, Raytheon/Northrop Grumman, and Lockheed respectively, successfully tested their DARPA-funded air-launched, scramjet-powered hypersonic cruise missiles. In September 2022 Raytheon was selected to field their scramjet-powered hypersonic missile Hypersonic Attack Cruise Missile (HACM), by FY2027.

In March 2024, Stratolaunch Roc launched TA-1, a vehicle that approached Mach 5 at 10.67 km (6.63 mi) in a powered flight, a risk-reduction exercise for TA-2. In a similar development, Castelion launched its low-cost hypersonic platform in the Mojave desert in March 2024.

In 2021, DoD was codifying flight test guidelines, knowledge gained from Conventional Prompt Strike (CPS), and other hypersonics programs, for some 70 hypersonics R&D programs. In 2021–2023, Heidi Shyu, the Under Secretary of Defense for Research and Engineering pursued a program of annual rapid joint experiments, including hypersonics capabilities, to bring down the cost of development. Hypersonic test beds were targeting test frequency of one per week.

===== Iran =====
In 2022, Iran was believed to have constructed a hypersonic missile. Amir Ali Hajizadeh, the commander of the Air Force of the Islamic Republic of Iran's Revolutionary Guards Corps, announced the construction of their first hypersonic missile. with a speed above Mach 13.

===== Other programs =====
France, Australia, India, Germany, Japan, South Korea, and North Korea, have hypersonic weapon projects/research programs.

As of 2025, Australia and the US jointly develop air-launched hypersonic missiles. The development was to build on the $54 million Hypersonic International Flight Research Experimentation (HIFiRE) under which both nations collaborated on over a 15-year period. Companies were expected to contribute to the development of these missiles, named SCIFIRE in 2022.

== Defenses ==
In May 2023 Ukraine shot down a Kinzhal with a Patriot missile. IBCS, or the Integrated Air and Missile Defense Battle Command System is designed to work with Patriots and other missiles.

=== Rand 2017 assessment ===
In 2017 Rand Corporation estimated that in less than a decade, hypersonic missiles would proliferate. In the same way that anti-ballistic missiles were developed as countermeasures to ballistic missiles, countermeasures to Hypersonics were not in development as of 2019. $157.4 million was allocated in the FY2020 Pentagon budget for hypersonic defense, out of $2.6 billion for all hypersonic-related research. $207 million of the FY2021 budget was allocated to defensive hypersonics. Both the US and Russia withdrew from the Intermediate-Range Nuclear Forces (INF) Treaty in February 2019. By 2021 the Missile Defense Agency was funding regional countermeasures against hypersonic weapons in their glide phase. The United States Center for Strategic and International Studies assessed that hypersonic defense should take priority in that country over hypersonic weapons. (Note: In the CSIS report and discussion of Hypersonic missile defense, one of the panelists, Kelley M. Sayler (Congressional Research Service) summarized the situation (as of 7 February 2022) and quoted Michael Griffin's assessment that Hypersonic cruise missiles are 10 to 20 times dimmer than ballistic missiles.)

=== NDSA / PWSA ===
As part of their hypersonic vehicle tracking mission, the Space Development Agency (SDA) launched four satellites and the Missile Defense Agency (MDA) launched two satellites in 2024. The satellites shared the same orbit, which allowed the SDA's wide field of view (WFOV) satellites and the MDA's medium field of view (MFOV) downward-looking satellites to traverse the same terrain. The SDA's four satellites are part of its Tranche 0 tracking layer (T0TL). The MDA's two satellites are HBTSS or Hypersonic and ballistic tracking space sensors. (Note: Space development agency (SDA) provides the PWSA wide field of view (WFOV) sensors; Missile defense agency (MDA) provides the Hypersonic and Ballistic Tracking Space Sensor (HBTSS) sensors, (i.e., the Medium Field of View (MFOV) sensors). The WFOV sensors provide cueing data to the MFOV sensors, which are more sensitive and provide tipping data to the earth-based interceptors. as cited in USNI News. Two WFOV satellites were launched as part of the inititial Tranche 0.)

Additional capabilities of Tranche 0 of the National defense space architecture (NDSA), also known as the Proliferated warfighting space architecture (PWSA) will be tested.

== Proposed ==
=== Aircraft ===
Artist depiction of the Halcyon commercial hypersonic transport aircraft proposed by the Hermeus corporation in flight.

- (China) I-Plane
- (Brazil) 14-X
- (France) Espadon hypersonic combat aircraft concept (program conducted by the ONERA)
- (India) Avatar (spacecraft)
- (India) Advanced Technology Vehicle
- (United States) DARPA XS-1
- (Switzerland) Destinus hydrogen-powered hypersonic aircraft. A prototype was tested last year.
- (United States) Dream Chaser
- (United States) NASA X-43
- (United States) HyperSoar
- (Germany) HyperStar hypersonic passenger airliner
- (United States) Falcon HTV-2
- (United States) Boeing Commercial Airplanes hypersonic airliner Concept
- (United States) Lockheed Martin SR-72
- (Russia) Kholod
- (Russia) Ayaks waverider spaceplane
- Programme for Reusable In-orbit Demonstrator in Europe (PRIDE)
- (Germany) Sänger II
- (Australia) HyShot
- (Germany) Hytex
- (Germany) Horus
- (Germany) SHEFEX
- (United Kingdom) Skylon
- (United Kingdom) Reaction Engines A2
- (United Kingdom) Hypersonic Air Vehicle Experimental (HVX) with Concept V aircraft
- (Australia) Spartan
- (European Union) HEXAFLY
- (Germany) SpaceLiner
- (European Union) STRATOFLY
- (Japan) Zero Emission Hyper Sonic Transport
- (United States) Hermeus Quarterhourse unmanned hypersonic demonstrator designed to land and take-off on conventional runways.
- (United States) Hermeus Halcyon hypersonic transport
- (United States) Venus Aerospace Stargazer hypersonic airliner with rotating detonation rocket engine
- (Germany) POLARIS Raumflugzeuge GmbH is developing and testing a hypersonic spaceplane for the German Armed Forces

=== Bombers ===
- (United States) Expendable Hypersonic Air-Breathing Multi-Mission Demonstrator ("Mayhem") Based on § HAWC and HSSW: "solid rocket-boosted, air-breathing, hypersonic conventional cruise missile", a follow-on to AGM-183A. As of 2020 no design work had been done. By 2022 Mayhem was to be tasked with ISR and strike missions, as a possible bomber. Leidos is preparing a system requirements review, and a conceptual design for these missions. Draper Labs has begun a partnership with Leidos. Kratos is preparing a conceptual design for Mayhem, using Air Force Research Laboratory (AFRL) digital engineering techniques in a System design agent team, a collaboration with Leidos, Calspan, and Draper. DIU is soliciting additional Hypersonic and High-Cadence Airborne Testing Capabilities (HyCAT), for Mayhem.

=== Cruise missiles ===
- (United States) Advanced Hypersonic Weapon (AHW)
- (United States) Hypersonic Air-breathing Weapon Concept (HAWC, pronounced "hawk"). September 2021: HAWC is DARPA-funded. Built by Raytheon and Northrop Grumman, HAWC is the first US scramjet-powered hypersonic missile to complete a free flight test in the 2020s. DARPA's goals for the test, which were successfully met, were: "vehicle integration and release sequence, safe separation from the launch aircraft, booster ignition and boost, booster separation and engine ignition, and cruise". HAWC is capable of sustained, powered maneuver in the atmosphere. HAWC appears to depend on a rocket booster to accelerate to scramjet velocities operating in an oxygen-rich environment. It is easier to put a seeker on a sub-sonic air-breathing vehicle. In March 2022 a HAWC Scramjet was successfully tested in an air-launched flight. On 18 July 2022 Raytheon announced another successful test of its Hypersonic Air-breathing Weapon Concept (HAWC) scramjet, in free flight. MoHAWC is a follow-on to DARPA's HAWC project.
- (United States) Hypersonic Conventional Strike Weapon (HCSW - pronounced "hacksaw") passed its critical design review (CDR) but this IDIQ (indefinite duration, indefinite quantity) contract was terminated in favor of ARRW because twice as many ARRWs fit on a bomber.
- ASN4G (air-launched, scramjet-powered, hypersonic cruise missile under development by MBDA France and the ONERA to succeed the ASMP)
- (Soviet Union) Kh-45 (cancelled)
- (Russia) Zircon
- (India) Hypersonic Technology Demonstrator Vehicle
- (India) / (Russia) Brahmos-II
- (South Korea) Hycore

=== Glide vehicles ===
- (United States) AGM-183A air launched rapid response weapon (ARRW, pronounced "arrow") Telemetry data was successfully transmitted from ARRW —AGM-183A IMV-2 (Instrumented Measurement Vehicle) to Point Mugu ground stations, demonstrating the ability to accurately broadcast radio at hypersonic speeds; however, ARRW's launch sequence was not completed. Hundreds of ARRWs or other Hypersonic weapons are sought by the Air Force. On 9 March 2022 Congress halved funding for ARRW and transferred the balance to ARRW's R&D account to allow for further testing, which puts the procurement contract at risk. Production decision on ARRW was delayed for a year to complete flight testing. On 14 May 2022 an ARRW flight test was completed for the first time, followed by two others. The Air Force required 3 additional successful tests of an All-Up Round (AUR) before making a production decision. The USAF intended to end the ARRW development program, as of 29 March 2023. A B-52 flying out of Anderson AFB in Guam fired an ARRW; the AUR was tested in the Pacific on 17 March 2024. No production decision was made in 2024.
- (United States) DARPA Tactical Boost Glide vehicle

- (France) VMaX-2 hypersonic glide vehicle (under development by ArianeGroup; first flight test scheduled for 2025)
- (India) HGV-202F

== Flown ==
=== Aircraft ===
- (United States) North American X-15 (crewed)
- (United States) Lockheed X-17
- (United States) NASA X-43
- (United States) Boeing X-51
- (India) HSTDV

=== Glide vehicles ===
- (Russia) Avangard
- (China) DF-ZF
- (North Korea) Hwasong-8
- (North Korea) Hwasong-12A (official designation unconfirmed)
- (North Korea) Hwasong-16B
- (Iran) Unnamed
- (France) VMaX (developed by ArianeGroup; first flight test took place on 26 June 2023 and was a success)

=== Spaceplanes ===
- (United States) Space Shuttle orbiter (crewed)
- (Soviet Union) Buran (human-rated, only flew without crew)
- (India) RLV-TD
- (United States) Boeing X-37
- (China) Shenlong
- IXV
- (Soviet Union) BOR-4
- (United States) Martin X-23 PRIME
- (United States) ASSET
- (Japan) HYFLEX
- (China) Reusable experimental spacecraft (disputed)
- (China) Jiageng-1

== Cancelled ==
=== Aircraft ===
- (Nazi Germany) Silbervogel (Sänger bomber)
- (Soviet Union) Keldysh bomber
- (Soviet Union) Tupolev Tu-360, follow-on to Tu-160
- (Soviet Union) Tupolev Tu-2000
- (United States) Lockheed L-301

=== Glide vehicles ===
- (France) VERAS (hypersonic glide vehicle program launched in 1965 and cancelled in 1971)

=== Spaceplanes ===
- (United States) Boeing X-20 Dyna-Soar
- (United States) Rockwell X-30 (National Aerospace Plane)
- (United States) Orbital Sciences X-34
- (Soviet Union) Mikoyan-Gurevich MiG-105
- (United States) Tsien Spaceplane 1949
- (Japan) HOPE-X
- (United States) XCOR Lynx
- (United States) Lockheed Martin X-33
- (France) Hermes
- (United States) Prometheus
- (United States) HL-20 Personnel Launch System
- (United States) HL-42
- (United Kingdom) BAC Mustard
- (Russia) Kliper
- (United Kingdom) HOTOL
- (Weimar Republic) Valier Raketenschiff
- (United States) Rockwell C-1057

== See also ==
- Hypersonic effect
- Supersonic transport
- Lifting body
- List of X-planes
- Thunderbird 1
