= X-41 Common Aero Vehicle =

US military spaceplane

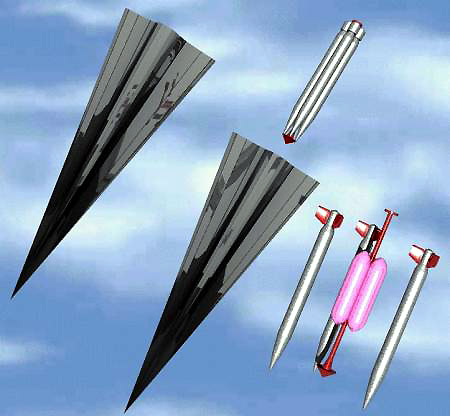
- Early CAV concept 1997-98

General information
- Type: Experimental maneuvering re-entry vehicle
- National origin: United States
- Status: Experimental research program
- Primary user: DARPA

X-41 is the designation, initiated in 2003, for a still-classified United States military spaceplane. The X-41 is now part of the FALCON (Force Application and Launch from Continental United States) program sponsored by DARPA and NASA.

== Description ==
Specifications or photos of the X-41 program have not been released to the public; thus little is known about its goals. It has been described as an experimental maneuvering reentry vehicle capable of transporting a 1,000-pound payload on a sub-orbital trajectory at hypersonic speeds and releasing that payload into the atmosphere. The word "Aero" in "Common Aero Vehicle" stood for "aeroshell", not "aerospace", because the CAV was a common aerothermodynamic shell for varying and multiple payloads. The technology necessary for the X-41 is not known and reportedly has yet to be developed. However, it is believed to be a new form of hypersonic propulsion capable of exceeding Mach 7, perhaps reaching Mach 9 (11,000 km/h; 6,900 mph).

== See also ==
- Hypersonic Technology Vehicle 2
- Prompt Global Strike
