= HTV-2 =

HTV-2 may refer to:

- Kounotori 2, the second H-II Transfer Vehicle
- Hypersonic Technology Vehicle 2, part of the DARPA Falcon Project
- HTV2, entertainment private channels in Ho Chi Minh City Television
