= Conventional Prompt Strike =

US defense project

Conventional Prompt Strike (CPS), formerly called Prompt Global Strike (PGS), is a United States military effort to develop a system that can deliver a precision-guided conventional weapon strike anywhere in the world within one hour, in a similar manner to a nuclear ICBM. Such a weapon would allow the United States to respond far more swiftly to rapidly emerging threats than is possible with conventional forces. A CPS system could also be useful during a nuclear conflict, potentially replacing the use of nuclear weapons against up to 30% of targets. The CPS program encompasses numerous established and emerging technologies, including conventional surface-launched missiles and air- and submarine-launched hypersonic missiles.

== System ==
The CPS system is intended to complement existing American rapid-response forces, such as Forward Deployed Forces, Air Expeditionary Groups (which can deploy within 48 hours) and carrier battle groups (which can respond within 96 hours). Possible delivery systems for CPS warheads include:

- a rocket similar to existing ICBMs, launched from land or via submarine
- an air- or submarine-launched hypersonic cruise missile, such as a massive version of Boeing X-51 or Advanced Hypersonic Weapon
- a kinetic weapon launched from an orbiting space platform

In 2010, the United States Air Force prototyped a CPS system based on a modified Minuteman III ICBM. In March 2011, Air Force Major General David Scott stated that the service had no plans to use a sea- or land-based ICBM system for Prompt Global Strike, as they would be expensive to develop and potentially "dangerous". Instead, efforts would focus on a hypersonic glider. However, the following day, Chief of Staff of the United States Air Force Norton Schwartz said that an ICBM-based CPS system was still an option.

== Development history ==
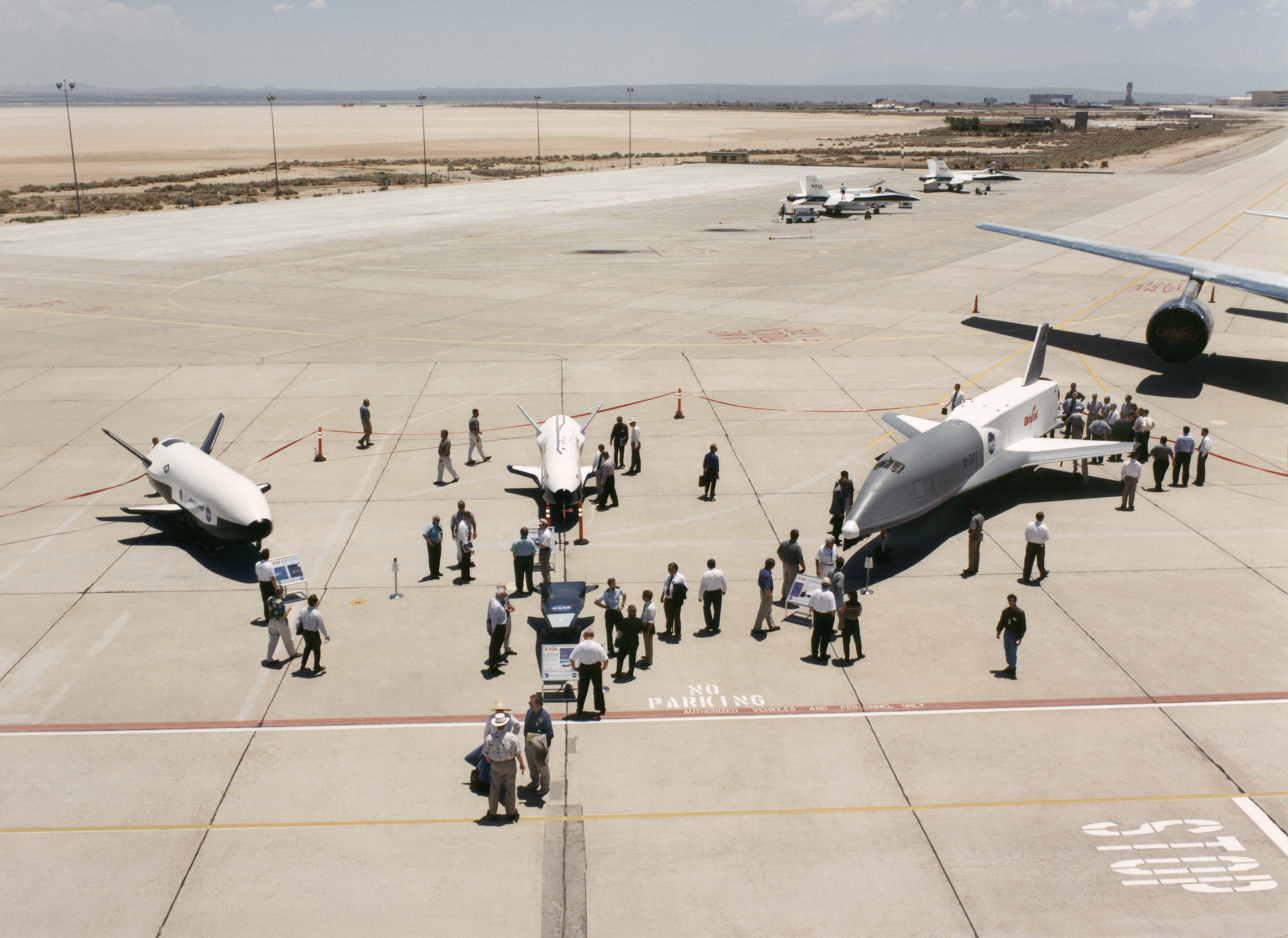
The Orbital Test Vehicles (OTV-1 and OTV-2) are on the left, and the X-34 is on the right. Mission: "demonstrate a reliable, reusable, unmanned space test platform for the United States Air Force." Possible applications: to serve as part of a reconnaissance program, a space bomber, or even a military satellite delivery system.

=== Background ===
The George W. Bush administration considered developing a hypersonic conventional weapon for a CPS role in the 2000s, in the form of DARPA's Falcon Project. A conventionally-armed modification of the Trident SLBM was also proposed as a CPS candidate in 2006. The Bush administration ultimately rejected the idea of a CPS system because of fears that a submarine-launched ballistic missile would trigger the Russian nuclear-launch warning system, potentially provoking a nuclear war. However, the Obama administration continued development of the system later in the decade. In April 2010, Marine Corps General James Cartwright explained the system's rationale, stating that "Today, unless you want to go nuclear, [the conventional military response time is] measured in days, maybe weeks".

A potential enemy cannot be certain that a launched ICBM contains only a conventional warhead, not a nuclear one. It is thus currently unclear what design features or precautions could convince China and Russia, two countries with advanced launch-detection systems and nuclear ICBMs, to ignore their early-warning systems. Current ideas include a low-trajectory missile design, or allowing Russian and Chinese inspection of CPS missile sites.

On 11 April 2010, United States secretary of defense Robert Gates indicated that the United States already had a Prompt Global Strike capability. This coincided with the New START disarmament treaty signed on 8 April 2010, which set new, lower limits on arsenals of ballistic missiles and their warheads. The treaty does not distinguish between conventional and nuclear versions of weapons, meaning any ballistic CPS missiles and warheads would count toward the new limit. However, the U.S. State Department stated in 2010 that this would not constrain plans for CPS deployment, since plans for the system at that time did not come near the New START limits.

In 2024, Zumwalt-class destroyers were reported to be undergoing refits to carry hypersonic CPS.

=== Advanced hypersonic weapon ===
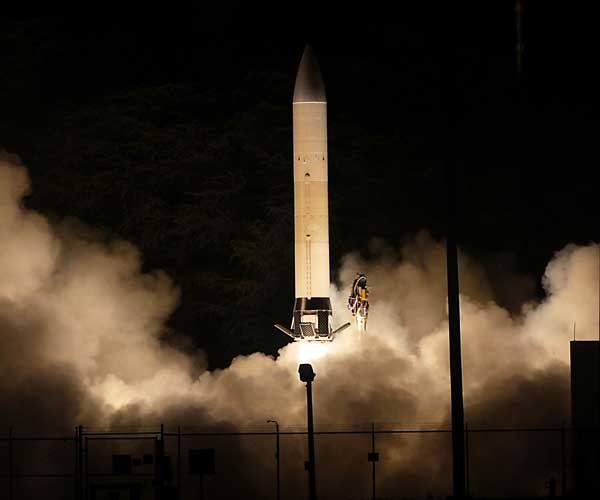
The Advanced Hypersonic Weapon (AHW) performs its first flight in 2011 on a STARS missile from the Pacific Missile Range Facility at Kauai in Hawaii

On 18 November 2011, the first advanced hypersonic weapon (AHW) glide vehicle was successfully tested by the U.S. Army Space and Missile Defense Command as part of the Prompt Global Strike program. The missile was launched from the Pacific Missile Range Facility in Hawaii, and struck a target at the Reagan Test Site on Kwajalein Atoll, over 3,700 kilometres (2,300 mi) away, in under 30 minutes. The prototype, which incorporated technologies developed by Sandia National Laboratories, was used to gather data to assist the development of future hypersonic warheads. The AHW followed an endo-atmospheric (within earth atmosphere, at altitude below 100 kilometers) non-ballistic trajectory during the test flight. This is a crucial design feature, as following a depressed trajectory that is much lower and flatter than a normal ICBM prevents other nuclear-armed nations from mistakenly thinking the AHW is a nuclear-tipped missile.

The second AHW test flight occurred on 25 August 2014 from the Kodiak Launch Complex in Alaska. The mission was terminated shortly after liftoff due to an anomaly in the launch vehicle. Operators triggered a self-destruct sequence four seconds after launching, with eyewitnesses claiming the weapon had veered off trajectory just as it took off. A Failure Review Board released the results of their investigation into the failed launch in early February 2015. The board determined that an external thermal protective cover, designed to regulate motor temperature, interfered with the launch vehicle's steering assembly; no issues were found with the hypersonic glide body, booster motors, or the Kodiak Launch Complex, and the board determined the test range flight safety officer correctly followed established protocol and procedures.

=== HTV-2 ===
The HTV-2 Falcon, a project to develop an experimental hypersonic glide vehicle, staged a pair of test flights.

=== Submarine option ===
In January 2012, the Pentagon stated that the CPS launch platform would be submarine-based. However, practical efforts to develop the CPS system were delayed by fears of accidentally starting a nuclear conflict. In February 2014, the U.S. Navy solicited proposals for two-year industry trade studies to test the feasibility of developing a hypersonic submarine-launched intermediate-range conventional CPS weapon. The Navy specified that the effort was a study to evaluate technology options, not to develop a system-level specific CPS solution. The Navy stated that it would be interested in awarding one or two 13-month technology evaluation contracts, each worth around US$5 million.

=== Conventional Prompt Strike ===
The Conventional Prompt Strike successfully tested a rocket motor for ship and submarine-launched cells in June 2021. The Army/Navy Common-Hypersonic Glide Body was successfully tested in 2020. The U.S. Navy awarded Lockheed Martin a contract to integrate the Conventional Prompt Strike weapon system onto the Zumwalt-class destroyers in February 2023.

== Foreign responses ==
=== People's Republic of China ===
According to Taylor Fravel, China has expanded its nuclear arsenal in response to fears of U.S. conventional prompt strike capabilities. The People's Liberation Army (PLA) began developing a long-range hypersonic missile, the DF-ZF rocket-boosted hypersonic glide vehicle, in the 2010s. Seven flight tests — with one failure — were conducted from January 2014 through 2016. It likely entered service by October 2019.

=== Russia ===
In December 2010, Russian military experts indicated that the forthcoming S-500 missile defense system would include anti-hypersonic defenses. In December 2012, commenting on the development of a replacement for its R-36M2 Voevoda ICBM, the commander of the Russian Strategic Missile Forces, Sergey Karakaev, stated that the missile would allow Russia "to realize such opportunities as the creation of high precision strategic weapons with non-nuclear warheads and a practical global range. Russia can create non-nuclear, high precision weapons based on intercontinental rockets in the event that the USA also works on designing such a weapon". On 11 December 2013, Vice Prime Minister Dmitry Rogozin warned that Russia would use nuclear weapons if it came under an attack, adding that this possibility serves as the main deterrent to potential aggressors. Rogozin also stated that the Russian Foundation for Advanced Research Projects in the Defense Industry (FPI) would develop a military response to the CPS system.

In September 2014, Russia's president Vladimir Putin mentioned CPS among a number of the new threats Russia faced, along with the US Ground-Based Midcourse Defense system in Alaska, the Aegis Ballistic Missile Defense System in Europe, and increased NATO activity in eastern Europe. Deputy prime minister Dmitry Rogozin again warned that Russia would upgrade its strategic nuclear forces and aerospace defences in response to the CPS system.

Jane's Intelligence Review reported in 2015 that the Russian Yu-71 hypersonic boost-glide system had been undergoing test flights since 2011, though its predecessors date back to 2001.

In October 2015, while attending a non-proliferation conference in New York, the Russian Foreign Ministry's Department of Non-proliferation, Disarmament, and Arms Control Mikhail Ivanovich Ulyanov stated "[It] is the US policy that hinders further nuclear reductions [including through] gradual advancement towards implementing the “prompt global strike” concept"

In March 2018, the Avangard hypersonic weapon system, a development of the Yu-71/Yu-74, entered series production.

== See also ==
- Air Force Global Strike Command
- Anti-ship ballistic missile
- Avangard (Russia)
- ArcLight, a DARPA program which proposed using US Navy ships such as Aegis cruisers to launch intercontinental missiles
- Non-ballistic atmospheric entry
- DF-21D, a conventionally armed MRBM deployed by China in an anti-ship capacity
- DF-ZF, China
- Kinetic bombardment
- Long-Range Hypersonic Weapon
- Tupolev Tu-360
- Rocket Cargo, delivery of cargo in 1 hour anywhere in the world by US military
