= Planar reentry equations =

The planar reentry equations are the equations of motion governing the unpowered reentry of a spacecraft, based on the assumptions of planar motion and constant mass, in an Earth-fixed reference frame.

== Definition ==
The equations are given by:

$$\begin{cases} \frac{dV}{dt} &= -\frac{\rho V^{2}}{2\beta} + g \sin \gamma \\ \frac{d\gamma}{dt} &= -\frac{V \cos\gamma}{r} - \frac{\rho V}{2\beta} \left( \frac{L}{D} \right) \cos \sigma + \frac{g \cos \gamma}{V} \\ \frac{dh}{dt} &= -V\sin \gamma \end{cases}$$

where the quantities in these equations are:

- $V$ is the velocity
- $\gamma > 0$ is the flight path angle
- $h$ is the altitude
- $\rho$ is the atmospheric density
- $\beta$ is the ballistic coefficient
- $g$ is the gravitational acceleration
- $r = r_{e} + h$ is the radius from the center of a planet with equatorial radius $r_{e}$
- $L/D$ is the lift-to-drag ratio
- $\sigma$ is the bank angle of the spacecraft.

== Simplifications ==
=== Allen-Eggers solution ===
Harry Allen and Alfred Eggers, based on their studies of ICBM trajectories, were able to derive an analytical expression for the velocity as a function of altitude. They made several assumptions:

1. The spacecraft's entry was purely ballistic $(L = 0)$.
2. The effect of gravity is small compared to drag, and can be ignored.
3. The flight path angle and ballistic coefficient are constant.
4. An exponential atmosphere, where $\rho(h) = \rho_{0}\exp(-h/H)$, with $\rho_{0}$ being the density at the planet's surface and $H$ being the scale height.

These assumptions are valid for hypersonic speeds, where the Mach number is greater than 5. Then the planar reentry equations for the spacecraft are:

$$\begin{cases} \frac{dV}{dt} &= -\frac{\rho_{0}}{2\beta}V^{2}e^{-h/H} \\\frac{dh}{dt} &= -V \sin \gamma \end{cases} \implies \frac{dV}{dh} = \frac{\rho_{0}}{2\beta\sin\gamma}Ve^{-h/H}$$

Rearranging terms and integrating from the atmospheric interface conditions at the start of reentry $(V_{\text{atm}},h_{\text{atm}})$ leads to the expression:

$$\frac{dV}{V} = \frac{\rho_{0}}{2\beta\sin \gamma}e^{-h/H}dh \implies \log \left( \frac{V}{V_{\text{atm}}} \right) = -\frac{\rho_{0}H}{2\beta \sin\gamma} \left( e^{-h/H} - e^{-h_{\text{atm}}/H} \right)$$

The term $\exp(-h_{\text{atm}}/H)$ is small and may be neglected, leading to the velocity:

$$V(h) = V_{\text{atm}} \exp \left(  -\frac{\rho_{0}H}{2\beta \sin\gamma} e^{-h/H} \right)$$

Allen and Eggers were also able to calculate the deceleration along the trajectory, in terms of the number of g's experienced $n = g_{0}^{-1} (dV/dt)$, where $g_{0}$ is the gravitational acceleration at the planet's surface. The altitude and velocity at maximum deceleration are:

$$h_{n_\max} = H\log\left( -\frac{\rho_{0}H}{\beta \sin \gamma} \right), \quad V_{n_\max} = V_{\text{atm}}e^{-1/2} \implies n_{\max} = -\frac{V_{\text{atm}}^{2} \sin \gamma}{2g_{0} e H}$$

It is also possible to compute the maximum stagnation point convective heating with the Allen-Eggers solution and a heat transfer correlation; the Sutton-Graves correlation is commonly chosen. The heat rate $\dot{q}''$ at the stagnation point, with units of Watts per square meter, is assumed to have the form:

$$\dot{q}'' = k\left( \frac{\rho}{r_{n}} \right)^{1/2}V^{3} \sim \text{W}/\text{m}^{2}$$

where $r_{n}$ is the effective nose radius. The constant $k = 1.74153 \times 10^{-4}$ for Earth. Then the altitude and value of peak convective heating may be found:

$$h_{\dot{q}_{\max}''} = H \log \left( -\frac{\beta \sin \gamma}{3H\rho_{0} } \right) \implies \dot{q}_{\max}'' = k \sqrt{ -\frac{\beta \sin\gamma}{3Hr_{n}e} }V_{\text{atm}}^{3}$$

=== Equilibrium glide condition ===
Another commonly encountered simplification is a lifting entry with a shallow, slowly-varying, flight path angle. The velocity as a function of altitude can be derived from two assumptions:

1. The flight path angle is shallow, meaning that: $\cos\gamma \approx 1, \sin\gamma\approx \gamma$.
2. The flight path angle changes very slowly, such that $d\gamma/dt \approx 0$.

From these two assumptions, we may infer from the second equation of motion that:

$\left[\frac{1}{r} + \frac{\rho }{2\beta} \left( \frac{L}{D} \right) \cos \sigma \right]V^{2} = g \implies V(h) = \sqrt{ \frac{g r}{1 + \frac{\rho r}{2\beta} \left( \frac{L}{D} \right) \cos \sigma} }$

=== Unified Analytical Survival Index for Ballistic Re-entry ===
Classical mechanics frameworks for calculating entry heating, such as the Allen-Eggers model, frequently rely on simplified isothermal atmospheric conditions and assumptions to evaluate trajectory deceleration and aerodynamic heating. While these simplified models provide useful early approximations for stagnation point heat transfer, real atmospheres and planetary entry involves complex hypersonic gas dynamics and substantial temperature and density gradients.

In order to bridge the gap between simplified models and real-world atmospheres, a survival index was developed, known as the Unified Analytical Survival Index for Ballistic Re-entry, which uses polytropic and non-isothermal atmospheres. This survival index is a closed-form analytical frameworks used to evaluate whether objects will undergo complete thermal ablation, or whether they will maintain enough structural integrity to survive until ground impact.

==== Limitations ====
This analytical model for ballistic re-entry has various limitations and assumptions:

1. Assumes a zero-lift trajectory (${L/D}=0$) and constant ballistic coefficient (${\partial \beta \over \partial t}=0$) which restricts the framework to non-lifting, non-ablating vehicles
2. Uses a flat-Earth approximation ($g(z)\thickapprox g_0$)
3. Uses a static polytrophic gas assumption ($P\varpropto \rho^{1+\frac{1}{n}}$
4. Focuses only on stagnation-point heating ($q \varpropto \sqrt\frac{\rho}{R}\times v^3$) which limits its applicability to steep and short-duration trajectories.

==== Proof ====
The proof beings by modelling the atmosphere with a non-isothermal polytropic density profile. For a constant lapse rate $L$, the hydrostatic and ideal gas relations give the density as a function of the normalised pressure co-ordinate $u$:

$\rho(h)=\rho_0\left(1-\frac{Lh}{T_0}\right)^{g/(RL)-1} \quad\Longrightarrow\quad \rho(u)=\rho_0\,u^{2\delta}, \qquad \delta \equiv \frac12\left(1-\frac{RL}{g}\right)>0$

where $u(h)=\left(1-\frac{Lh}{T_0}\right)^{g/(RL)}$ is defined as the dimensionless pressure variable.

Substituting this density into the ballistic deceleration equation $\frac{d(\ln V)}{dh}=\frac{\rho(h)}{2\beta\sin\gamma}$ and changing variables from altitude $h$ to $u$ (using $dh=-\frac{RT_0}{g}u^{RL/g-1}\,du$) yields:

$d(\ln V)=-\frac{\rho_0 R T_0}{2\beta g\sin\gamma}\, u^{\,2\delta+RL/g-1}\,du$

The key algebraic cancellation $2\delta+\frac{RL}{g}-1 = \left(1-\frac{RL}{g}\right)+\frac{RL}{g}-1=0$ makes the integrand constant in $u$. Hence the closed-form velocity solution is:

$V(u)=V_E\,\exp\bigl[\Lambda(u_E-u)\bigr], \qquad \Lambda \equiv \frac{\rho_0 R T_0}{2\beta g\sin\gamma},$ where $V_E$ and $u_E$ are the entry values.

This velocity profile is then fed into the Fay-Riddell stagnation-point convective heating correlation$\dot q(u)=C\sqrt{\rho(u)}\,V(u)^3, \qquad C=\frac{k_{\mathrm{FR}}}{\sqrt{R_n}},$ giving the heat flux profile along the trajectory:

$\dot q(u)=C\sqrt{\rho_0}\,V_E^3\, u^{\delta}\exp\bigl[3\Lambda(u_E-u)\bigr]$

The peak heat flux $\dot q_p$ is obtained by setting $d\dot q/du=0$. For the in-trajectory regime ($\delta u_E \le x \le \delta$, where $x\equiv 3\Lambda u_E$), the peak occurs at $u_*=\delta/(3\Lambda)=\delta u_E/x$ and the peak value is $\dot q_p = C\sqrt{\rho_0}\,V_E^3\, \delta^{\delta}u_E^{\delta}\,x^{-\delta}e^{x-\delta}.$

By defining the dimensionless Thermal Protection System capacity as $Q \equiv \frac{\dot q_{\mathrm{lim}}\,e^{\delta}} {C\sqrt{\rho_0}\,V_E^3\,\delta^{\delta}u_E^{\delta}},$ the survival condition $\dot q_p \le \dot q_{\mathrm{lim}}$ becomes $x^{-\delta}e^{x} \le Q \quad\Longleftrightarrow\quad x^{\delta}e^{-x} \ge Q^{-1}.$

This inequality is solved exactly using the Lambert $W$ function. Setting $y=x/\delta$ and $K=Q^{-1/\delta}/\delta$, the solution is $y e^{-y}=K \quad\Longrightarrow\quad (-y)e^{-y}=-K \quad\Longrightarrow\quad y=-W(-K),$ so the bounds of feasibility are $x_{\min}=-\delta\,W_0\!\left(-K\right),\qquad x_{\max}=-\delta\,W_{-1}\!\left(-K\right),$ where $W_0$ and $W_1$ are the 2 real branches of the Lambert $W$ function.

The Unified Analytical Survival Index for Ballistic Re-entry is defined as:

$\Psi \equiv \frac{\dot q_{\mathrm{lim}}}{\dot q_p}.$

Thermal survival requires $\Psi \ge 1$. In the in-trajectory regime, $\Psi(x)=Q\,x^{\delta}e^{-x},\qquad x\in[\delta u_E,\delta],$ with a unique maximum at $x=\delta$:

$\Psi_{\max}=Q\,\delta^{\delta}e^{-\delta} = \frac{\dot q_{\mathrm{lim}}} {C\sqrt{\rho_0}\,V_E^3\,u_E^{\delta}}.$

Hence the proof establishes a direct, closed-form relationship between the atmospheric parameters $\rho_0, T_0, L$, the vehicle properties $\beta, R_n, \dot q_{\mathrm{lim}}$ and the entry conditions $V_E, \gamma$, leading to a single dimensionless index $\Psi$ that can immediately predict whether the vehicle would survive the re-entry heating phase or not.

== See also ==
- Atmospheric entry
- Hypersonic flight
