= Lockheed Martin SR-72 =

US Air Force hypersonic aircraft concept

SR-72
- 2013 Lockheed Martin concept image of the SR-72

General information
- Type: Hypersonic strategic reconnaissance aircraft
- Manufacturer: Lockheed Martin
- Status: Design proposal

The Lockheed Martin SR-72, commonly referred to as "Son of Blackbird", is an American hypersonic concept intended for intelligence, surveillance, and reconnaissance (ISR). It was proposed privately in 2013 by Lockheed Martin as a successor to the retired Lockheed SR-71 Blackbird. As of 2025, no confirmed flight tests have occurred, although some speculate that the SR‑72 could enter service in the 2030s.

== Background ==
The SR-71 Blackbird, which flew Mach 3 at 80,000 feet, was retired by the United States Air Force in 1998, eliminating a valuable intelligence, surveillance, and reconnaissance (ISR) asset. Although most fifth-generation jet fighters and planned drones intended for enemy airspace rely on anti-radar stealth technologies, Professor Justin Bronk, a senior research fellow in airpower and technology at the Royal United Services Institute (RUSI), argues that the rise of anti-access/area denial tactics and counter-stealth technologies renders speed more promising than stealth for penetrating protected airspace.

The first unconfirmed reports about the SR-72 emerged in 2007, when various sources reported that Lockheed Martin's Advanced Development Programs (ADP) division, Skunk Works, was developing an aircraft capable of flying at six times the speed of sound, or Mach 6 (4,000 mph; 6,400 km/h; 3,500 kn), for the United States Air Force—about twice as fast as the SR-71.

== Design and development ==
=== Early work ===
Since 2006, Lockheed Martin had been working to develop a suitable engine with Aerojet Rocketdyne. After the HTV-3X (DARPA FALCON Project) was cancelled in 2008, Aerojet Rocketdyne applied its scramjet (supersonic combustion ramjet) technology to the SR-72's engine design. The SR-72 was envisioned to have an air-breathing propulsion system that could operate at subsonic, transonic, supersonic, and hypersonic speeds. Turbojet engines can function from zero speed and typically perform best up to Mach 2.2. Ramjets, which rely on aerodynamic compression with subsonic combustion, perform poorly below Mach 0.5, are most efficient around Mach 3, and can operate up to about Mach 6. (Note: The SR-71's engines shifted to low-speed ramjets by redirecting airflow around the core and into the afterburner at speeds exceeding Mach 2.5.) Scramjets can cover the high-supersonic-to-hypersonic range. The SR-72 was to employ a turbine-based combined cycle (TBCC) system, with a turbine engine for low speeds and a scramjet for high speeds. The engines would share an inlet and nozzle but have separate airflow paths.

At speeds of Mach 5 and above, aerodynamic heating generates temperatures sufficient to melt conventional metallic airframes, prompting engineers to consider making critical components from composites such as the high-performance carbon, ceramic, and metal mixes used in intercontinental ballistic missiles (ICBMs) and the retired Space Shuttle.

=== Plans for a prototype ===
On November 1, 2013, Aviation Week & Space Technology published an article on the SR-72's development.Public interest in the news was so intense that it overwhelmed the magazine's servers. Lockheed Martin officials announced plans to build an optionally piloted scaled demonstrator, about 60 feet (18 m) long—comparable in size to a Lockheed Martin F-22 Raptor—powered by a single full-scale engine to achieve Mach 6 for several minutes. They projected it would be ready by 2018 for flight testing aligned with the High Speed Strike Weapon timeline. The production version of the SR-72, company officials said, would resemble the SR-71 in size at over 100 ft (30 m) long, share its range, and enter service by 2030. It was intended to follow the US Air Force's hypersonic roadmap, targeting a hypersonic strike weapon by 2020 and a penetrating ISR aircraft by 2030. Lockheed officials noted they had discussed the project with government officials but had not secured funding for the prototype or engine.

=== Air Force's thoughts ===
On November 13, 2013, Air Force Chief of Staff General Mark Welsh said the Air Force was interested in the ability of a hypersonic aircraft to reduce the time an adversary would have to react, citing it among ways to counter advanced air defenses. Welsh acknowledged the service was pursuing hypersonic technology but lacked the materials to build a full-sized aircraft like the SR-72. He also clarified that the Air Force had not engaged with Lockheed Martin regarding the SR-72.

By December 2013, the Air Force declined to fund the SR-72 program. Facing budget constraints, the service chose instead to develop the Northrop Grumman RQ-180 stealth UAV—anticipated to be less costly and complex to design and produce—for ISR missions in contested airspace.

== Timeline ==
=== 2014 NASA contracts ===
In December 2014, NASA awarded Lockheed Martin a contract to study the feasibility of developing the SR-72's propulsion system using existing turbine-engine technologies. The $892,292 (equivalent to $1.21 million in 2025) contract funded a design study to evaluate the viability of a TBCC propulsion system, integrating one of several current turbine engines with a very-low-Mach-ignition Dual Mode Ramjet (DMRJ). NASA had previously funded a Lockheed Martin study that determined speeds up to Mach 7 were achievable with a dual-mode engine combining turbine and ramjet technologies. The primary challenge in hypersonic propulsion has been bridging the gap between the top speed of a turbojet (around Mach 2.2) and the minimum operational speed of a scramjet (Mach 4), as typical turbine engines cannot accelerate sufficiently for a scramjet to take over. The NASA-Lockheed Martin study explored options such as a higher-speed turbine engine or a scramjet operable within a turbine's slower flight envelope; the DARPA HTV-3X had demonstrated a low-speed ramjet (DMRJ) functional below Mach 3. Existing turbofan engines from jet fighters and experimental designs were considered for modification. If successful, NASA planned to fund a demonstrator to test the DMRJ in a flight research vehicle.

On December 15, 2014, NASA's Glenn Research Center awarded Aerojet Rocketdyne a $1,099,916 (equivalent to $1.5 million in 2025) contract to support mode-transition research. The two companies were reportedly collaborating on the TBCC propulsion system, aiming to begin development of the SR-72 hypersonic demonstrator in 2018, with an initial flight targeted for 2023.

=== 2015 to 2016 ===
In May 2015, the SR-72 was reported to be envisioned as an ISR and strike platform, though no specific payloads were identified—‌likely because existing payloads would be inadequate for an aircraft traveling at Mach 6 and up to 80,000 feet (24,400 m) altitude, requiring "hundreds of miles" to turn. New sensors and weapons would likely need to be developed specifically for such speeds.

In March 2016, Lockheed Martin CEO Marillyn Hewson announced that the company was on the verge of a technological breakthrough, enabling the SR-72 to reach Mach 6 and permitting a hypersonic demonstrator—‌roughly the size of an F-22 stealth fighter—‌to be constructed for under $1 billion.

=== 2017 to 2018 ===
In June 2017, Lockheed Martin announced that the SR-72 would enter development by the early 2020s, with a top speed exceeding Mach 6. Executive Vice President Rob Weiss remarked: "We've been saying hypersonics [are] two years away for the last 20 years, but all I can say is the technology is mature, and we, along with DARPA and the services, are working hard to get that capability into the hands of our warfighters as soon as possible."

In January 2018, Lockheed Martin Vice President Jack O'Banion delivered a presentation attributing advancements in additive manufacturing and computer modeling to the SR-72's feasibility, noting that building the aircraft five years earlier would have been impossible and that 3D printing enabled embedding a cooling system in the engine.

In February 2018, Orlando Carvalho, executive vice president of aeronautics at Lockheed Martin, refuted reports of the SR-72's development, stating that no such aircraft had been produced. He added that hypersonic research was driving weapons development: "Eventually as that technology is matured, it could ultimately enable the development of a reusable vehicle. Prior to this we may have referred to it as a 'like an SR-72', but now the terminology of choice is 'reusable vehicle'."

In November 2018, Lockheed Martin reported that a prototype of the SR-72 was scheduled to fly by 2025 and would be equipped to launch hypersonic missiles. As of 2026 no such prototype has been launched. The SR-72 could enter service in the 2030s.

=== 2026 ===
In September 2026, Jared Isaacman, Administrator of NASA, during his presentation, "A New Era for NASA and American Space Exploration" at the All-In Summit he mentioned rebuilding NASA's X-Plane portfolio. On the slideshow, it shows a image of a unknown plane similar to the SR-71 Blackbird.

== See also ==
- Aurora (aircraft)
- AVIC WZ-8
- AVIC Dark Sword
- Boeing X-51
- DARPA Falcon Project
- MD-22
- Prompt Global Strike
- Reaction Engines Scimitar
- Tupolev Tu-360
