= Multi-mission Affordable Capacity Effector =

- Type: Hypersonic Anti-ship missile
- Place of origin: United States

Service history
- In service: expected 2027
- Used by: United States Navy

Production history
- Manufacturer: Castelion

Specifications
- Warhead: 75 pounds (34 kg)
- Launch platform: F/A-18E/F; F-35A; F-35C

The Multi-mission Affordable Capacity Effector (MACE) is a planned U.S. Navy air-launched anti-ship hypersonic missile intended to focus on cost-effectiveness, extended range and increased lethality. It has been described as essentially a "miniature cruise missile". In 2026, Castelion's "Blackbeard" hypersonic missile was selected as the winner of the program.

It is designed as an air-launched weapon with adequate stand-off ranges to enable lethality while minimizing significant survivability risks to manned platforms. It will be launched from the F/A-18E/F Super Hornet, F-35A and F-35C, and its intended range and usage will complement the Long Range Anti-Ship Missile (LRASM) currently fielded on the U.S. Navy's F/A-18 and the U.S. Air Force's B-1B platforms. The design requirements state that four All-up Rounds (AURs) should be able to be carried internally on the F-35, in addition to external (pylon) carriage.

The Navy is interested in producing at least 500 missiles per year and would begin fielding an early version in FY2027. The cost per AUR is required to be no greater than $300,000. Production is also required to utilize digital engineering, WOSA compliance and design for export capability "that results in a modular weapon system capable of integrating alternative seekers, payloads and other subcomponents for different weapons variants as well as affordable upgrades to outpace adversaries without disrupting production throughput." Defense analysts have noted that the MACE request bears similarities to the Air Force's request for the Extended Range Attack Munition (ERAM).

== See also ==
- Hypersonic Air Launched Offensive Anti-Surface
- AGM-84 Harpoon
- GBU-39 Small Diameter Bomb
- GBU-53/B StormBreaker SDB II
- S8000 Banderol
