= ArcLight (missile) =

Missile development program

The ArcLight program was a missile development program of the Defense Advanced Research Projects Agency with the goal of equipping ships like Aegis cruisers with a weapon system capable of striking targets nearly anywhere on the globe, thereby increasing the power of surface ships to a level comparable to that of ballistic missile-equipped submarines.

According to DARPA, the ArcLight program was to develop a high-tech missile based on the booster stack of the current SM-3 and equipped with a hypersonic glide vehicle capable of carrying a 100–200 lb (45–90 kg) warhead. The configuration would allow ships carrying the ArcLight missile to strike targets 2,300 miles (3,700 km) away from the launch point. The missile would replace the aging Tomahawk cruise missile and could be fired out of the standard vertical launching systems available on many surface ships. Additionally, the ArcLight missile would be capable of launch from air and submarine assets capable of carrying the BGM-109.

Arthur Mabbett was the program manager of the DARPA project, which was to develop and test two different missile designs.

In DARPA's FY 2012 budget, the ArcLight missile program was terminated., the reason being that more development work was needed and they could not yet reach a high enough lift-to-drag ratio system from a non-fixed-wing vehicle. 2011 was spent reassessing technology needs, and no further funding was requested after that. DARPA commented that ArcLight was not part of Prompt Global Strike and was meant as a theater-based system to work with other systems such as the Tomahawk cruise missile.

== See also ==
- Prompt Global Strike
