= Hypersonic speed =

Speed that exceeds five times the speed of sound (Mach 5 and above)

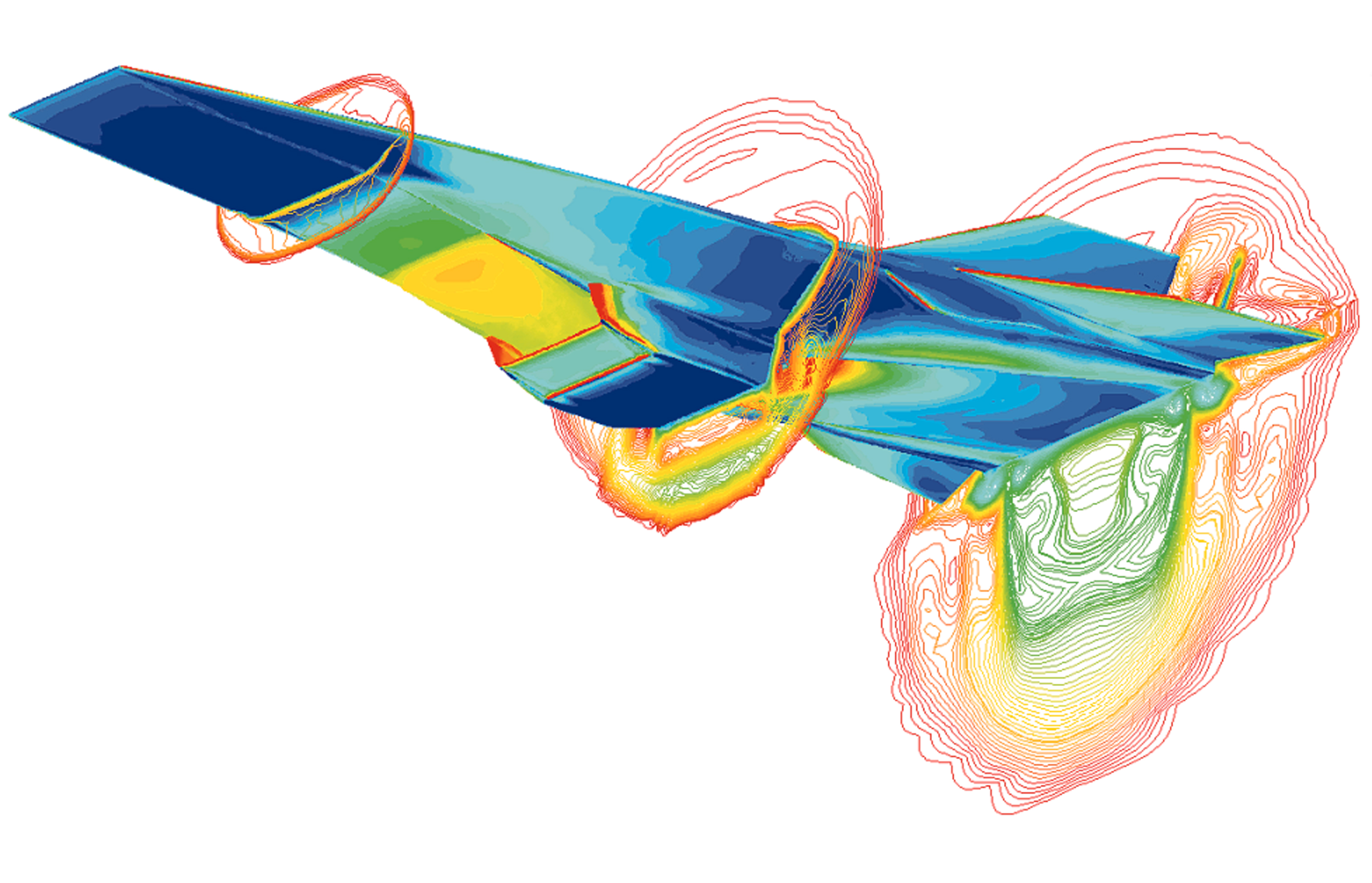
CFD image of the NASA X-43A at Mach 7

In aerodynamics, hypersonic speed refers to speeds much faster than the speed of sound, usually more than approximately Mach 5.

The precise Mach number at which a craft can be said to be flying at hypersonic speed varies, since individual physical changes in the airflow (like molecular dissociation and ionization) occur at different speeds; these effects collectively become important around Mach 5–10. The hypersonic regime can also be alternatively defined as speeds where specific heat capacity changes with the temperature of the flow as the kinetic energy of the moving object is converted into heat.

Hypersonic weapons are typically boost-glide vehicles or cruise missiles designed for aerodynamic flight and maneuvering above Mach 5.

High hypersonic speeds are experienced during atmospheric entry. Spaceplanes are designed to be capable of flight in this regime. The North American X-15 and the Space Shuttle orbiter are the only crewed spaceplanes to fly faster than Mach 5.

== Characteristics of flow ==
Simulation of hypersonic speed (Mach 5)

While the definition of hypersonic flow can be quite vague (Note: is generally debatable (especially because of the absence of discontinuity between supersonic and hypersonic flows)) a hypersonic flow may be characterized by certain physical phenomena at very fast supersonic flow.

The peculiarities in hypersonic flows are as follows:

1. Shock layer
2. Shock interaction - aerothermal: aerodynamic heating of the fuselage
3. Entropy layer
4. Real gas effects
5. Low density effects
6. Independence of aerodynamic coefficients with Mach number.

=== Small shock stand-off distance ===
As a body's Mach number increases, the density behind a bow shock generated by the body also increases, which corresponds to a decrease in volume behind the shock due to conservation of mass. Consequently, the distance between the bow shock and the body decreases at higher Mach numbers.

=== Entropy layer ===
As Mach numbers increase, the entropy change across the shock also increases, which results in a strong entropy gradient and highly vortical flow that mixes with the boundary layer.

=== Viscous interaction ===
A portion of the large kinetic energy associated with flow at high Mach numbers transforms into internal energy in the fluid due to viscous effects. The increase in internal energy is realized as an increase in temperature. Since the pressure gradient normal to the flow within a boundary layer is approximately zero for low to moderate hypersonic Mach numbers, the increase of temperature through the boundary layer coincides with a decrease in density. This causes the bottom of the boundary layer to expand, so that the boundary layer over the body grows thicker and can often merge with the shock wave near the body leading edge.

=== High-temperature flow ===
High temperatures due to a manifestation of viscous dissipation cause non-equilibrium chemical flow properties such as vibrational excitation and dissociation and ionization of molecules resulting in convective and radiative heat-flux.

== Classification of Mach regimes ==
Although "subsonic" and "supersonic" usually refer to speeds below and above the local speed of sound respectively, aerodynamicists often use these terms to refer to particular ranges of Mach values. When an aircraft approaches transonic speeds (around Mach 1), it enters a special regime. The usual approximations based on the Navier–Stokes equations, which work well for subsonic designs, start to break down because, even in the freestream, some parts of the flow locally exceed Mach 1. So, more sophisticated methods are needed to handle this complex behavior.

The "supersonic regime" usually refers to the set of Mach numbers for which linearized theory may be used; for example, where the (air) flow is not chemically reacting and where heat transfer between air and vehicle may be reasonably neglected in calculations. Generally, NASA defines "high" hypersonic as any Mach number from 10 to 25, and re-entry speeds as anything greater than Mach 25. Among the spacecraft operating in these regimes are returning Soyuz and Dragon space capsules; the previously-operated Space Shuttle; various reusable spacecraft in development such as SpaceX Starship and Rocket Lab Electron; and (theoretical) spaceplanes.

In the following table, the "regimes" or "ranges of Mach values" are referenced instead of the usual meanings of "subsonic" and "supersonic".

Regime	Mach No	Speed	General characteristics	Aircraft	Missiles/warheads
Subsonic	< 1	<614 mph (988 km/h; 274 m/s)	Most often propeller-driven and commercial turbofan aircraft with high-aspect-ratio (slender) wings, and rounded features like the nose and leading edges. The subsonic speed range is that range of speeds within which, all of the airflow over an aircraft is less than Mach 1. The critical Mach number (Mcrit) is lowest free stream Mach number at which airflow over any part of the aircraft first reaches Mach 1. So the subsonic speed range includes all speeds that are less than Mcrit.	All commercial aircraft	—
Transonic	0.8–1.2	614–921 mph (988–1,482 km/h; 274–412 m/s)	Transonic aircraft nearly always have swept wings that delay drag-divergence and supercritical wings to delay the onset of wave drag and often feature designs adhering to the principles of the Whitcomb area rule. The transonic speed range is that range of speeds within which the airflow over different parts of an aircraft is between subsonic and supersonic. So the regime of flight from Mcrit up to Mach 1.3 is called the transonic range.	(United States) Northrop X-4 Bantam (Mach 0.9)	—
Supersonic	> 1	921–3,836 mph (1,482–6,173 km/h; 412–1,715 m/s)	The supersonic speed range is that range of speeds within which all of the airflow over an aircraft is supersonic (more than Mach 1). But airflow meeting the leading edges is initially decelerated, so the free stream speed must be slightly greater than Mach 1 to ensure that all of the flow over the aircraft is supersonic. It is commonly accepted that the supersonic speed range starts at a free stream speed greater than Mach 1.3. Aircraft designed to fly at supersonic speeds show large differences in their aerodynamic design because of the radical differences in the behavior of flows above Mach 1. Sharp edges, thin aerofoil-sections, and all-moving tailplane/canards are common. Modern combat aircraft must compromise in order to maintain low-speed handling; "true" supersonic designs, generally incorporating delta wings, are rarer.	(United States) XB-70 Valkyrie (Mach 3); (United States) SR-71 Blackbird (Mach 3); BAC/Aérospatiale Concorde (Mach 2); (Soviet Union) Tupolev Tu-144 (Mach 2)	—
Hypersonic	> 5	3,836–7,673 mph (6,173–12,348 km/h; 1,715–3,430 m/s)	Cooled nickel or titanium skin; small wings. The design is highly integrated, instead of assembled from separate independently-designed components, due to the domination of interference effects, where small changes in any one component will cause large changes in air flow around all other components, which in turn affects their behavior. The result is that no one component can be designed without knowing how all other components will affect all of the air flows around the craft, and any changes to any one component may require a redesign of all other components simultaneously.	(United States) North American X-15 (Mach 6.7); (United States) NASA X-43 (Mach 9.6); (United States) Boeing X-51 Waverider (Mach 5)	(Russia) (India) BrahMos-II (Mach 8); (Russia) Kh-47M2 Kinzhal (Mach 10); (Russia) 3M22 Zircon (Mach 8-9); (China) DF-ZF (Mach 5–10); (India) HSTDV (Mach 6); (North Korea) Hwasong-8 (Mach 6–10)
High-Hypersonic	[10–25)	7,673–19,180 mph (12,348–30,867 km/h; 3,430–8,574 m/s)	Thermal control becomes a dominant design consideration. Structure must either be designed to operate hot, or be protected by special silicate tiles or similar. Chemically reacting flow can also cause corrosion of the vehicle's skin, with free-atomic oxygen featuring in very high-speed flows. Hypersonic designs are often forced into blunt configurations because of the aerodynamic heating rising with a reduced radius of curvature.	—	(Soviet Union) 53T6 (Mach 17); (United States) HTV 2 (Mach 20); (India) Agni-V (Mach 24); (China) DF-41 (Mach 25); (France) M51 (Mach 25); (Russia) Avangard (Mach 20–27)
Re-entry speeds	≥25	≥19,180 mph (30,870 km/h; 8,570 m/s)	Ablative heat shield; small or no wings; blunt shape. See reentry capsule.	(United States) Space Shuttle orbiter (Mach 22); (Soviet Union) Buran; (United States) Boeing X-37 (Mach 25); (China) Reusable experimental spacecraft (~Mach 25); IXV (Mach 22)	(Russia) Avangard (Mach 20–27); (France) M51 (Mach 25)

== Similarity parameters ==
The categorization of airflow relies on a number of similarity parameters, which allow the simplification of a nearly infinite number of test cases into groups of similarity. For transonic and compressible flow, the Mach and Reynolds numbers alone allow good categorization of many flow cases.

Hypersonic flows, however, require other similarity parameters. First, the analytic equations for the oblique shock angle become nearly independent of Mach number at high (~>10) Mach numbers. Second, the formation of strong shocks around aerodynamic bodies means that the freestream Reynolds number is less useful as an estimate of the behavior of the boundary layer over a body (although it is still important). Finally, the increased temperature of hypersonic flow mean that real gas effects become important. Research in hypersonics is therefore often called aerothermodynamics, rather than aerodynamics.

The introduction of real gas effects means that more variables are required to describe the full state of a gas. Whereas a stationary gas can be described by three variables (pressure, temperature, adiabatic index), and a moving gas by four (flow velocity), a hot gas in chemical equilibrium also requires state equations for the chemical components of the gas, and a gas in nonequilibrium solves those state equations using time as an extra variable. This means that for nonequilibrium flow, something between 10 and 100 variables may be required to describe the state of the gas at any given time. Additionally, rarefied hypersonic flows (usually defined as those with a Knudsen number above 0.1) do not follow the Navier–Stokes equations.

Hypersonic flows are typically categorized by their total energy, expressed as total enthalpy (MJ/kg), total pressure (kPa-MPa), stagnation pressure (kPa-MPa), stagnation temperature (K), or flow velocity (km/s).

Wallace D. Hayes developed a similarity parameter, similar to the Whitcomb area rule, which allowed similar configurations to be compared. In the study of hypersonic flow over slender bodies, the product of the freestream Mach number $M_{\infty}$ and the flow deflection angle $\theta$, known as the hypersonic similarity parameter:
$$K = M_{\infty}\theta$$
is considered to be an important governing parameter. The slenderness ratio of a vehicle $\tau = d/l$, where $d$ is the diameter and $l$ is the length, is often substituted for $\theta$.

== Regimes ==
Hypersonic flow can be approximately separated into a number of regimes. The selection of these regimes is rough, due to the blurring of the boundaries where a particular effect can be found.

=== Perfect gas ===
In this regime, the gas can be regarded as an ideal gas. Flow in this regime is still Mach number dependent. Simulations start to depend on the use of a constant-temperature wall, rather than the adiabatic wall typically used at lower speeds. The lower border of this region is around Mach 5, where ramjets become inefficient, and the upper border around Mach 10–12.

=== Two-temperature ideal gas ===
This is a subset of the perfect gas regime, where the gas can be considered chemically perfect, but the rotational and vibrational temperatures of the gas must be considered separately, leading to two temperature models. See particularly the modeling of supersonic nozzles, where vibrational freezing becomes important.

=== Dissociated gas ===
In this regime, diatomic or polyatomic gases (the gases found in most atmospheres) begin to dissociate as they come into contact with the bow shock generated by the body. Surface catalysis plays a role in the calculation of surface heating, meaning that the type of surface material also has an effect on the flow. The lower border of this regime is where any component of a gas mixture first begins to dissociate in the stagnation point of a flow (which for nitrogen is around 2000 K). At the upper border of this regime, the effects of ionization start to have an effect on the flow.

=== Ionized gas ===
In this regime the ionized electron population of the stagnated flow becomes significant, and the electrons must be modeled separately. Often the electron temperature is handled separately from the temperature of the remaining gas components. This region occurs for freestream flow velocities around 3–4 km/s. Gases in this region are modeled as non-radiating plasmas.

=== Radiation-dominated regime ===
Above around 12 km/s, the heat transfer to a vehicle changes from being conductively dominated to radiatively dominated. The modeling of gases in this regime is split into two classes:

1. Optically thin: where the gas does not re-absorb radiation emitted from other parts of the gas
2. Optically thick: where the radiation must be considered a separate source of energy.

The modeling of optically thick gases is extremely difficult, since, due to the calculation of the radiation at each point, the computation load theoretically expands exponentially as the number of points considered increases.

== See also ==
- Hypersonic glide vehicle
- Supersonic transport
- Lifting body
- Atmospheric entry
- Hypersonic flight
- DARPA Falcon Project
- Reaction Engines Skylon (design study)
- Reaction Engines A2 (design study)
- HyperSoar (concept)
- Boeing X-51 Waverider
- X-20 Dyna-Soar (cancelled)
- Rockwell X-30 (cancelled)
- Avatar RLV (2001 Indian concept study)
- Hypersonic Technology Demonstrator Vehicle (Indian project)
- Ayaks (Russian wave rider project from the 1990s)
- Avangard (Russian hypersonic glide vehicle, in service)
- DF-ZF (Chinese hypersonic glide vehicle, operational)
- Lockheed Martin SR-72 (planned)
- WZ-8 Chinese Hypersonic surveillance UAV (In Service)
- MD-22 Chinese Hypersonic Unmanned combat aerial vehicle (In development)

Engines

- Rocket engine
- Ramjet
- Scramjet
- Reaction Engines SABRE, LAPCAT (design studies)

Missiles

- 3M22 Zircon Anti-ship hypersonic cruise missile (Russia) (in production)
- BrahMos-II Cruise Missile – (India) (Russia) (Under Development)

Other flow regimes

- Subsonic flight
- Transonic
- Supersonic speed
