= Castelion =

Aerospace corporation

Castelion is a defense manufacturing company in El Segundo, California, formed in 2025, by eight senior SpaceX Starshield leaders, to develop mass-produced hypersonic weapons, potentially for use as space-based interceptors.

== Products ==
- Blackbeard hypersonic missile
