= Hypersonic glide vehicle =

Ballistic missile warhead type

A hypersonic glide vehicle (HGV) is a type of warhead for ballistic missiles that can maneuver and glide at hypersonic speed. It is used in conjunction with ballistic missiles to significantly change their trajectories after launch. Conventional ballistic missiles follow a predictable ballistic trajectory and are vulnerable to interception by the latest anti-ballistic missile (ABM) systems. The in-flight maneuverability of HGVs makes them unpredictable, allowing them to effectively evade air defenses. As of 2022, hypersonic glide vehicles are the subject of an arms race.

== Projects ==
=== China ===
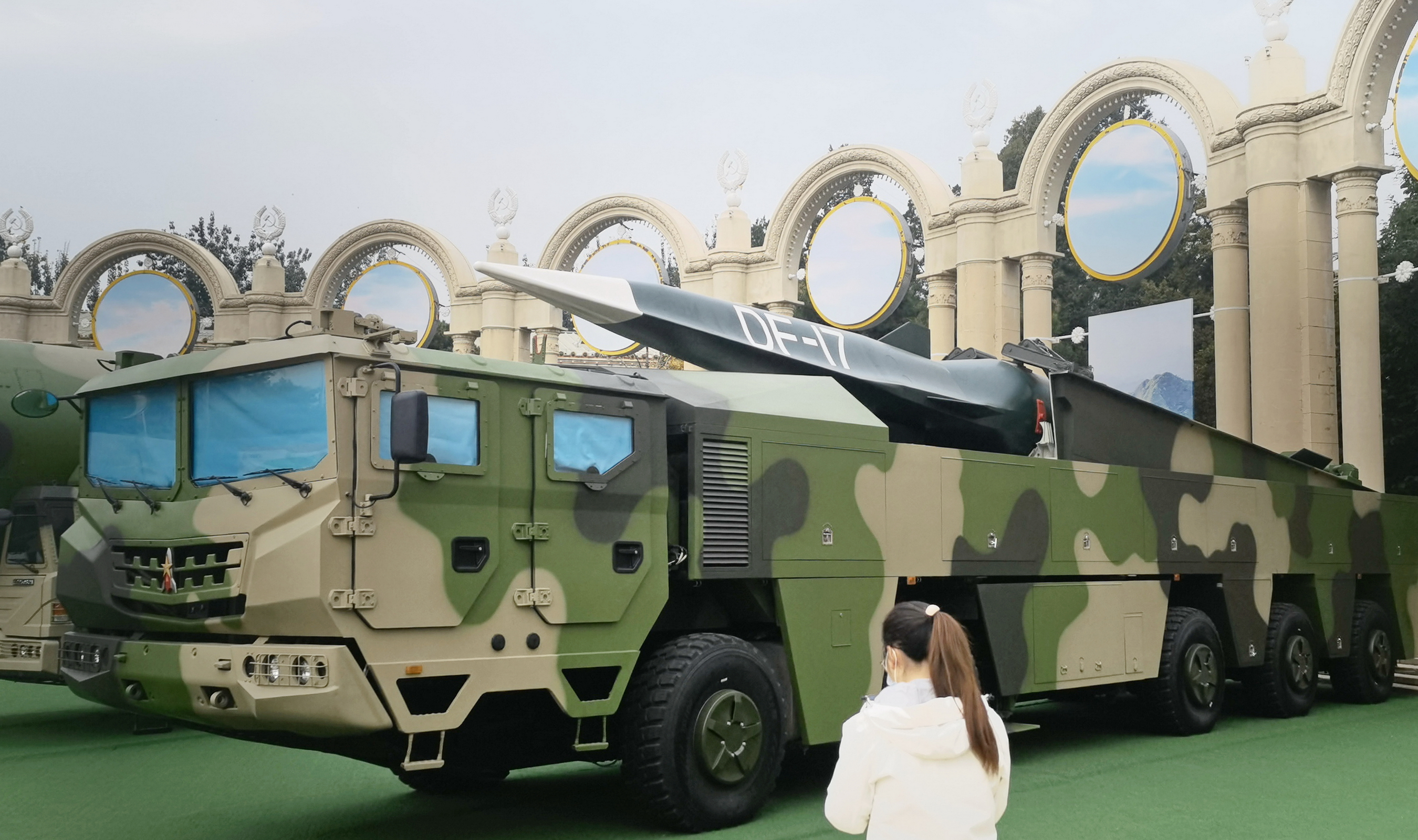
Chinese DF-ZF hypersonic glide vehicle mounted on the DF-17 ballistic missile.

- DF-ZF
- DF-27
- YJ-17

=== France ===
- VMAX (first flight test took place on June 26, 2023, from the DGA's site in Biscarrosse and was successful).
- VMaX-2 (under development)

=== India ===
- Dhvani (under development)
- ET-LDHCM (Project Vishnu)
- LRAShM
- BM-04 (under development)

=== Iran ===
- Fattah-2

=== Japan ===
- Hyper Velocity Gliding Projectile (HVGP) (under development)

=== North Korea ===
- Hwasong-8
- Hwasong-11E (Hwasong-11Ma, revealed in October 2025)
- Hwasong-11E-1 (Hwasong-11Ma-1, unveiled and tested in September 2026)
- Hwasong-12B (not tested yet). It is possible that the Hwasong-12B was renamed from Hwasong-8.
- Hwasong-16B (tested in April 2024).

There have also been reports of other hypersonic glide vehicle being mounted on the other ballistic missiles.

=== Russia ===
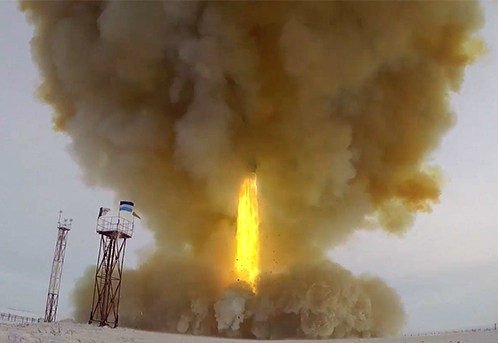
Launch of the UR-100UTTKh ICBM, carrying the Avangard HGV, from Dombarovsky Air Base

- Avangard Mach 20

=== US ===
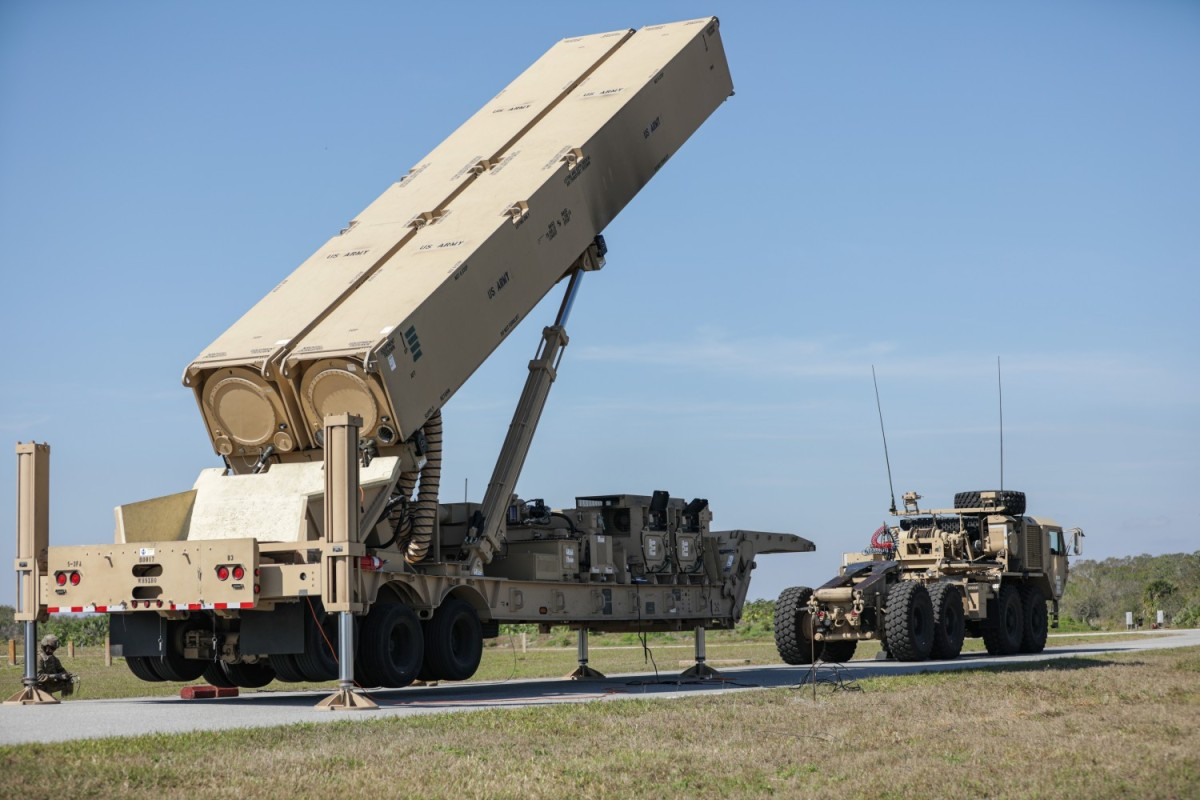
American Long-Range Hypersonic Weapon being deployed at the Cape Canaveral Space Force Station

- Hypersonic Technology Vehicle 2 (experimental)
- AGM-183 Air-launched Rapid Response Weapon (ARRW) (under development)
- OpFires
- Common-Hypersonic Glide Body (C-HGB) (in development for US Army (LRHW) and US Navy Conventional Prompt Strike (CPS))
- Next Generation Glide Body (NXGB) (Lockheed Martin)
- Multi-mission Affordable Capacity Effector (MACE) also known as Blackbeard (Castelion) (under development)

=== South Korea ===
South Korea tested a domestically developed HGV on October 8th, 2026.

== Countermeasures ==
Boost-glide weapons are generally designed to avoid existing missile defense systems, either by continually maneuvering or by flying at lower altitudes to reduce warning time. This generally makes such weapons easier to intercept using defensive systems intended for lower-altitude "low-tier" targets. Flying at lower speeds than short-range ballistic missile warheads makes them easier to attack. Those that approach with very low terminal attack profiles are even subject to attack by modern hypervelocity guns and railguns. The evasion capabilities that HGVs employ are largely limited to the upper atmospheric flight span.

== See also ==
- Hypersonic flight
- Hypersonic weapon
- Maneuverable reentry vehicle
- Multiple independently targetable reentry vehicle
- Non-ballistic atmospheric entry
