= DARPA Falcon Project =

US program to develop a hypersonic weapon

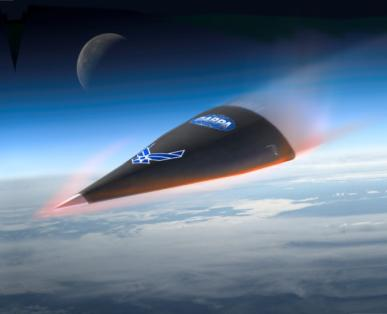
Illustration of Hypersonic Test Vehicle (HTV) 2 reentry phase

The DARPA FALCON Project (Force Application and Launch from Continental United States) was a two-part joint project between the Defense Advanced Research Projects Agency (DARPA) and the United States Air Force (USAF) and is part of Prompt Global Strike. The first part of the project aimed to develop a Small Launch System (SLS) capable of accelerating hypersonic gliding weapons as well as launching small satellites into Earth orbit. The second part of the project aimed to develop Hypersonic Weapon Systems (HWS): a short term high performance hypersonic gliding weapon previously named the X-41 Common Aero Vehicle (CAV) that could be launched from Expendable Launch Vehicles (ELVs), Reusable Launch Vehicles (RLVs), Hypersonic Cruise Vehicles (HCVs), or Space Maneuvering Vehicles (SMPs), and a long term hypersonic cruise aircraft named the Hypersonic Cruise Vehicle (HCV). This two-part program was announced in 2003 and continued into 2006.

Current research under Falcon project is centered on the flight tests of boost-glide technological demonstrators HTV-1 and HTV-2 for the development of the X-41 Common Aero Vehicle (CAV) and HTV-3 for the Hypersonic Cruise Vehicle (HCV). The technological demonstrator Hypersonic Technology Vehicle 2 (HTV-2) first flew on 22 April 2010; the second test flew 11 August 2011 reaching Mach 20. Both flights ended prematurely.

The HTV-3X Blackswift, derived from HTV-3, was a technological demonstrator of the HCV which would take off from a runway and accelerate to Mach 6 (7,400 km/h; 4,600 mph) before completing its mission and landing again. The memorandum of understanding (MoU) between DARPA and the USAF on Blackswift was signed in September 2007. The Blackswift HTV-3X did not receive needed funding and was cancelled in October 2008.

== Design and development ==
=== Past projects ===
The aim was always to be able to deploy a craft from the continental United States, which could reach anywhere on the planet within one to two hours. The X-20 Dyna-Soar in 1957 was the first publicly acknowledged program—although this would have been launched vertically on a rocket and then glided back to Earth, as the Space Shuttle did, rather than taking off from a runway. Originally, the Shuttle was envisaged as a part-USAF operation, and separate military launch facilities were built at Vandenberg AFB at great cost, though never used. After the open DynaSoar USAF program from 1957 to 1963, spaceplanes went black (became highly classified). In the mid-1960s, the CIA began work on a high-Mach spyplane called Project Isinglass. This developed into Rheinberry, a design for a Mach-17 air-launched reconnaissance aircraft, which was later canceled.

According to Henry F. Cooper, who was the Director of the Strategic Defense Initiative ("Star Wars") under President Reagan, spaceplane projects consumed $4 billion of funding in the 1970s, 1980s and 1990s (excluding the Space Shuttle). This does not include the 1950 and 1960s budgets for the Dynasoar, ISINGLASS, Rheinberry, and any 21st-century spaceplane project which might emerge under Falcon. He told the United States Congress in 2001 that all the United States had in return for those billions of dollars was "one crashed vehicle, a hangar queen, some drop-test articles and static displays". Falcon was allocated US$170 million for budget year 2008.

==== HyperSoar ====
The HyperSoar was an American hypersonic aircraft project developed at Lawrence Livermore National Laboratory (LLNL). It was to be capable of flying at around Mach 12 (6,700 mph), allowing it to transit between any two points on the globe in under two hours. The HyperSoar was predicted to be a passenger plane capable of skipping outside the atmosphere to prevent it from burning up in the atmosphere. A trip from Chicago to Tokyo (10,123 kilometers) would take 18 skips, or 72 minutes. It was planned to use hydrocarbon-based engines outside the atmosphere and experimental jet engine technology. and in 2002 it was combined with the USAF X-41 Common Aero Vehicle to form the FALCON program.

=== FALCON ===
The overall FALCON (Force Application and Launch from CONtinental United States) program announced in 2003 had two major components: a small launch vehicle for carrying payloads to orbit or launching the hypersonic weapons platform payload, and the hypersonic vehicle itself.

==== Small Launch Vehicle ====
The DARPA FALCON solicitation in 2003 asked for bidders to do development work on proposed vehicles in a first phase of work, then one or more vendors would be selected to build and fly an actual launch vehicle. Companies which won first phase development contracts of $350,000 to $540,000 in November 2003 included:

- AirLaunch LLC, Reno Nevada
- Andrews Space Inc., Seattle Washington
- Exquadrum Inc., Victorville California.
- KT Engineering, Huntsville Alabama
- Lockheed Martin Corp., New Orleans Louisiana
- Microcosm Inc., El Segundo California
- Orbital Sciences Corp., Dulles Virginia
- Schafer Corp., Chelmsford Massachusetts
- Space Exploration Technologies, Hawthorne California

==== Hypersonic Weapon System ====
The first phase of the Hypersonic Weapon System development was won by three bidders in 2003, each receiving a $1.2 to $1.5 million contract for hypersonic vehicle development:

- Andrews Space Inc., Seattle, Wash.
- Lockheed Martin Corp., Lockheed Martin Aeronautics Co., Palmdale, Calif.
- Northrop Grumman Corp., Air Combat Systems, El Segundo, Calif.

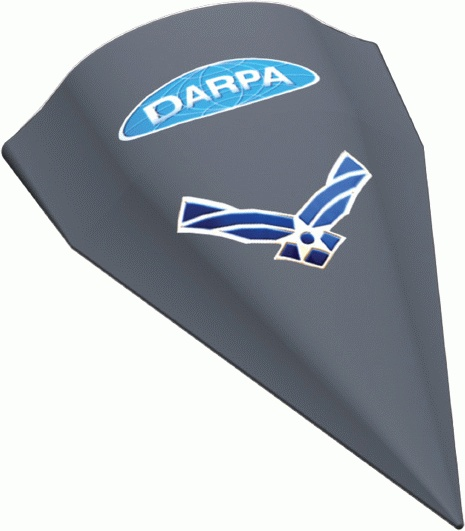
Illustration of HTV-2 from DARPA

Lockheed Martin received the only Phase 2 HWS contract in 2004, to develop technologies further and reduce technology risk on the program. The second phase of the Hypersonic Weapon System development was to perform a set of flight tests with a series of boost-glide Hypersonic Technology Vehicles (HTVs).

- HTV-1: a low performance hypersonic glider, originally planned to fly in September 2007, now canceled because it was found not possible to manufacture the leading edges.
- HTV-2: a high performance hypersonic glider, first flew on 22 April 2010 but contact was lost soon after booster separation, second flew on 11 August 2011 but control was lost after the beginning of the glider trajectory
- HTV-3: a hypersonic glider including technologies for a reusable hypersonic cruise aircraft, then derived in HTV-3X and now canceled

In parallel, some work was still dedicated to the conceptual development of a Hypersonic Cruise Vehicle (HCV) that would be able to fly 9,000 nautical miles (17,000 km) in 2 hours with a payload of 12,000 lb (5,500 kg). It would fly at a high altitude and achieve speeds of up to Mach 9.

==== HTV-3X Blackswift ====
The Blackswift was derived from the HTV-3 and proposed a technological demonstration of a reusable aircraft capable of hypersonic flight designed by the Lockheed Martin Skunk Works, Boeing, and ATK.

The USAF stated that the "Blackswift flight demonstration vehicle will be powered by a combination of turbine engine and ramjet, an all-in-one power plant. The turbine engine accelerates the vehicle to around Mach 3 before the ramjet takes over and boosts the vehicle up to Mach 6." Dr. Steven Walker, the Deputy Director of DARPA's Tactical Technology Office, will be coordinating the project. He told the USAF website,

I will also be communicating to Lockheed Martin and Pratt & Whitney on how important it is that we get the technical plan in place ... I'm trying to build the bridge at the beginning of the program—to get the communication path flowing.

Dr. Walker also stated,

We need to fly some hypersonic vehicles—first the expendables, then the reusables—in order to prove to decision makers that this isn't just a dream… We won't overcome the skepticism until we see some hypersonic vehicles flying.

In October 2008 it was announced that HTV-3X or Blackswift did not receive needed funding in the fiscal year 2009 defense budget and had been canceled.

Computer simulations of the Falcon HTV-3X vehicle

Falcon HTV-3X

The HTV-3X activates its turbojets in transonic flight...

...then ignites its scramjets for the hypersonic phase

HTV-3X on approach to Edwards Air Force Base

== Flight testing ==
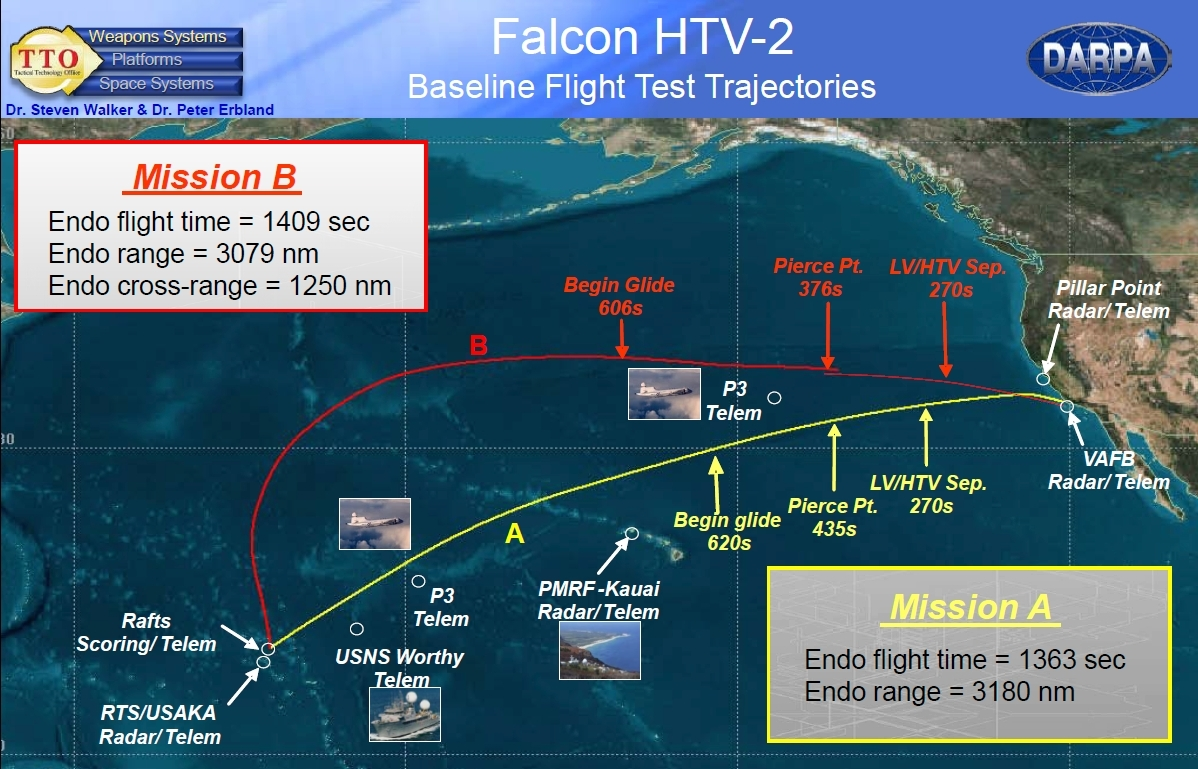
Flight Test trajectories for HTV 2a and 2b

DARPA had two HTV-2s built for flight tests in 2010 and 2011. Falcon HTV-2 was successfully launched twice though both vehicles were subsequently lost to failure due to loss of communication. This resulted in uncontrolled crashes of both systems into the ocean.

The Minotaur IV light rocket was the booster for the HTV-2 with Vandenberg Space Force Base (known as Vandenberg Air Force Base from 1957-2021) serving as the launch site. DARPA planned the flights to demonstrate thermal protection systems and aerodynamic control features. Test flights were supported by NASA, the Space and Missile Systems Center, Lockheed Martin, Sandia National Laboratories and the Air Force Research Laboratory's (AFRL) Air Vehicles and Space Vehicles Directorates.

The first HTV-2 flight was launched on 22 April 2010. The HTV-2 glider was to fly 4,800 miles (7,700 km) across the Pacific to Kwajalein at Mach 20. The launch was successful, but reports stated that contact with the vehicle had been lost nine minutes into the mission. In mid-November, DARPA revealed that the test flight had ended when the computer autopilot had "commanded flight termination". According to a DARPA spokesman, "When the onboard system detects [undesirable or unsafe flight] behavior, it forces itself into a controlled roll and pitchover to descend directly into the ocean." Reviews found that the craft had begun to roll violently.

A second flight was launched on 11 August 2011. The unmanned Falcon HTV-2 successfully separated from the booster and entered the mission's glide phase, but again lost contact with control about nine minutes into its planned 30-minute Mach 20 glide flight. Initial reports indicated it purposely impacted the Pacific Ocean along its planned flight path as a safety precaution. Some analysts thought that the second failure would result in an overhaul of the Falcon program.

=== Refocus ===
In July 2013, DARPA decided it would not conduct a third flight test of the HTV-2 because enough data had been collected from the first two flights, and another test was not thought to provide any more usable data for the cost. The tests provided data on flight aerodynamics and high-temperature effects on the aeroshell. Work on the HTV-2 would continue to summer 2014 to provide more study on hypersonic flight. The HTV-2 was the last active part of the Falcon program. DARPA has now changed its focus for the program from global/strategic strike to high-speed tactical deployment to penetrate air defenses and hit targets quickly from a safe distance.

== See also ==
- Boeing X-51
- Prompt Global Strike, a follow-on military project
- Rockwell X-30 (National AeroSpace Plane)
- Lockheed Martin SR-72
- Boost-glide
