= Avangard (hypersonic glide vehicle) =

Russian missile

Avangard Авангард
- Type: Hypersonic glide vehicle
- Place of origin: Russia

Service history
- In service: 2019–present
- Used by: Strategic Rocket Forces

Production history
- Designer: Moscow Institute of Thermal Technology
- Manufacturer: Votkinsk Machine Building Plant
- Produced: 2018–present

Specifications
- Mass: ~2 tonnes (4,400 lb)
- Length: 5.4 m
- Blast yield: unknown
- Launch platform: ICBM R-36M2, RS-28, UR-100

The Avangard (Russian: Авангард, "Vanguard"; previously known as Objekt 4202, Yu-71 and Yu-74) is a Russian hypersonic glide vehicle (HGV). It can be carried as a multiple independently targetable reentry vehicle (MIRV) payload of heavy intercontinental ballistic missiles (ICBMs), such as the UR-100UTTKh, R-36M2 and RS-28 Sarmat. It can deliver both nuclear and conventional payloads. Russia has claimed that the Avangard can reach speeds of over Mach 20

The Avangard was one of six new Russian strategic weapons unveiled by Russian president Vladimir Putin on 1 March 2018.

== History ==
Launch of the UR-100UTTKh ICBM, carrying the Avangard HGV, Dombarovsky Air Base, 26 December 2018

According to Russian president Vladimir Putin, the US withdrawal from the ABM Treaty in 2002 forced Russia to start developing hypersonic weapons: "We had to create these [hypersonic] weapons in response to the US deployment of a strategic missile defense system, which in the future would be capable of virtually neutralizing, zeroing out all our nuclear potential." In 2007, when asked about U.S. plans to deploy ballistic missile defenses in Europe, Putin mentioned that Russia was developing "strategic weapons systems of a completely different type that will fly at hypersonic speed and will be able to change trajectory both in terms of altitude and direction".

In October 2016, a flight test was carried out using a R-36M2 heavy ICBM launched from Dombarovsky Air Base, reportedly successfully hitting a target at the Kura Missile Test Range. This was reportedly the first fully successful test of the glide vehicle.

On 1 March 2018, Putin, in his presidential address to the Federal Assembly in Moscow, announced that testing of the weapon is now complete and that it has entered serial production. This was further confirmed by the commander of the Strategic Rocket Forces, Colonel General Sergey Karakayev.

On 19 September 2020, Herbert Yefremov, an Advisor for Science at the NPO Mashinostroyenia, was awarded the Order of St. Andrew for his contributions to the development of Avangard.

== Design ==
HGVs differ from traditional ballistic missile warheads by virtue of their ability to maneuver and operate at lower altitudes. The combination of maneuverability and high speed poses significant challenges for conventional missile defense. With the advantage again swinging toward attack, R. Jeffrey Smith speculates that weapons of this type will reignite the kind of arms race that dominated the Cold War era.

According to open-source analysis by Janes Information Services, Avangard is a pure glide vehicle without an independent propulsion system. When approaching a target, the glider supposedly is capable of sharp high speed horizontal and vertical evasive maneuvers in flight.

Russia has claimed that the Avangard can reach speeds of over Mach 20.

== Operators ==
Russia

- Strategic Rocket Forces – The Strategic Rocket Forces are the only operator of the Avangard HGV. As of May 2025, 12 Avangard-equipped UR-100N UTTHs are deployed with the 13th Red Banner Rocket Division at Yasny, Orenburg Oblast.

== See also ==
- Boeing X-51 Waverider – Uncrewed hypersonic experimental aircraft
- DARPA Falcon Project – US program to develop a hypersonic weapon
- DF-ZF – Chinese experimental hypersonic glide vehicle
- Dhvani (hypersonic glide vehicle) – Indian winged hypersonic glide vehicle
- Oreshnik (missile) – Russian intermediate-range ballistic missile
- Prompt Global Strike – US defense project
- Silbervogel – Proposed sub-orbital bomber
- Tupolev Tu-130 – Concept of a nuclear missile
