= Hypersonic Technology Vehicle 2 =

Experimental hypersonic glide vehicle

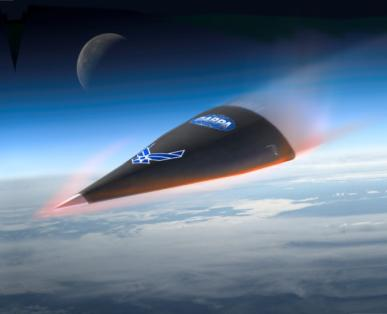
Hypersonic Technology Vehicle HTV-2 reentry (artist's impression)

Hypersonic Technology Vehicle 2 (HTV-2) is an experimental hypersonic glide vehicle developed as part of the DARPA Falcon Project designed to fly in the Mach 20 range. It is a test bed for technologies to provide the United States with the capability to reach any target in the world within one hour (Conventional Prompt Strike) using an unmanned hypersonic bomber aircraft.

== Development ==
The DARPA/AF Falcon Hypersonic Technology Vehicle (HTV) demonstration program was designed to enable the in-flight demonstration of the key enabling technologies required for a reusable, global reach, aircraft-like Hypersonic Cruise Vehicle (HCV). The overall program began in the fall of 2003 to develop program plans and conceptual designs for an incremental hypersonic technology development and demonstration approach represented by the following technology flight vehicles: HTV-1, HTV-2, and HTV-3X leading to the HCV vision vehicle. Due to manufacturing issues with the HTV-1 originally proposed one-piece carbon-carbon aeroshell, work on HTV-1 did not continue beyond CDR. HTV-2, a higher endurance and more capable vehicle, was pursued with a 'Design for Manufacturing' approach to the aeroshell.

The Falcon HTV-2 program had two test flights, both ending within approximately nine minutes from launch. Both these tests were funded by the US Defense Advanced Research Projects Agency (DARPA) to help develop hypersonic technologies and to demonstrate its effectiveness. Under the original plan, HTV-1 was to feature a hypersonic lift-to-drag ratio of 2.5, increasing to 3.0-3.2 for the HTV-2 and 4.5 for the HTV-3. The actual lift-to-drag ratio of HTV-2 was estimated to be 2.6.

HTV-2 was to lead to the development of an HTV-3X vehicle, known as Blackswift, which would have formed the basis for deployment around 2015 of a reusable Hypersonic Cruise Vehicle, an unmanned aircraft capable of taking off from a conventional runway with a 5,400 kg (12,000 lb) payload to strike targets 16,650 km away in under 2 hours. The HCV would have required a lift-to-drag ratio of 6-7 at Mach 10 and 130,000 ft (40,000m).

HTV-2 was expected to demonstrate controllable flight at velocities of around Mach 20, i.e., a capability that can reach anywhere in the world in less than an hour. At that speed, the flight time between New York City and Los Angeles would be less than 12 minutes.

== Design ==
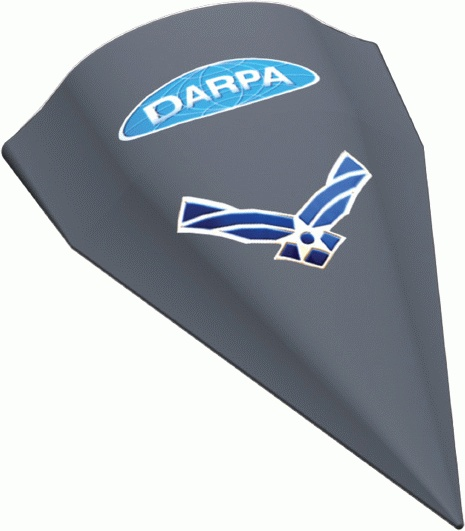
DARPA's Falcon Hypersonic Technology Vehicle-2 is arrowhead-shaped.

Development of protection structures that are tough and lightweight; an aerodynamic shape that has a high lift to drag ratio; and automatic navigation control systems were among the initial technical challenges facing the designers. The various departments involved in designing the vehicle included aerothermodynamics, materials science, hypersonic navigation, guidance and control systems, endo- and exo-atmospheric flight dynamics, telemetry and range safety analysis. The craft could cover 17,000 kilometres (11,000 mi), the distance between London and Sydney, in 49 minutes.

Built by Lockheed Martin, the HTV-2 is made of carbon composite material; the durability of such material was needed to protect important internal components from being destroyed by atmospheric heating. The surface temperature of the HTV-2 was expected to reach 1,930 °C (3,500 °F) or more in flight; steel melts at 1,370 °C (2,500 °F).

== Flight testing ==
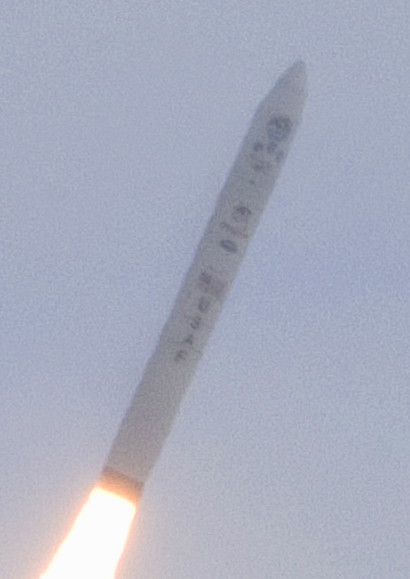
Launch of HTV-2a on a Minotaur IV Lite rocket

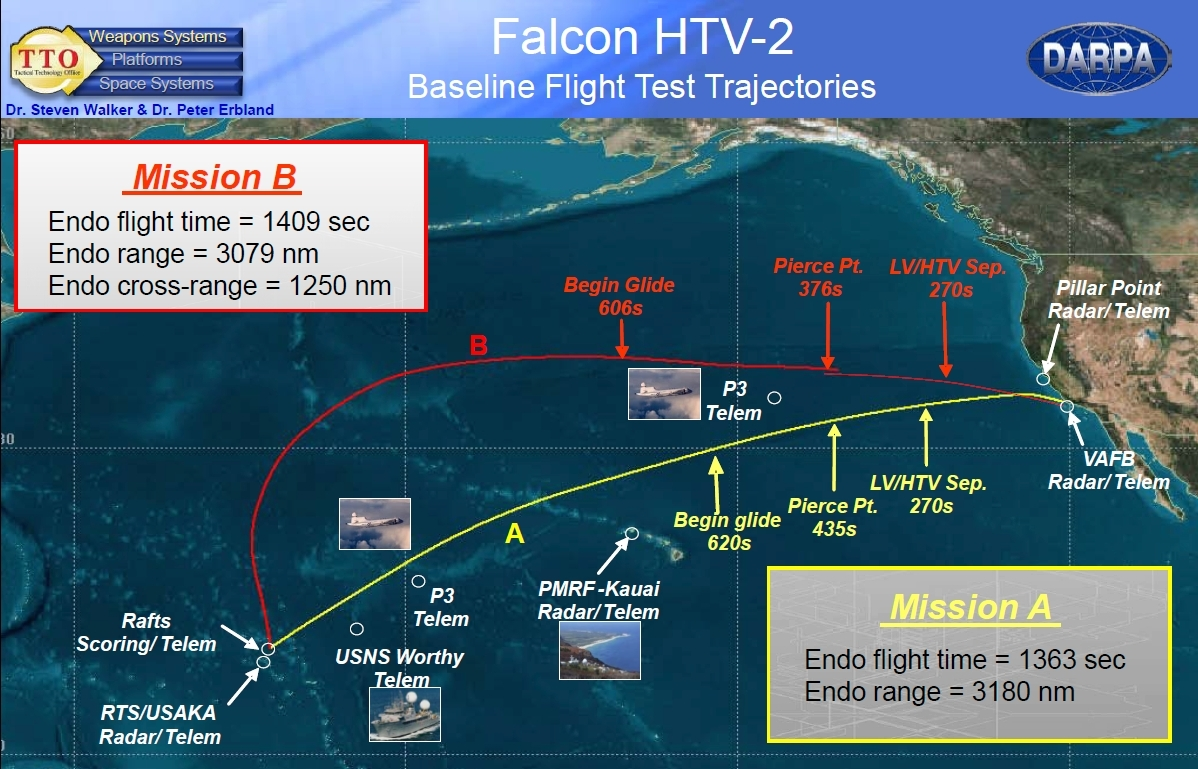
Falcon HTV-2 baseline flight test trajectories

Both flights reached Mach 20 (high-hypersonic speed) and lost telemetry at 9 minutes of a planned 30-minute mission.

The HTV-2's first flight was launched on 22 April 2010. The HTV-2 glider was to fly 4,800 miles (7,700 km) across the Pacific to Kwajalein at Mach 20. The HTV-2 was boosted by a Minotaur IV Lite rocket launched from Vandenberg Air Force Base, California; the glider was carried inside the nose of the Minotaur IV Lite rocket into outer space with a launch altitude of 100 miles (160 km). The flight plan called for the craft to separate from the launch vehicle, level out and glide above the Pacific at Mach 20. Contact was lost with the vehicle at nine minutes into the 30-minute mission, and the glider's skin disintegrated. In mid-November, DARPA stated that the first test flight ended when the computer autopilot "commanded flight termination" after the vehicle began to roll violently.

A second flight was initially scheduled to be launched on August 10, 2011, but bad weather forced a delay. The flight was launched the following day, on 11 August 2011. The unmanned Falcon HTV-2 successfully separated from the booster and entered the mission's glide phase, but again lost contact with control about nine minutes into its planned 30-minute Mach 20 glide flight. Initial reports indicated it purposely impacted the Pacific Ocean along its planned flight path as a safety precaution. The glider's surface reached 1,930 °C (3,500 °F) (the speed and heat caused part of the skin to peel away from the aerostructure) and controlled itself for 3 minutes before crashing.

== Future development ==
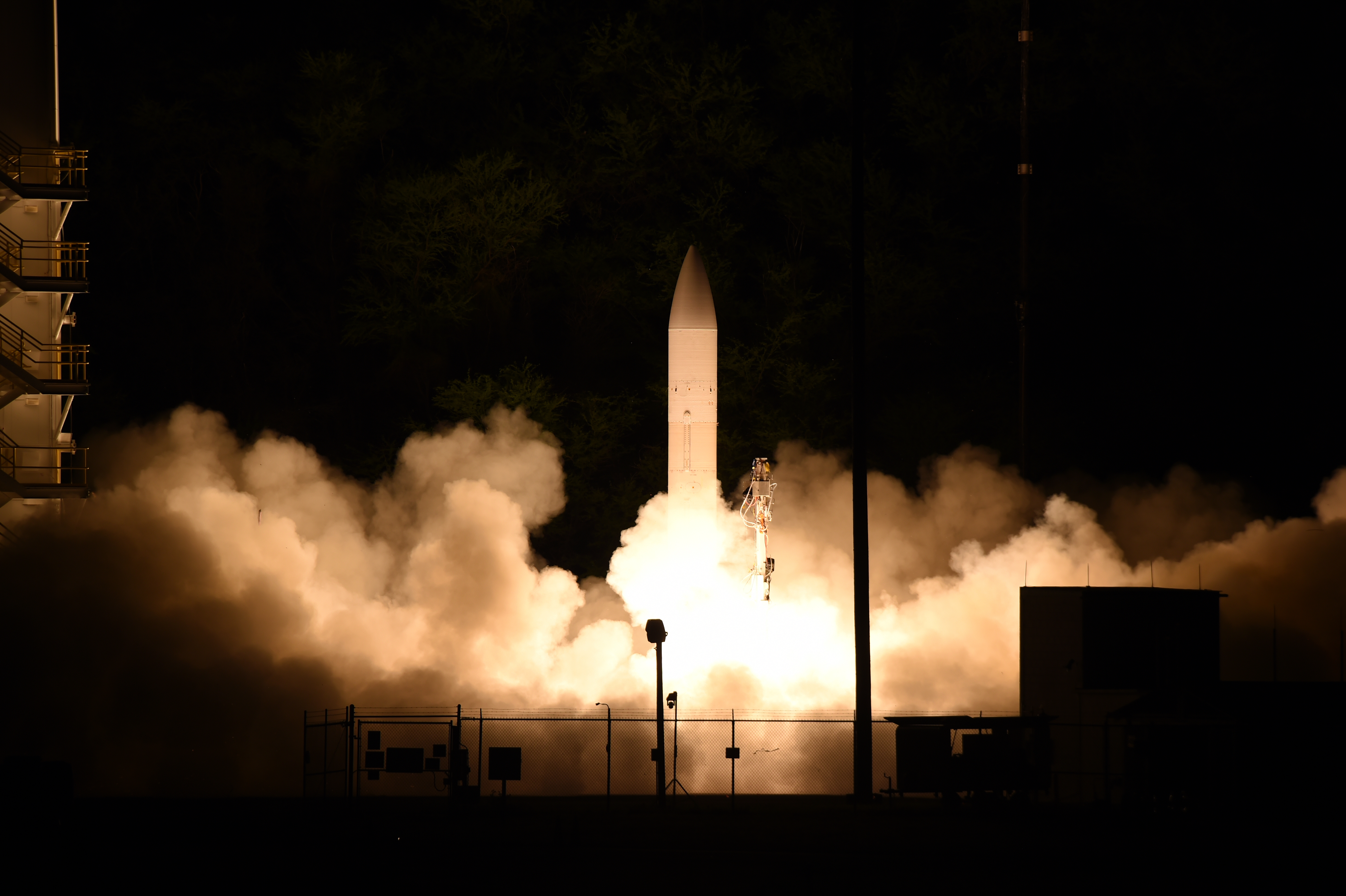
2020 Hawaii launch

DARPA does not plan to conduct a third flight test of the HTV-2. The decision was made because substantial data was collected from the first two flights, and a third was not thought likely to provide any additional valuable data for the cost. The first flight provided data in aerodynamics and flight performance, while the second provided information about structures and high temperatures. Experience gained from the HTV-2 will be used to improve hypersonic flight.

== See also ==
- DF-ZF – a similar Chinese system that is currently operational.
- Avangard – a similar Russian system that joined service in 2020.
- Boeing X-51 – scramjet-powered hypersonic cruise missile demonstrator
- Hypersonic Technology Demonstrator Vehicle – scramjet-powered hypersonic cruise missile demonstrator
