= DF-ZF =

Chinese experimental hypersonic glide vehicle

WU-14/DF-ZF
- Illustration of a DF-17 missile carrier carrying a DF-ZF glide vehicle

General information
- Type: Hypersonic glide vehicle
- National origin: People's Republic of China
- Status: Operational
- Primary user: People's Liberation Army Rocket Force

History
- Introduction date: 1 October 2019
- First flight: 9 January 2014

The DF-ZF is a hypersonic glide vehicle (HGV) developed by the People's Republic of China. It is launched by the DF-17 medium-range ballistic missile. The combined weapon system was likely operational by October 2019.

The United States once referred to the DF-ZF as the WU-14. The DF-17 was previously referred to as the DF-ZF.

== Development ==
According to Ye Youda, a scientist who worked on China's hypersonic weapon project, development was slowed by inadequate computing resources. The weapons project did not have priority access to supercomputers, or it was impractical to use available supercomputers due to their design.

Seven flight tests — with one failure — were conducted from 2014 through 2016; the launches were from the Taiyuan Satellite Launch Center in Shanxi Province, the People's Liberation Army's main long-range missile testing center.

The DF-ZF was likely operational by 1 October 2019, when it made its first official public appearance.

== Capabilities ==
The DF-ZF is thought to reach speeds between Mach 5 (3,836 mph (6,173 km/h; 1,715 m/s)) and Mach 10 (7,680 mph (12,360 km/h; 3,430 m/s)). The glider could be used for nuclear weapons delivery but could also be used to perform precision-strike conventional missions (for example, next-generation anti-ship ballistic missiles), which could penetrate "the layered air defenses of a U.S. carrier strike group."

Hypersonic glide vehicles are less susceptible to anti-ballistic missile countermeasures than conventional reentry vehicles (RVs). Conventional RVs descend through the atmosphere on a predictable ballistic trajectory. In contrast, a hypersonic glide vehicle such as the DF-ZF can pull-up after reentering the atmosphere and approach its target in a relatively flat glide, lessening the time it can be detected, fired at, or reengaged if an initial attack fails. Gliding makes it more maneuverable and extends its range. Although gliding creates more drag, it flies further than it would on a higher trajectory through space, and is too low to be intercepted by exo-atmospheric kill vehicles. The tradeoff is that warheads have less speed and altitude as they near the target, making them vulnerable to lower-tier interceptors, such as the Mach 17 Russian 53T6, ABM-3 Gazelle. Other potential counter-hypersonic interception measures may involve laser or railgun technologies, but such technologies are not currently available.

A vehicle like the DF-ZF could be fitted to various Chinese ballistic missiles, such as the DF-21 medium-range missile (extending range from 2,000 to 3,000 km (1,200 to 1,900 mi)), and the DF-31 intercontinental ballistic missiles (extending range from 8,000 to 12,000 km (5,000 to 7,500 mi)).

== Foreign responses ==
Since conventional interceptor missiles have difficulty against maneuvering targets traveling faster than Mach 5 (the DF-ZF reenters the atmosphere at Mach 10), a problem exacerbated by decreased detection times, the United States may place more importance on developing directed-energy weapons as a countermeasure. However, after decades of research and development, directed-energy weapons are still very much at the experimental stage and it remains to be seen if or when they will be deployed as practical, high-performance military weapons.

Despite the difficulties that HGVs pose for mid-course ABM interception by systems like SM-3 and GBI, HGVs have yet to overcome substantial obstacles in order to achieve the same success in the terminal phase. For one thing, HGVs can only maneuver drastically in the mid-course phase of their flight path due to extreme pressures during their terminal phase. Additionally, contemporary SAM systems like THAAD, PATRIOT and SM-6 are mostly optimized for terminal phase interception, with the exception of SM-3 and GBI. Furthermore, when HGVs re-enter the atmosphere at hypersonic velocities a plasma sheet will develop which disrupts their communications and sensors. These factors have likely contributed to DF-ZF currently being deployed for a land-attack role only, although an anti-ship variant is in development.

== See also ==
- Avangard – a Russian hypersonic glide vehicle
- Hypersonic Technology Vehicle 2 – a similar US test vehicle and warhead
- HYFLEX – a Japanese Hypersonic Flight Experiment
- Long-Range Hypersonic Weapon
- Rockwell X-30, 1990–1993 project for SSTO prototype
- Boeing X-51 Waverider
- IXV
- YJ-17, likely the anti-ship version of the DF-17.
