= List of Indian military missiles =

List of missiles of Indian Armed Forces

The Indian Armed Forces uses various types of ballistic and cruise missiles. In India, the Defence Research and Development Organisation is the major body that is involved in the research and development of missiles. Public sector units and some of the private organizations are involved in the manufacture of the missiles, often in collaboration with foreign manufacturers. India also procures missiles from foreign manufacturers and agencies.

== Anti-tank ==
Family	Name	Type	Designer	Guidance	Range	Speed	Warhead	Intr.	Status	Image	Ref.
9M113 Konkurs	9M113-M	Man-portable ATGM	(Soviet Union) Tula KBP	Wire-guided SACLOS	4 km (2.5 mi)	208 m/s	Tandem; HEAT; 2.7 kg	1991	In service		
9K114 Shturm		Land-attack ATGM	(Russia) KBM	Wire-guided SACLOS	5 km (3.1 mi)	345 m/s	HEAT; 5.3 kg	1999	In service		
9K121 Vikhr	Vikhr-AT	Air-launched ATGM	(Russia) KBP	Beam riding	12 km (7.5 mi)	610 m/s	Tandem; HEAT; 12 kg	2004	In service		
9M133 Kornet		Land-attack ATGM	(Russia) KBP	SACLOS beam riding	8 km (5.0 mi)	350 m/s	Tandem; HEAT; 4.6 kg	2006	In service		
AGM-114 Hellfire	Hellfire-2	Air-launched ATGM	(United States) Lockheed Martin	Laser guidance	1 km (0.62 mi)	Mach 1.3	Tandem; HEAT	2020	In service		
Spike	Spike-MR	Man-portable ATGM	(Israel) Rafael	Infrared homing	2.5 km (1.6 mi)		Tandem; HEAT	2023	In service		
Nag	Prospina	Land-attack ATGM	(India) DRDO	Charge-coupled device Infrared homing	4 km (2.5 mi)	230 m/s	Tandem; HEAT; 8 kg	2016	In service		
Nag	HeliNa/Dhruvastra	Air-launched ATGM	(India) DRDO	Charge-coupled device Infrared homing	10 km (6.2 mi)	230 m/s	Tandem; HEAT; 8 kg	TBD	In development		
Nag	Stand off Anti-Tank missile	Standoff Air-launched ATGM	(India) DRDO	Charge-coupled device Millimeter wave Active radar homing	20 km (12 mi)	230 m/s	Tandem; HEAT; 8 kg	TBD	In development		
Nag	MPATGM	Man-portable ATGM	(India) DRDO		2.5 km (1.6 mi)		Tandem; HEAT; 8 kg	TBD	In development		
DRDO Anti Tank Missile		ATGM	(India) DRDO	Wire guided	1.6 km (0.99 mi)	0.91 m/s	HEAT	TBD	In development		
Amogha missile	Amogha-1	ATGM	(India) Bharat Dynamics	Semi-automatic command to line of sight	2.8 km (1.7 mi)		HEAT	TBD	In development		
Amogha missile	Amogha-II	Air-launched ATGM	(India) Bharat Dynamics	Semi-automatic command to line of sight	2.8 km (1.7 mi)		HEAT	TBD	In development		
Amogha missile	Amogha-III	Man-portable ATGM	(India) Bharat Dynamics	Imaging infrared Electro-optical	2.5 km (1.6 mi)		HEAT	TBD	In development		
SAMHO		Cannon launched ATGM	(India) DRDO	Semi-active laser homing	5 km (3.1 mi)		Tandem; HEAT	TBD	In development		
ATGM 5		Man-portable ATGM	MBDA France	Infrared homing Television guidance	4 km (2.5 mi)		Tandem; HEAT	TBD	In development		

== Anti-ship ==
Family	Name	Type	Designer	Guidance	Range	Speed	Warhead	Intr.	Status	Image	Ref.
Sea Eagle		Short range AShM	(United Kingdom) BAe Dynamics	INS; Active radar homing	110 km (68 mi)	Mach 1	Conventional; 230 kg	1988	In service		
P-15 Termit	P-15M	Short range AShM	(Soviet Union) MKB Raduga	INS; Active radar homing	80 km (50 mi)	Mach 0.95	Hollow charge 454 kg	1989	In service		
APR-2		ASW torpedo	(Soviet Union) TMC	Acoustic homing	3 km (1.9 mi)	56 kn	High explosive 74 kg	1990	In service		
53-65		ASW torpedo	(Soviet Union) Ostekhbureau	Acoustic homing	18 km (11 mi)	45 kn	High explosive 307.6 kg	1990	In service		
SET-65		ASW torpedo	(Soviet Union) SI-400	Acoustic homing	100 km (62 mi)	50 kn	High explosive 557 kg	1991	In service		
SUT		ASW torpedo	(Germany) Atlas Elektronik	Acoustic homing	30 km (19 mi)	35 kn	High explosive 250 kg	1994	In service		
Kh-31	Kh-31A1	Short range AShM	(Russia) TMC	INS; Active radar homing	70 km (43 mi)	Mach 3.5	Armor piercing	2007	In service		
A244		ASW torpedo	(Italy) Leonardo	Acoustic homing	13.5 km (8.4 mi)	39 kn	High explosive 45.4 kg	2007	In service		
Kalibr	3M-54E	Cruise AShM	(Russia) NPO Novator	INS; Active radar homing	300 km (190 mi)	Mach 3	Conventional or Nuclear; 500 kg	2008	In service		
Kh-35		Cruise AShM	(Russia) TMC	INS; Active radar homing	300 km (190 mi)	Mach 0.85	High explosive Fragmented	2009	In service		
Harpoon	Block-2	Short range AShM	(United States) Boeing	INS; Active radar homing	124 km (77 mi)	Mach 0.71	Conventional; 221 kg	2013	In service		
Mk-54	Mk-54 LWT	ASW torpedo	(United States) Raytheon	Acoustic homing	0.45 km (0.28 mi)	40 kn	High explosive 43.9 kg	2016	In service		
Exocet	SM-39	Short range AShM	MBDA France	INS; Active radar homing	50 km (31 mi)	Mach 0.93	Conventional; 165 kg	2024	In service		
Naval Anti-ship Missile	NASM-SR	Short range AShM	(India) DRDO	INS with satellite guidance Imaging infrared	55 km (34 mi)	Mach 0.8	Conventional; 100 kg	TBD	In development		
Naval Anti-ship Missile	NASM-MR	Medium range AShM	(India) DRDO	INS with satellite guidance Imaging infrared	250 km (160 mi)	Mach 0.7	Conventional; 150 kg	TBD	In development		
Supersonic Missile Assisted Release of Torpedo (SMART)		Long-range ASM	(India) DRDO	Inertial navigation system Acoustic homing	643 km (400 mi)		Conventional; 50 kg	TBD	In development		
Long Range – Anti Ship Missile		Long-range AShM	(India) DRDO		1,500 km (930 mi)	Mach 8-10	Hypersonic glide vehicle	TBD	In development		

== Air-to-air ==
Family	Name	Type	Designer	Guidance	Range	Speed	Warhead	Intr.	Status	Image	Ref.
Super 530	Super 530D	Beyond visual range AAM	(France) Matra	Semi-active radar homing	40 km (25 mi)	Mach 4.5	High-explosive; Fragmented	1989	In service		
R-27	R-27R1	Beyond visual range AAM	(Soviet Union) Vympel NPO	Semi-active radar homing	75 km (47 mi)	Mach 2.5	Blast/fragmentation; Continuous rod 39 kg	1995	In service		
R-27	R-27T1	Beyond visual range AAM	(Soviet Union) Vympel NPO	Infrared homing	80 km (50 mi)	Mach 2.5	Blast/fragmentation; Continuous rod 39 kg	1995	In service		
R-27	R-27ER1	Beyond visual range AAM	(Soviet Union) Vympel NPO	Semi-active radar homing	100 km (62 mi)	Mach 2.5	Blast/fragmentation; Continuous rod 39 kg	1999	In service		
R-27	R-27ET1	Beyond visual range AAM	(Soviet Union) Vympel NPO	Infrared homing	80 km (50 mi)	Mach 2.5	Blast/fragmentation; Continuous rod 39 kg	1999	In service		
R-77		Beyond visual range AAM	(Russia) Vympel NPO	INS Active radar homing	110 km (68 mi)	Mach 4	High-explosive; Fragmented; 22.5kg	2002	In service		
KS-172		Beyond visual range AAM	(Russia) NPO Novator	INS Active radar homing	300 km (190 mi)	Mach 3.3	High-explosive; Fragmented	2007	In service		
Astra	Astra Mk1	Beyond visual range AAM	(India) DRDO	Fibre-optic gyro based INS; Active radar homing	110 km (68 mi)	Mach 4.5	High-explosive; Pre-fragmented; 15 kg	2018	In service		
Astra	Astra Mk2	Beyond visual range AAM	(India) DRDO	Fibre-optic gyro based INS; Active radar homing	160 km (99 mi)	Mach 4.5	High-explosive; Pre-fragmented; 15 kg	TBD	In development		
Astra	Astra Mk3	Beyond visual range AAM	(India) DRDO	Fibre-optic gyro based INS; Active radar homing	350 km (220 mi)	Mach 4.5	High-explosive; Pre-fragmented; 15 kg	TBD	In development		
Python	Python-5	Beyond visual range AAM	(Israel) Rafael	Infrared homing	20 km (12 mi)	Mach 4	Proximity; 11 kg	2018	In service		
Python	Derby	Beyond visual range AAM	(Israel) Rafael	Active radar homing	50 km (31 mi)	Mach 4	Proximity; 23 kg	2018	In service		
MICA		Beyond visual range AAM	MBDA France	INS Active radar homing	60 km (37 mi)	Mach 4	12 kg	2021	In service		
Meteor		Beyond visual range AAM	(European Union) MBDA	INS Active radar homing	200 km (120 mi)	Mach 4	High-explosive; Fragmented	2022	In service		
ASRAAM		Beyond visual range AAM	(United Kingdom) MBDA UK	INS Infrared homing	25 km (16 mi)	Mach 3+	High-explosive; Fragmented; 88 kg	2024	In service		
Solid Fuel Ducted Ramjet		Beyond visual range AAM	(India) DRDO		350 km (220 mi)	Mach 4.5		TBD	In development		
R-73		Short range AAM	(Soviet Union) Vympel NPO	Infrared homing	30 km (19 mi)	Mach 2.5	High-explosive; Fragmented; 7.4 kg	1989	In service		
R-60		Short range AAM	(Soviet Union) Vympel NPO	Infrared homing	8 km (5.0 mi)	Mach 2.5	High-explosive; Fragmented; 3 kg	1990	In service		
R.550 Magic		Short range AAM	(France) Matra	Infrared homing	20 km (12 mi)	Mach 3	High-explosive; Fragmented; 12.7 kg	1994	In service		
Python	Python-4	Short range AAM	(Israel) Rafael	Infrared homing	15 km (9.3 mi)	Mach 3.5	High-explosive; Fragmented; 11 kg	2007	In service		

== Air-to-surface ==
Family	Name	Type	Designer	Guidance	Range	Speed	Warhead	Intr.	Status	Image	Ref.
ULPGM	V1	ASM	(India) DRDO	IIR homing	2 km (1.2 mi)	N/A	2 kg (4.4 lb)		In service		
ULPGM	V2	ASM	(India) DRDO	two-way datalink EO sensor	6 km (3.7 mi)	N/A	N/A		In service		
ULPGM	ULM-ER	ASM	(India) DRDO	Multiple	10 km (6.2 mi)	N/A	N/A		In development		
Kh-59 Ovod	Kh-59ME	ASM	(Russia) MKB Raduga	INS Active radar homing	200 km (120 mi)	Mach 0.88	Conventional; Pre-fragmented	2002	In service		
Popeye		ASM	(Israel) Rafael	INS; Infrared homing	78 km (48 mi)		Conventional; Pre-fragmented; 340 kg	2006	In service		
BrahMos	BrahMos A	Supersonic ALCM	(Russia) NPO Mashinostroyeniya (India) DRDO	INS + Sat Nav; Active radar homing	450 km (280 mi)	Mach 3	Conventional or Nuclear; Armour-piercing; 300 kg	2019	In service		
SCALP-EG		ASM	(European Union) MBDA	INS, GPS, TERPROM	550 km (340 mi)	Mach 0.95	BROACH; 550 kg	2022	In service		
AASM Hammer		ASM	(France) Safran	INS, GPS	70 km (43 mi)		General-purpose bomb 250 kg	2023	In service		
Rudram	Rudram-1	Air to surface ARM	(India) DRDO	INS Active radar homing	150 km (93 mi)	Mach 2	Conventional; Pre-fragmented; 55 kg	TBD	In development		
Rudram	Rudram-2	Air to surface ARM	(India) DRDO	INS SatNav; IIR homing	350 km (220 mi)	Mach 5.5	Conventional; Pre-fragmented; 155 kg / Bunker buster	TBD	In development		
Rudram	Rudram-3	Air to surface ARM	(India) DRDO		550 km (340 mi)		Bunker buster	TBD	In development		

== Surface-to-air ==
Family	Name	Type	Designer	Guidance	Range	Alitude	Speed	Warhead	Intr.	Status	Image	Ref.
Trishul		Short range SAM	(India) DRDO	Command to line-of-sight	11 km (6.8 mi)		Mach 2	High-explosive; Pre-fragmented; 15 kg	1983	In service		
S-125 Neva/Pechora	V601	Short range SAM	(Soviet Union) JSC Defense Systems	Command to line-of-sight	35 km (22 mi)	18 km (11 mi)	Mach 3	High-explosive; Pre-fragmented; 60 kg	1987	In service		
Seacat		Short range SAM	(United Kingdom) Short Brothers	Command to line-of-sight	5 km (3.1 mi)		Mach 0.8	Continuous rod	1987	In service		
9K33 Osa	9M33	Short range SAM	(Soviet Union) Znamya Truda Plant	Command to line-of-sight	15 km (9.3 mi)	12 km (7.5 mi)	Mach 2.9	High-explosive; Pre-fragmented; 15 kg	1990	In service		
9K35 Strela-10	9M37	Short range SAM	(Soviet Union) KB Tochmash	Command to line-of-sight	5 km (3.1 mi)	3.5 km (2.2 mi)	Mach 0.5	High-explosive; Pre-fragmented; 5 kg	1990	In service		
2K22 Tunguska	9M311	Short range SAM	(Russia) KBP	Command to line-of-sight	9 km (5.6 mi)	3.5 km (2.2 mi)	Mach 1	Continuous rod 9 kg	1999	In service		
Buk	9M38	Short range SAM	(Russia) Almaz-Antey	Command to line-of-sight	30 km (19 mi)	20 km (12 mi)	Mach 3	High-explosive; Pre-fragmented	2001	In service		
Buk	9M317	Short range SAM	(Russia) Almaz-Antey	Command to line-of-sight	50 km (31 mi)	25 km (16 mi)	Mach 4	High-explosive; Pre-fragmented; 62 kg	2013	In service		
Barak 1		Short range SAM	(Israel) IAI (Israel) Rafael	Command to line-of-sight	12 km (7.5 mi)	5.5 km (3.4 mi)	Mach 2.1	High-explosive; Pre-fragmented; 22 kg	2004	In service		
Akash	Akash Mk I	Medium range SAM	(India) DRDO	Command guidance Active radar homing	30 km (19 mi)	18 km (11 mi)	Mach 3	High-explosive; Pre-fragmented; 60 kg	2009	In service		
Akash	Akash Mk II	Medium range SAM	(India) DRDO	Command guidance Active radar homing	40 km (25 mi)	20 km (12 mi)	Mach 3	High-explosive; Pre-fragmented; 60 kg	TBD	In development		
Akash	Akash-NG	Medium range SAM	(India) DRDO	Command guidance Active radar homing	70 km (43 mi)	20 km (12 mi)	Mach 3	High-explosive; Pre-fragmented; 60 kg	TBD	In development		
Barak 8	MR-SAM	Medium range SAM	| (Israel) IAI (India) DRDO	INS; Active radar homing	70 km (43 mi)	16 km (9.9 mi)	Mach 2	Kinetic kill vehicle 60 kg	2020	In service		
Barak 8	LR-SAM	Long range SAM	| (Israel) IAI (India) DRDO	INS; Active radar homing	100 km (62 mi)	20 km (12 mi)	Mach 3+	Kinetic kill vehicle 60 kg	2019	In service		
Barak 8	ER-SAM	Extended range SAM	| (Israel) IAI (India) DRDO	INS; Active radar homing	150 km (93 mi)	30 km (19 mi)	Mach 3+	Kinetic kill vehicle 60 kg		In service		
QRSAM		Quick reaction SAM	(India) DRDO	INS with Datalink; Active radar homing	30 km (19 mi)	14 km (8.7 mi)	Mach 4.7	High-explosive; Pre-fragmented; 32 kg	2022	In service		
VL-SRSAM		Short range SAM	(India) DRDO	Fibre-optic gyro based INS; Active radar homing	50 km (31 mi)	16 km (9.9 mi)	Mach 4.5	High-explosive; Pre-fragmented	2022	In service		
SAMAR	SAMAR I	Short range SAM	(India) DRDO	Infrared homing	12 km (7.5 mi)		Mach 2.5	High-explosive; Pre-fragmented	2024	In service		
SAMAR	SAMAR II	Short range SAM	(India) DRDO	Semi-active radar homing	20 km (12 mi)		Mach 2.5	High-explosive; Pre-fragmented	TBD	In development		
S-400		Mobile long-range SAM	(Russia) Almaz-Antey	Semi-active radar homing	380 km (240 mi)	40 km (25 mi)	Mach 14	High-explosive; Pre-fragmented	2021	In service		
9K38 Igla	Igla-1	Man-portable SAM	(Russia) NPO Mashinostroyeniya	Infrared homing	5 km (3.1 mi)	3.5 km (2.2 mi)	Mach 1.7-1.8	High-explosive; Pre-fragmented; 1.17 kg	1991	In service		
9K38 Igla	Igla	Man-portable SAM	(Russia) NPO Mashinostroyeniya	Infrared homing	5.2 km (3.2 mi)	3.5 km (2.2 mi)	Mach 1.7-1.8	High-explosive; Pre-fragmented; 1.17 kg	2003	In service		
9K38 Igla	Igla-S	Man-portable SAM	(Russia) NPO Mashinostroyeniya	Infrared homing	6 km (3.7 mi)	3.5 km (2.2 mi)	Mach 1.7-1.8	High-explosive; Pre-fragmented; 2.5 kg	2012	In service		
9K34 Strela-3		Man-portable SAM	(Soviet Union) KBM	Infrared homing	4.5 km (2.8 mi)	3 km (1.9 mi)	Mach 1.5	High-explosive; Pre-fragmented; 1.15 kg	1985	In service		
9K32 Strela-2		Man-portable SAM	(Soviet Union) KBM	Infrared homing	4.3 km (2.7 mi)	2.3 km (1.4 mi)	Mach 1.5	High-explosive; Pre-fragmented; 1.15 kg	1996	In service		
FIM-92 Stinger		Man-portable SAM	(United States) Raytheon	Infrared homing	8 km (5.0 mi)		Mach 2.2	High-explosive; Pre-fragmented; 3 kg	2020	In service		
Kusha	MR-SAM	Medium range SAM	(India) DRDO		150 km (93 mi)			High-explosive; Pre-fragmented	TBD	In development		
Kusha	ER-SAM	Long range SAM	(India) DRDO		250 km (160 mi)			High-explosive; Pre-fragmented	TBD	In development		
Kusha	XR-SAM	Extended range SAM	(India) DRDO		350 km (220 mi)			High-explosive; Pre-fragmented	TBD	In development		
VSHORAD		Short range/ Man-portable SAM	(India) DRDO	Infrared homing	6 km (3.7 mi)	3.5 km (2.2 mi)	Mach 1.5	High-explosive; Pre-fragmented; 2 kg	TBD	In development		

== Surface-to-surface ==
Family	Name	Type	Designer	Guidance	Range	Speed	Warhead	Intr.	Status	Image	Ref.
Prithvi	Prithvi-I	Surface-to-surface; TBM	(India) DRDO	Inertial navigation system	150 km (93 mi)		Conventional or Nuclear; Fragmentation; Thermobaric	1994	In service		
Prithvi	Prithvi-II	Surface-to-surface SRBM	(India) DRDO	Inertial navigation system	350 km (220 mi)		Conventional or Nuclear; Fragmentation; Thermobaric	2003	In service		
Prithvi	Prithvi-III	Surface-to-surface SRBM	(India) DRDO	Inertial navigation system	600 km (370 mi)		Conventional or Nuclear; Fragmentation; Thermobaric	2004	In service		
Prithvi	Dhanush	Surface-to-surface ASBM	(India) DRDO	Inertial navigation system	750 km (470 mi)		Conventional or Nuclear; Fragmentation; Thermobaric	2018	In service		
Agni	Agni-I	Surface-to-surface MRBM	(India) DRDO	Ring laser gyro INS infrared homing active radar homing	1,200 km (750 mi)	Mach 24	Conventional or Nuclear; High explosive Cluster munition Incendiary; Thermobaric	2002	In service		
Agni	Agni-P	Surface-to-surface MRBM	(India) DRDO	Ring laser gyro INS infrared homing active radar homing	2,000 km (1,200 mi)	Mach 24	Conventional or Nuclear; High explosive Cluster munition Incendiary; Thermobaric	2021	In development		
Agni	Agni-II	Surface-to-surface MRBM	(India) DRDO	Ring laser gyro INS infrared homing active radar homing	3,500 km (2,200 mi)	Mach 24	Conventional or Nuclear; High explosive Cluster munition Incendiary; Thermobaric	2010	In service		
Agni	Agni-III	Surface-to-surface IRBM	(India) DRDO	Ring laser gyro INS infrared homing active radar homing	5,000 km (3,100 mi)	Mach 24	Conventional or Nuclear; High explosive Cluster munition Incendiary; Thermobaric	2011	In service		
Agni	Agni-IV	Surface-to-surface IRBM	(India) DRDO	Ring laser gyro INS infrared homing active radar homing	4,000 km (2,500 mi)	Mach 24	Conventional or Nuclear; High explosive Cluster munition Incendiary; Thermobaric	2014	In service		
Agni	Agni-V	Surface-to-surface ICBM	(India) DRDO	Ring laser gyro INS infrared homing active radar homing	8,000 km (5,000 mi)	Mach 24	Conventional or Nuclear; High explosive Cluster munition Incendiary; Thermobaric	2018	In service		
Agni	Agni-VI	Surface-to-surface ICBM	(India) DRDO	Ring laser gyro INS infrared homing active radar homing	16,000 km (9,900 mi)	Mach 24	Conventional or Nuclear; High explosive Cluster munition Incendiary; Thermobaric	TBD	In development		
BrahMos	BrahMos Block I	Supersonic ship launched AshM/LAM	(Russia) NPO Mashinostroyeniya (India) DRDO	INS + Sat Nav; Active radar homing	290 km (180 mi)	Mach 3	Conventional or Nuclear; Armour-piercing; 300 kg	2007	In service		
BrahMos	BrahMos Block I	Supersonic land launched AshM/LAM	(Russia) NPO Mashinostroyeniya (India) DRDO	INS + Sat Nav; Active radar homing	290 km (180 mi)	Mach 3	Conventional or Nuclear; Armour-piercing; 300 kg	2010	In service		
BrahMos	BrahMos Block II	Supersonic land launched LAM	(Russia) NPO Mashinostroyeniya (India) DRDO	INS + Sat Nav; Active radar homing	290 km (180 mi)	Mach 3	Conventional or Nuclear; Armour-piercing; 300 kg	2012	In service		
BrahMos	BrahMos Block III	Supersonic land launched LAM	(Russia) NPO Mashinostroyeniya (India) DRDO	INS + Sat Nav; Active radar homing	290 km (180 mi)	Mach 3	Conventional or Nuclear; Armour-piercing; 300 kg	2013	In service		
BrahMos	Submarine launched BrahMos	Supersonic submarine launched AshM/LAM	(Russia) NPO Mashinostroyeniya (India) DRDO	INS + Sat Nav; Active radar homing	290 km (180 mi)	Mach 3	Conventional or Nuclear; Armour-piercing; 300 kg	2013	In service		
BrahMos	BrahMos ER	Multi-platform multirole Supersonic CM	(Russia) NPO Mashinostroyeniya (India) DRDO	INS + Sat Nav; Active radar homing	800 km (500 mi)	Mach 3	Conventional or Nuclear; Armour-piercing; 300 kg	2022	In service		
BrahMos	BrahMos NG	Multi-platform multirole Supersonic CM	(Russia) NPO Mashinostroyeniya (India) DRDO	INS + Sat Nav; Active radar homing	290 km (180 mi)	Mach 3	Conventional or Nuclear; Armour-piercing; 300 kg	TBD	In development		
BrahMos	BrahMos-II	Hypersonic CM	(Russia) NPO Mashinostroyeniya (India) DRDO	INS + Sat Nav; Active radar homing	1,000 km (620 mi)	Mach 8	Conventional or Nuclear; Armour-piercing; 300 kg	TBD	In development		
Kalibr	3M-54E Klub	Surface-to-surface cruise missile	(Russia) NPO Novator	INS; Active radar homing	300 km (190 mi)	Mach 3	Conventional or Nuclear; 500 kg	2009	In service		
K missile family	K-15 (Sagarika)	Short range SLBM	(India) DRDO	Ring laser gyro INS; Accelerometer	750 km (470 mi)	Mach 7.5	Conventional or Nuclear	2018	In service		
K missile family	K-4	Medium range SLBM	(India) DRDO	Ring laser gyro INS; Accelerometer	3,500 km (2,200 mi)	Mach 7.5	Conventional or Nuclear		In service		
K missile family	K-5	Intermediate range SLBM	(India) DRDO	Ring laser gyro INS; Accelerometer	5,000 km (3,100 mi)	Mach 7.5	Conventional or Nuclear	TBD	In development		
K missile family	K-6	IC SLBM	(India) DRDO	Ring laser gyro INS; Accelerometer	8,000 km (5,000 mi)	Mach 7.5	Conventional or Nuclear	TBD	In development		
Nirbhay	Nirbhay LAM	Subsonic LAM	(India) DRDO	Ring laser gyro INS + GPS/NavIC; Active radar homing Imaging infrared	1,500 km (930 mi)	Mach 0.9	Conventional or Nuclear; Fragmentation	2019	In service		
Nirbhay	LR-LACM	Subsonic LAM	(India) DRDO		1,500 km (930 mi)	Mach 0.9	Conventional or Nuclear; Fragmentation	TBD	In development		
Nirbhay	SLCM	Subsonic SLCM	(India) DRDO		500 km (310 mi)	Mach 0.8	Conventional or Nuclear; Fragmentation	TBD	In development		
Shaurya		Surface-to-surface MRBM	(India) DRDO	Ring laser gyro INS; Accelerometer	1,900 km (1,200 mi)	Mach 7.5	Conventional or Nuclear	TBD	In deployment		
Prahaar	Prahaar	Surface-to-surface TBM	(India) DRDO	Fibre-optic gyro INS GPS/NavIC; Active radar homing	150 km (93 mi)	Mach 4	Conventional or Nuclear; High explosive Cluster munition	TBD	In development		
Prahaar	Pragati	Surface-to-surface TBM	(India) DRDO	Fibre-optic gyro INS GPS/NavIC; Active radar homing	170 km (110 mi)	Mach 4	Conventional or Nuclear; High explosive Cluster munition	TBD	In development		
Prahaar	Pranash	Surface-to-surface TBM	(India) DRDO	Fibre-optic gyro INS GPS/NavIC; Active radar homing	200 km (120 mi)	Mach 4	Conventional or Nuclear; High explosive Cluster munition	TBD	In development		
Pralay		Surface-to-surface SRBM	(India) DRDO	Inertial navigation system	500 km (310 mi)	Mach 6.1	Conventional; High explosive Fragmentation	TBD	In service		
ET-LDHCM		Hypersonic CM	(India) DRDO		>1,500 kilometres (930 mi)	>Mach 8	Conventional or Nuclear	TBD	In development		
Dhvani		Hypersonic Glide Vehicle	(India) DRDO		6,000 to 10,000 kilometers	>Mach 6	Conventional or Nuclear	TBD	In development		
Surya		Surface-to-surface ICBM			16,000 km (9,900 mi)	Mach 27	Conventional or Nuclear; MITRV	Unknown	Unconfirmed		

== Anti-satellite ==
Family	Name	Type	Design	Guidance	Range	Warhead	Intr.	Status	Image	Ref.
Prithvi Defence Vehicle	Mark I/Mark II	Exoatmospheric; ABM	(India) DRDO	Ring laser gyro based inertial navigation system Imaging infrared homing	5,000 km (3,100 mi)	Kinetic kill vehicle	TBD	In development		

== Guided bombs ==
Family	Name	Type	Designer	Guidance	Warhead	Intr.	Status	Image	Ref.
Paveway	Paveway-III	Guided bomb	(United States) Texas Instruments	Beam riding	907 kg	1994	In service		
BGL		Guided bomb	(France) Matra	Beam riding		1995	In service		
Griffin LGB		Guided bomb	(Israel) IAI	Beam riding		2006	In service		
KAB-500	KAB-500L	Guided bomb	(Russia) TMC	Beam riding	450 kg	2007	In service		
Spice	Spice 2000	Guided bomb	(Israel) Rafael	Beam riding	113 kg	2009	In service		
Sudarshan		Guided bomb	(India) DRDO	Beam riding	450 kg	2013	In service		
CBU	SBU-97	Guided bomb	(United States) Textron	Beam riding	450 kg	2017	In service		
Krasnopol		Guided shell	(Russia) KBP	Beam riding	50 kg	2001	In service		
M982 Excalibur		Guided shell	(United States) ARL (United States) AARDE	Beam riding	5.4 kg	2020	In service		

== Missile defence ==
Family	Name	Type	Designer	Guidance	Range	Altitude	Speed	Warhead	Intr.	Status	Image	Ref.
Indian Ballistic Missile Defence Programme; Phase I	Pradyumna	Exoatmospheric ABM	(India) DRDO	Inertial navigation system Active radar homing	2,000 km (1,200 mi)	80 km (50 mi)	Mach 5+	Pre-fragmented; Kinetic kill vehicle 40 kg	2006	In service		
Indian Ballistic Missile Defence Programme; Phase I	Advanced Air Defence	Endoatmospheric ABM	(India) DRDO	Inertial navigation system Active radar homing	150 km (93 mi)	40 km (25 mi)	Mach 4.5	Pre-fragmented; Kinetic kill vehicle 40 kg	2007	In service		
Indian Ballistic Missile Defence Programme; Phase I	Prithvi Defence Vehicle	Exoatmospheric ABM	(India) DRDO	Ring laser gyro based INS; Infrared homing	5,000 km (3,100 mi)	180 km (110 mi)		Pre-fragmented; Kinetic kill vehicle	2019	In service		
Indian Ballistic Missile Defence Programme Phase II	Prithvi Defence Vehicle Mark-II	Exoatmospheric ABM	(India) DRDO	Ring laser gyro based INS; Infrared homing	5,000 km (3,100 mi)	1,200 km (750 mi)	Mach 5+	Pre-fragmented; Kinetic kill vehicle	TBD	In development		
Indian Ballistic Missile Defence Programme Phase II	AD-1	Endoatmospheric ABM	(India) DRDO	Ring laser gyro based INS; Infrared homing	5,000 km (3,100 mi)	TBA	Mach 5+	Pre-fragmented; Kinetic kill vehicle	TBD	In development		
Indian Ballistic Missile Defence Programme Phase II	AD-2	Exoatmospheric ABM	(India) DRDO	Ring laser gyro based INS; Infrared homing	5,000 km (3,100 mi)	TBA	Mach 5+	Pre-fragmented; Kinetic kill vehicle	TBD	In development		

== Multiple rocket ==
Family	Name	Type	Designer	Guidance	Range	Altitude	Speed	Warhead	Intr.	Status	Image	Ref.
Pinaka	Pinaka Mk I	Multiple rocket launcher	(India) DRDO	Ring laser gyro based INS with GPS/NavIC	37.5 km (23.3 mi)	40 km (25 mi)	Mach 4	High explosive, pre-fragmentated, cluster, anti-tank 250 kg	1998	In service		
Pinaka	Pinaka Mk IE	Multiple rocket launcher	(India) DRDO	Ring laser gyro based INS with GPS/NavIC	45 km (28 mi)	40 km (25 mi)	Mach 4	High explosive, pre-fragmentated, cluster, anti-tank 250 kg		In service		
Pinaka	Pinaka Mk II	Multiple rocket launcher	(India) DRDO	Ring laser gyro based INS with GPS/NavIC	60 km (37 mi)	40 km (25 mi)	Mach 4	High explosive, pre-fragmentated, cluster, anti-tank 250 kg	TBD	In trials		
Pinaka	Guided Pinaka	Multiple rocket launcher	(India) DRDO	Ring laser gyro based INS with GPS/NavIC	75 km (47 mi)	40 km (25 mi)	Mach 4	High explosive, pre-fragmentated, cluster, anti-tank 250 kg	TBD	In trials		
Pinaka	Pinaka ERR 122	Multiple rocket launcher	(India) DRDO	Ring laser gyro based INS with GPS/NavIC	60 km (37 mi)	40 km (25 mi)	Mach 4	High explosive, pre-fragmentated, cluster, anti-tank 250 kg	TBD	In development		
Pinaka	Pinaka Mk II ER	Multiple rocket launcher	(India) DRDO	Ring laser gyro based INS with GPS/NavIC	90 km (56 mi)	40 km (25 mi)	Mach 4	High explosive, pre-fragmentated, cluster, anti-tank 250 kg	TBD	In development		
Pinaka	Pinaka Mk III	Multiple rocket launcher	(India) DRDO	Ring laser gyro based INS with GPS/NavIC	120 km (75 mi)	40 km (25 mi)	Mach 4	High explosive, pre-fragmentated, cluster, anti-tank 250 kg	TBD	In development		

== Technology demonstrators ==
Name	Type	Designer	Guidance	Range	Speed	Warhead	Intr.	Status	Image	Ref.
Hypersonic Technology Demonstrator Vehicle	Hypersonic test bed	(India) DRDO			Mach 12		2019	In testing		

== See also ==
- List of active Indian military aircraft
- List of Indian military radars
