= Dhvani (hypersonic glide vehicle) =

Indian winged hypersonic glide vehicle

Dhvani HGV
- Type: Hypersonic glide vehicle
- Place of origin: India

Service history
- In service: Under Development
- Used by: Integrated Rocket Force, Indian Armed Forces (intended)

Production history
- Designer: DRDO
- Developed from: HSTDV

Specifications
- Length: 9 metres (30 ft)
- Diameter: 2.5 metres (8.2 ft)
- Warhead: Conventional or nuclear
- Operational range: >6,000 kilometres (3,700 mi)
- Maximum speed: >Mach 6

Dhvani (Sanskrit: ध्वनि; lit. Sound) is an winged Indian hypersonic glide vehicle under development by DRDO. The system is to consist of an MaRV-type ballistic warhead, developed from the Agni missile family. The weapon will follow a boost-glide trajectory with an estimated range of 6,000- 10,000 kilometers. It is a derivative of the HSTDV experiment. The missile is being developed by Aeronautical Research and Development Centre and the Defence Metallurgical Research Laboratory under DRDO. The missile is to use heat-resistant ceramics and coatings that can withstand high temperatures.The missile would be used for long-range strategic and deep-penetration attacks.

== See also ==
- LRAShM – Indian long range anti-ship hypersonic missile
- ET-LDHCM – Hypersonic cruise missile
- BM-04 – Medium-range conventional hypersonic ballistic missile
- BrahMos-II – Joint Russian-Indian hypersonic cruise missile
- Avangard (hypersonic glide vehicle) – Russian missile
- List of Indian military missiles
