= LRAShM (missile) =

Indian long range anti-ship hypersonic missile

Long Range – Anti Ship Missile (LRAShM)
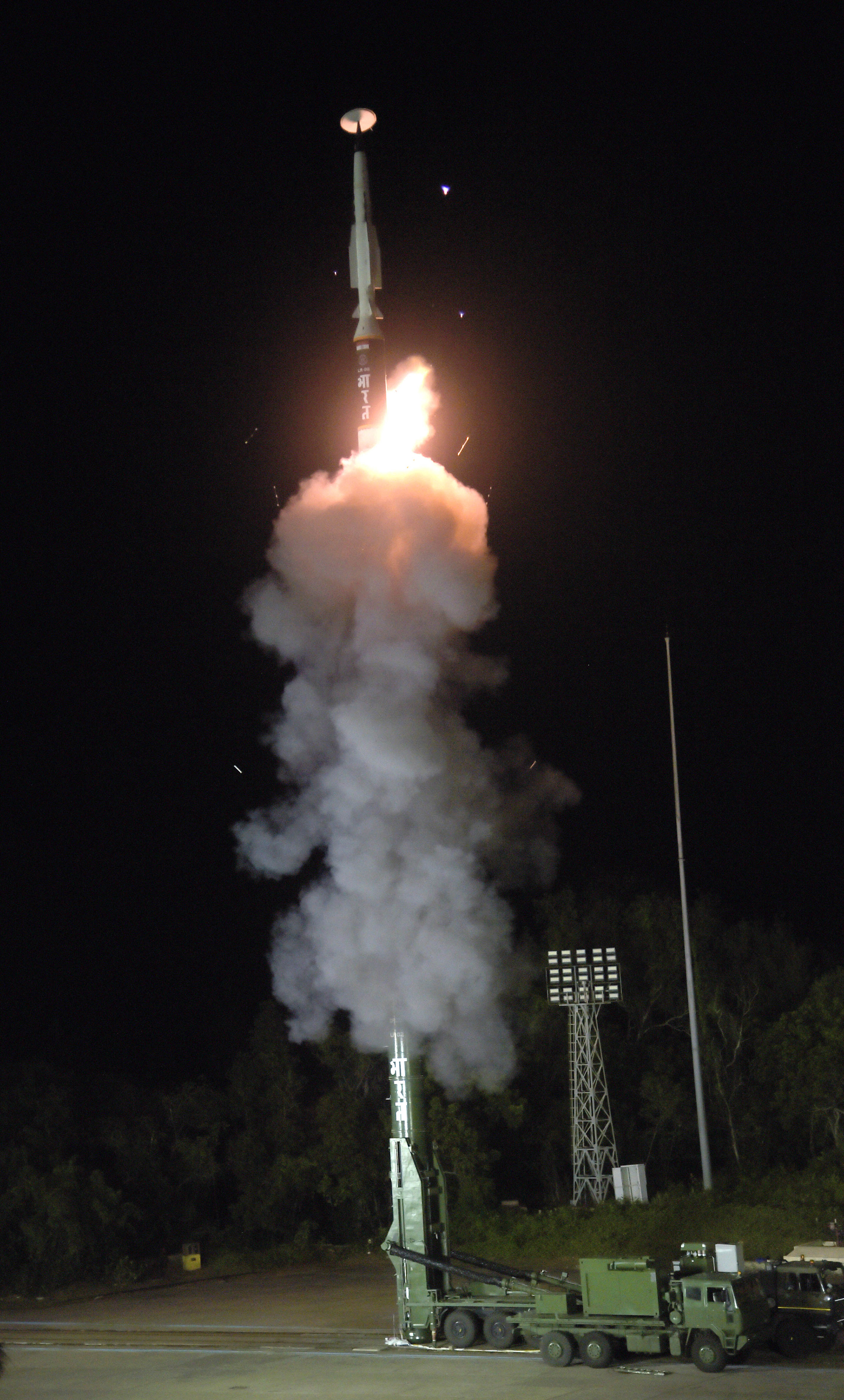
- The LRAShM missile during the second test launch in November 2024
- Type: Hypersonic glide vehicle Anti-ship missile
- Place of origin: India

Service history
- In service: Limited production
- Used by: Indian Navy (intended); Integrated Rocket Force

Production history
- Designer: Advanced Systems Laboratory
- Manufacturer: Bharat Dynamics Limited

Specifications
- Mass: 12 tonnes (26,000 lb)
- Length: 13 metres (43 ft)
- Diameter: 1.4 metres (4 ft 7 in)
- Warhead: Conventional, multiple configurations
- Engine: Two-stage rocket motor
- Propellant: Solid fuel
- Operational range: >1,500 kilometres (930 mi)
- Maximum speed: Mach 10
- Guidance system: Mid-course: INS + multi-GNSS; Terminal: ARH
- Launch platform: Truck-based Transporter Erector Launcher (TEL)

The Long Range – Anti Ship Missile (LRAShM) is a boost-glide hypersonic missile being developed by the Defence Research and Development Organisation for the Indian Navy. The missile can be fired from a shore-based transporter erector launcher (TEL) and is currently undergoing developmental trials. It is the first hypersonic weapon platform that has been developed and deployed by the Indian Armed Forces, with a stated objectives of coastal defence and long-range maritime strike roles with the Indian Navy.

== Background ==
Former President of India and head of the DRDO, Dr A. P. J. Abdul Kalam, stated at the Defence Research and Development Organisation Directors Conference on February 21, 2007, that India would require a modern defence system involving hypersonic weaponry, which he proposed to be developed by the nation in a span of fifteen years. Two missiles were introduced to meet these operational needs, with there development being publicly announced at 2023 Year End Review of the Ministry of Defence as the Long Range – Anti Ship Missile and BM-04 respectively.

Official work on a hypersonic vehicle propelled by scramjet engine started on a small scale in early 2008 with conceptual studies and design. Large-scale testing and system engineering was done in a phased manner instead of all-up testing as on India's other strategic platforms due to low levels of funding. During the development process, DRDO made notable advancements in the field of computational fluid dynamics, which are essential for building hypersonic vehicles. By 2015, the development of a conventionally armed missile with a range of more than 1,500 km (930 mi) was deemed necessary by the Indian Armed Forces in order to counter ship-based threats in the Indian Ocean, Bay of Bengal, and Arabian Sea, as well as land-based threats from China, beyond the Line of Actual Control (LAC) in the provinces of Xinjiang, Tibet, and Yunnan. Therefore, Advanced Systems Laboratory began full-scale work on the project from 2017. A preliminary flight test of HSTDV in 2020 validated aerodynamic configuration of vehicle, ignition and sustained combustion of scramjet engine at hypersonic flow, separation mechanisms and characterised thermo-structural materials.

The Defence Research and Development Laboratory requested funding from the Indian Government to build a Hypersonic Wind Tunnel to aid in design and development of future hypersonic missiles. The facility was initially put into service in October 2019. On 19 December 2020, Indian Defence Minister Rajnath Singh formally inaugurated the fully built Hypersonic Wind Tunnel (HWT) test facility at the Dr. A. P. J. Abdul Kalam Missile Complex. With a nozzle exit diameter of one meter and the ability to replicate speeds between Mach 5 to 12, the HWT facility is an enclosed free jet facility powered by pressure and vacuum. It was built at a cost of ₹400 crore (equivalent to ₹514 crore or US$53 million in 2026). Following China's two hypersonic weapons tests in the summer of 2021, Defence Minister Rajnath Singh stressed the need for hypersonic weapon development during a lecture held at DRDO on December 14, 2021. India has since then built 12 hypersonic wind tunnels that can test speeds of up to Mach 13, according to the October 2021 Congressional Research Service Report.

In February 2024, IIT Kanpur built and evaluated the Hypervelocity Expansion Tunnel Test Facility, referred to as S2, in the Department of Aerospace Engineering's Hypersonic Experimental Aerodynamics Laboratory (HEAL). The S2 facility can simulate flight speeds between Mach 8 to 29 and aid in the development of ballistic missiles, ramjet and, scramjet engines. It is anticipated that the facility will support multiple projects, ranging from spaceflight applications under ISRO's Gaganyaan and RLV-TD programmes, and DRDO's Hypersonic Technology Demonstrator Vehicle, ET-LDHCM and LR-AShM.

== Development ==
The LRAShM missile is being developed at the Dr. A. P. J. Abdul Kalam Missile Complex in Hyderabad with other DRDO laboratories and industry partners. The Vehicle Research and Development Establishment assigned the responsibility for developing the dummy article to simulate load and force on the vehicle during trials to Sterling Techno-Systems, a private sector business based in Pune. The aerodynamic characterization research was conducted at the 1.2m Trisonic Wind Tunnel Facility of the National Aerospace Laboratories. The programme is being led by Project Director A Prasad Goud. By 2 February 2026, two developmental trials were completed with the third expected to be conducted soon. The initial variant of the missile was showcased publicly for the first time at the Delhi Republic Day parade in 2026. In April, DRDO Chairman Samir V Kamat indicated that the missile has reached an advanced stage of development, and more development flight trails were to occur later.

Three further hypersonic weapon projects are underway with the DRDO. These include Project Vishnu, a hypersonic cruise missile; Project Dhvani, a winged glide body vehicle and anti-hypersonic missiles.

=== Production ===
Dr. Anil Kumar, the director of Advanced Systems Laboratory, revealed in October 2025 that LRAShM is entering limited serial production after completing all necessary design reviews and flight validation milestones. Before a full-scale induction, the missile would be manufactured in small quantities for DRDO and the Indian military to undergo operational evaluation trials.

== Trials ==
- The first test was conducted on an unspecified date in 2023 as per the 2023 Year End Review of the Ministry of Defence.
- The missile was again tested on 16 November 2024 from the Abdul Kalam Island, Odisha. The missile was tracked by optical sensors. The test was successful and terminal maneuvers and accuracy of the missile met the development team's expectations. Given that the missile and canister were designated "LR-02," it's possible that this was India's second test. Earlier, a report had suggested the test launch of a similar anti-ship ballistic missile that could target warships and aircraft carriers at long distances of over 1,000 km (620 mi).
- On 1 May 2026, a Phase-II Trial was conducted off the Odisha coast from the Integrated Test Range. The missile struck a simulated sea borne target at a range of 1,500 kilometers. The test validated the missile's terminal guidance precision, along with other mission objectives from launch to final impact, mid-course manoeuvres and a sustained high-velocity flight. A NOTAM had earlier been issued between 1 and 3 May 2026 over the Bay of Bengal with the no-fly and no-sail zone extending 1,680 kilometres in length. This was conducted as a part of Phase-II development programme.

== Design ==
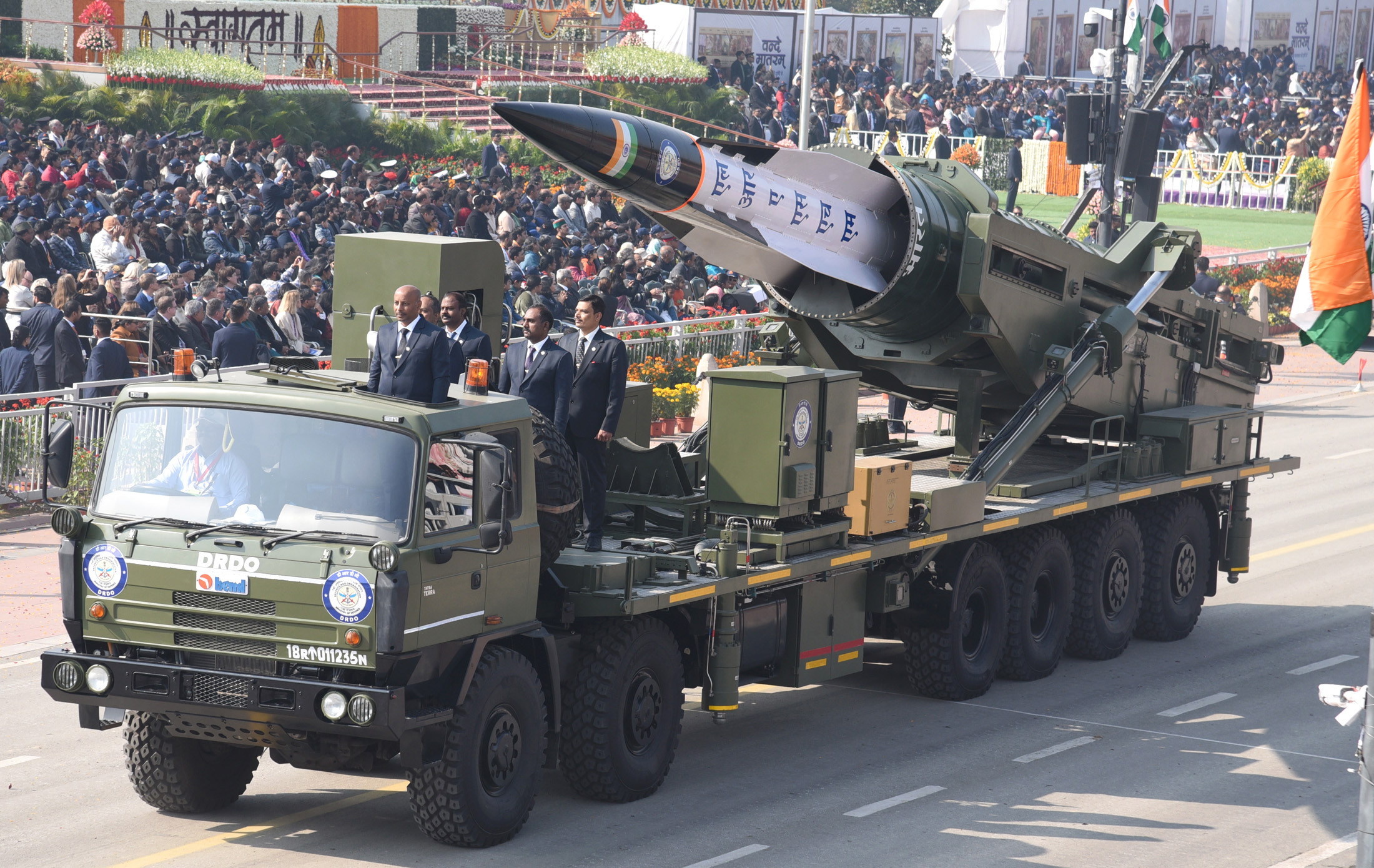
LRAShM

The missile features a delta-wing hypersonic glide vehicle mounted on a two stage solid propulsion rocket motor system which sends launch it partially into orbit at a hypersonic speed. The HGV can perform terminal maneuvers and follow highly complex and adaptive flight paths. It has a demonstrated range of at least 1,500 km (930 mi). The missile will have several warhead configurations for use in various roles by all the branches of the Indian Armed Forces.

By dimensions, the missile has a length of 13 m (43 ft), diameter of 1.4 metres (4 ft 7 in) and weighs 12 tonnes (26,000 lb). The radome, covered by a carbon-silicon carbide heat shield, includes a radio frequency seeker with a range of 50 km (31 mi).

LRAShM is cold-launched from a hermetically sealed container. Before the first-stage solid rocket motor ignites, it fires attitude control thrusters twice. Beginning around 8 seconds after lift-off, the missile's trajectory shifts from vertical to horizontal in about 6 seconds. A booster stage and a hypersonic sustainer engine make up the two solid propellant rocket stages of the LRAShM. The mid-body of the rocket has cruciform, short span, and long chord aerodynamic surfaces, while the aft body has four small triangular fins. Fins give flight stability, whereas mid-body aerodynamic surfaces give lift, flight path control, and maneuverability. The cruciform design lowers aerodynamic drag at high speed. According to official sources, the missile reaches Mach 10 during launch phase. In the mid-course, the missile maintains an average of Mach 5 and follows a quasi-ballistic trajectory during which it can perform manoeuvers within the atmosphere. In the terminal phase, the missile sensors can engage moving targets.

During acceleration, the composite structure and thermal shielding can sustain temperatures above 2,000 °C (3,630 °F; 2,270 K) without compromising stability. At hypersonic flight, the onboard computing systems manage electronic counter-countermeasures, and real-time trajectory adjustment. The missile's radio frequency seeker is an X-band synthetic-aperture radar with monopulse homing capabilities. It was developed by Electronics Corporation of India Limited and is based on a similar seeker that was designed for the BrahMos. The solid rocket booster stage of Sagarika served as the model for the LRAShM's propulsion system. The DRDO team accelerated the production process and reduced the development time by leveraging technologies developed for the Sagarika and Agni missiles.

=== Variants ===
- The original missile variant is a land-based anti-ship missile, with potential carrier killer roles, for the Indian Navy.
- A ship-launched variant is also planned for the Navy.
- A land-attack variant is also under development, as revealed by the DRDO chairman. This variant could be deployed by the Indian Army or the Air Force with multiple payload options, including a nuclear warhead.
- The maximum range of the missile might be extended to 3,500 km (2,200 mi) in future.

== Reactions to testing ==
According to Tom Karako, a missile defense specialist at the Center for Strategic and International Studies, India's LRAShM test is an element of a larger worldwide pattern towards the design, development, testing, and procurement of several different, extremely fast, maneuverable missiles.

According to Ankit Panda, Stanton Senior Fellow in the Nuclear Policy Program at the Carnegie Endowment for International Peace, the most recent LRAShM test is a part of the evolving Indian defense posture, which will rely on the Indian government's approval of hypersonic weapons and how it leads to an affordable acquisition of the platform for the Indian Armed Forces. Due to China's rapidly evolving mid-course defense capabilities against the current generation of missiles, the Indian strategic community considers LRAShM to be a viable choice in any future conflict with China.

== See also ==
- List of Indian military missiles – List of missiles of Indian Armed Forces
- NASM-MR – Indian anti-ship missile system
- NASM-SR – Indian anti-ship missile system
- DF-ZF – Chinese experimental hypersonic glide vehicle
- Avangard – Russian missile
- Hypersonic Technology Vehicle 2 – Experimental hypersonic glide vehicle
- Long-Range Hypersonic Weapon – U.S. Army prototype missile
- 3M22 Zircon – Russian supersonic anti-ship missile
- Kh-47M2 Kinzhal – Russian nuclear-capable air-launched ballistic missile
- Hypersonic Attack Cruise Missile – Australian-American air-launched hypersonic cruise missile
