= ET-LDHCM =

Hypersonic cruise missile

Extended Trajectory-Long Duration Hypersonic Cruise Missile (ET-LDHCM)
- Type: Hypersonic cruise missile
- Place of origin: India

Service history
- In service: Developmental trials
- Used by: Integrated Rocket Force, Indian Air Force, Indian Navy (intended)

Production history
- Designer: Defence Research and Development Laboratory
- Manufacturer: Dr. A. P. J. Abdul Kalam Missile Complex

Specifications
- Warhead: Conventional or nuclear
- Warhead weight: 1,000–2,000 kilograms (2,200–4,400 lb)
- Engine: Scramjet
- Operational range: >1,500 kilometres (930 mi)
- Maximum speed: >Mach 8

The Extended Trajectory-Long Duration Hypersonic Cruise Missile (ET-LDHCM) is a scramjet-powered, conventional, and nuclear capable long range hypersonic cruise missile being developed as part of Project Vishnu under the Hypersonic Cruise Missile Development Programme by the Defence Research and Development Organisation with private defence contractors and small and medium enterprises for the Indian Armed Forces. ET-LDHCM is one among the twelve distinct hypersonic systems that DRDO is working on for an offensive and defensive role.

It can fly at low altitudes, perform mid-air directional maneuvers while retaining structural integrity at hypersonic flight. With thermal shielding of up to 2,000 °C (3,630 °F; 2,270 K), ET-LDHCM can withstand high temperature during acceleration, without losing stability. It is designed to outperform Indian military's present fleet of missiles and interceptors. ET-LDHCM being made interoperable with a variety of platforms that may launch from land, sea, or air, to target command centers, radar systems, naval fleets, and reinforced underground bunkers.

== History ==
Project Vishnu is a classified program run by the Defence Research and Development Organization that aims to create sophisticated hypersonic weapon technologies to greatly increase India's attack and strategic deterrence capabilities, especially in reaction to threats from China and Pakistan. Twelve different hypersonic systems, including offensive missiles and interceptors that can destroy approaching threats in midair, are being developed as part of this initiative.

From the early 2000s, DRDO has been conducting research on aeroacoustic studies for hypersonic vehicles, frequency selective surface applications using artificial intelligence, thermal barrier coatings, reaction control systems for hypersonic glide vehicles, and endothermic fuels for high-temperature applications. As early as 2004, DRDO began design work on Hypersonic Technology Demonstrator Vehicle, which is being developed for use as a carrier vehicle for long-range and hypersonic cruise missiles.

== Scramjet development ==
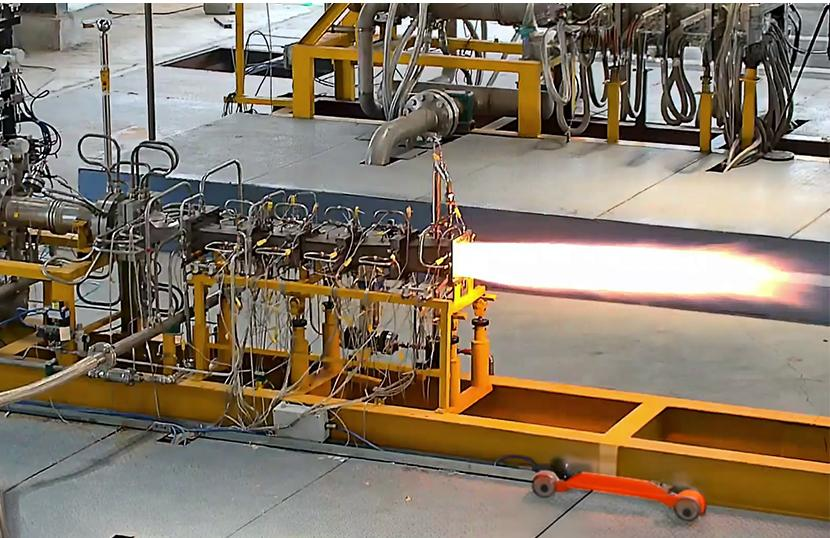
Active Cooled Scramjet Subscale Combustor ground testing in April 2025

The DRDL has developed multiple technologies for an Active Cooled Scramjet Combustor under the Hypersonic Cruise Missile Development Programme with the Department of Science and Technology and the private sector. The technologies include an improved ceramic thermal barrier coating (TBC), endothermic scramjet fuel, and a long-duration scramjet engine. A novel flame stabilization method was added to the scramjet combustor, which maintains a constant flame inside the combustor at air speeds greater than 1.5 km/s (5,400 km/h). In addition to improving cooling, the endothermic fuel shortens ignition times. With its high temperature resistance, the cutting-edge ceramic TBC can function above the melting point of steel. The Scramjet Connect Pipe Test (SCPT) Facility in Hyderabad to validate the technology was also designed and developed by the DRDL and the industry.

A 120-second ground test of an Active Cooled Scramjet Subscale Combustor for next-generation missiles was conducted by the DRDL at its SCPT facility on 21 January 2025. The test showed stable combustion and successful ignition. The second test of the subscale scramjet was conducted on 25 April 2025 for a longer duration of over 1,000 seconds in the Hyderabad facility. This validated the system's worthiness for a full scale flight worthy combustor testing.

The full scale actively cooled long duration Scramjet Engine was first tested on 9 January 2026 for a runtime of over 12 minutes or 700 seconds. The second test of the full-scale combustor was conducted on 9 May 2026 at the same facility for a duration of 1,200 seconds.

== Development ==
India successfully tested ET-LDHCM in July 2025. To follow the Atmanirbhar Bharat policy, the missile has been developed with domestic technology to achieve hypersonic speed, long range, and precision strike capability. With a velocity of around 11,000 km/h or more than 3 km/s, ET-LDHCM is intended to surpass Mach 8. The missile is designed to evade radar detection and air defense interception. With range exceeding 1,500 kilometres (930 mi), extendable to 2,500 kilometres (1,600 mi) for a surface-to-surface variant, it will carry conventional and nuclear warheads weighing up to 1,000–2,000 kilograms (2,200–4,400 lb). It will fly at low altitudes, has the ability to change its course in mid-flight based on local geographic factors, and can execute mid-air maneuvers.

The missile body is made of heat-resistant materials that can withstand temperatures as high as 2,000 °C (3,630 °F; 2,270 K). In order to shield it from sunlight and saline water, it has oxidation-resistant coating. The missile will be launched from the sea, the air using platforms such as Sukhoi Su-30MKI or Dassault Rafale, or from the ground. The missile's active-cooled scramjet engine will burn fuel using atmospheric air, allowing it to sustain high speeds for extended periods of time. The missile construction is underway at Dr. A. P. J. Abdul Kalam Missile Complex. ET-LDHCM is intended to launch precision strikes on enemy targets, including fortified military bunkers, aircraft carriers, and destroyers. Final preparations are underway for the maiden test. It will go through extensive testing to verify its guidance, speed, range, and ability to survive in harsh environments.

According to DRDO Chief Samir V. Kamat, as of 19 June 2025, official approval is still pending for the full-scale development. It could take five to seven years to get to operational level after clearance. It is expected that Project Vishnu's development and deployment cycles will be expedited. The ET-LDHCM will be made fully operational by 2030. With a greater range and speed than BrahMos, ET-LDHCM's multi-platform support is intended to offer reliable preemptive strike. It will be deployed across all branches of the Indian Armed Forces.

== Trial ==
- 14-16 July 2025: As per media reports, the DRDO has successfully tested ET-LDHCM from a test range on the eastern coast of India, The missile achieved its intended trajectory and hit its target with extreme accuracy. The performance stability is maintained at temperatures as high as 2,000 °C (3,630 °F; 2,270 K) during hypersonic travel, withstanding significant thermal stress. For operational flexibility, it will be integrated with a variety of platforms. To improve survivability against electronic countermeasures, increase range, and fine-tune the guidance system, more tests are planned.

== See also ==
- List of Indian military missiles – used by or under development for Indian Armed Forces.
- HSTDV – hypersonic scramjet demonstrator developed by DRDO.
- BrahMos-II – hypersonic variant of BrahMos jointly developed by India and Russia.
- 3M22 Zircon – a Russian hypersonic cruise missile.
- Long-Range Hypersonic Weapon – boost-glide hypersonic weapon being developed by the U.S.A
- ASN4G – air-launched hypersonic cruise missile being developed by France.
- Hypersonic Attack Cruise Missile – Australian-American air-launched hypersonic cruise missile project.
- Hypersonic Air-breathing Weapon Concept – scramjet-powered hypersonic air-launched cruise missile, developed by DARPA.
- SCIFiRE – a joint program between America and Australia for scramjet-powered missile.
