= Desert Sting =

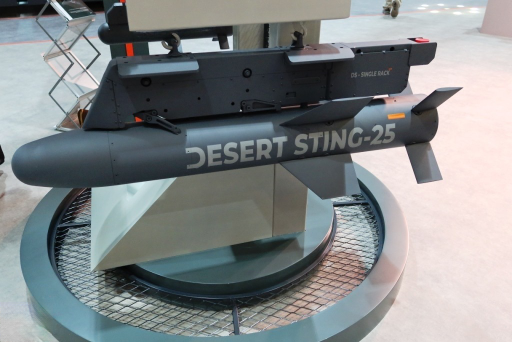
- Desert sting missile displayed at Dubai Air Show
- Type: Global Positioning System, Laser-guided bomb
- Place of origin: United Arab Emirates / South Africa

Service history
- In service: 2019–present
- Used by: United Arab Emirates Air Force

Production history
- Designer: Halcon Systems / Denel Dynamics
- Manufacturer: Halcon Systems
- Variants: See Variants

Specifications
- Warhead: DS-5: 5kg DS-8: 7kg DS-16: 15kg DS-25: 25kg
- Operational range: DS-5: 18km DS-8: 15km DS-16: 15km DS-25: 16km
- Launch platform: Reach-S; Denel Dynamics Seeker; Calidus B-250

Desert Sting, formerly known as p2, is a smart micro munition guided by Global Positioning System and laser-guided missile. It is manufactured by Halcon Systems a subsidiary of EDGE Group.

== Variants ==
- Desert Sting (DS-5)
- Desert Sting (DS-8)
- Desert Sting (DS-16)
- Desert Sting (DS-25)

== Users ==
- United Arab Emirates - In 2019, Halcon signed a US$1 billion (AED3.6 billion) contract to supply Desert Sting-16 (DS-16) to United Arab Emirates armed forces. Also in 2021 Halon signed with UAE to deliver Desert Sting to the armed forces worth of $880 million (AED3.2 billion).

== See also ==
- Mini Akıllı Mühimmat
- ULPGM
