= Integrated Rocket Force (India) =

Proposed Indian military unit

- Country: India
- Type: Conventional rocket-missile force
- Role: Strategic deterrence
- Part of: Indian Armed Forces
- Equipment: Hypersonic weapons; Ballistic missiles; Cruise missiles; Multiple rocket launchers

The Integrated Rocket Force (IRF) is a proposed tri-service entity to be formed under the Indian Armed Forces which will operate conventional weapons like ballistic missiles, cruise missiles and multiple rocket launchers. This will be separate from the in-service Strategic Forces Command which is tasked with nuclear deterrence.

== History ==
The concept of a Rocket Force was initially proposed by India's first Chief of Defence Staff, General Bipin Rawat, in September 2021 following the 2020 Galwan skirmishes. This came amid a reported reassessment of India’s capacity to counter the scale and precision of long-range strike capabilities fielded by the People's Liberation Army Rocket Force (PLARF). The IRF will have up to medium-range surface-to-surface strike capabilities and will assist India's "non-contact" warfare in the future. However, the composition and size of the inventory was yet to be decided.

The Rocket Force is in an early discussion stage as of April 2024. It is not decided whether the IRF will be a tri-service agency like Defence Cyber Agency and Defence Space Agency or a tri-service command-level organisation like Strategic Forces Command. Instead of relying solely on nuclear deterrence, the Center for Strategic and International Studies argues that India is being forced to reinvest in complementary and mixed strategies due to the proliferation of arms in a new technological era. A report on 27 January 2026 by the Hindustan Times indicated that the Army had raised 2 units of the rocket force and has increased the range of its artillery from 150 km to 1,000 km.

== Equipment ==
The Integrated Rocket Force's arsenal will initially consist of surface-to-surface missiles within the arsenal of the Indian Army and Air Force, beginning with the Pralay missiles. Later upon full maturity, all missiles and rocket systems of the Army, Navy, and Air Force will be operated under the IRF.

The proposed weapon systems to remain in IRF's arsenal include Pralay, LR–LACM, BrahMos and Pinaka MBRL. In 2024, it was reported that the Long Range – Anti Ship Missile (LRAShM) and its land-based hypersonic missile variant would form a part of the proposed Integrated Rocket Force. The missiles will be a medium-range ballistic missile (MRBM) with a range of more than 1,500 km (930 mi). The BM-04, a derivative of the Agni-P, is being developed to satisfy the need for a conventional ballistic missile with a range of 1,500 km (930 mi) for the proposed Integrated Rocket Force. Utilizing a boostglide vehicle, BM-04 will reach Mach 5 and beyond in order to neutralize anti-access/area denial (A2/AD) environment. In January 2026, the Indian Army placed an order for Suryastra multi calibre rocket launcher with NIBE Limited. The ammunition include rockets with a maximum range of 150 km and 300 km and loitering munition with 100 km range. The system will be part of the deep strike rocket force which is reported to be a part of the Regiment of Artillery.

=== Gallery ===
Pinaka MBRL

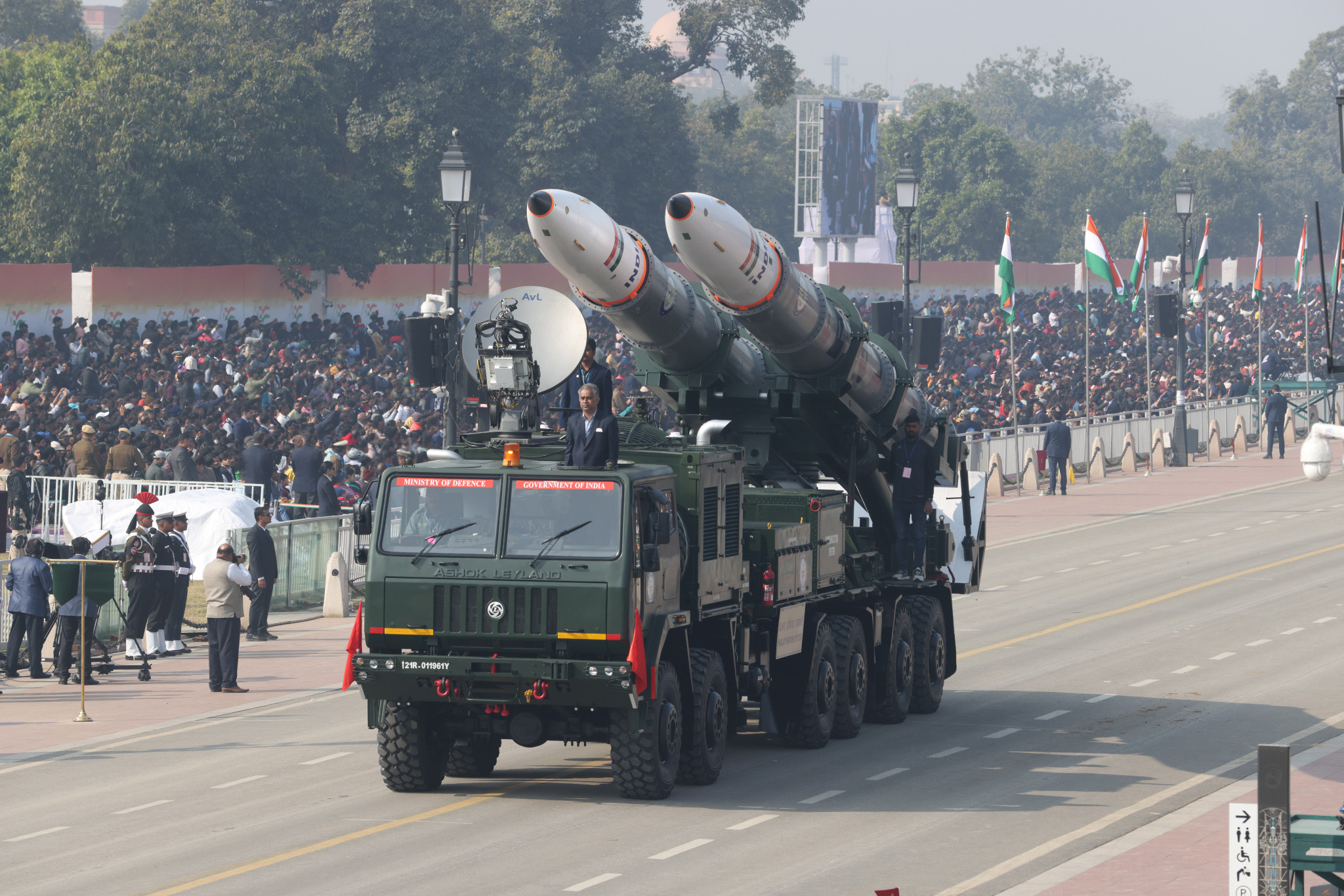
Pralay short range ballistic missile

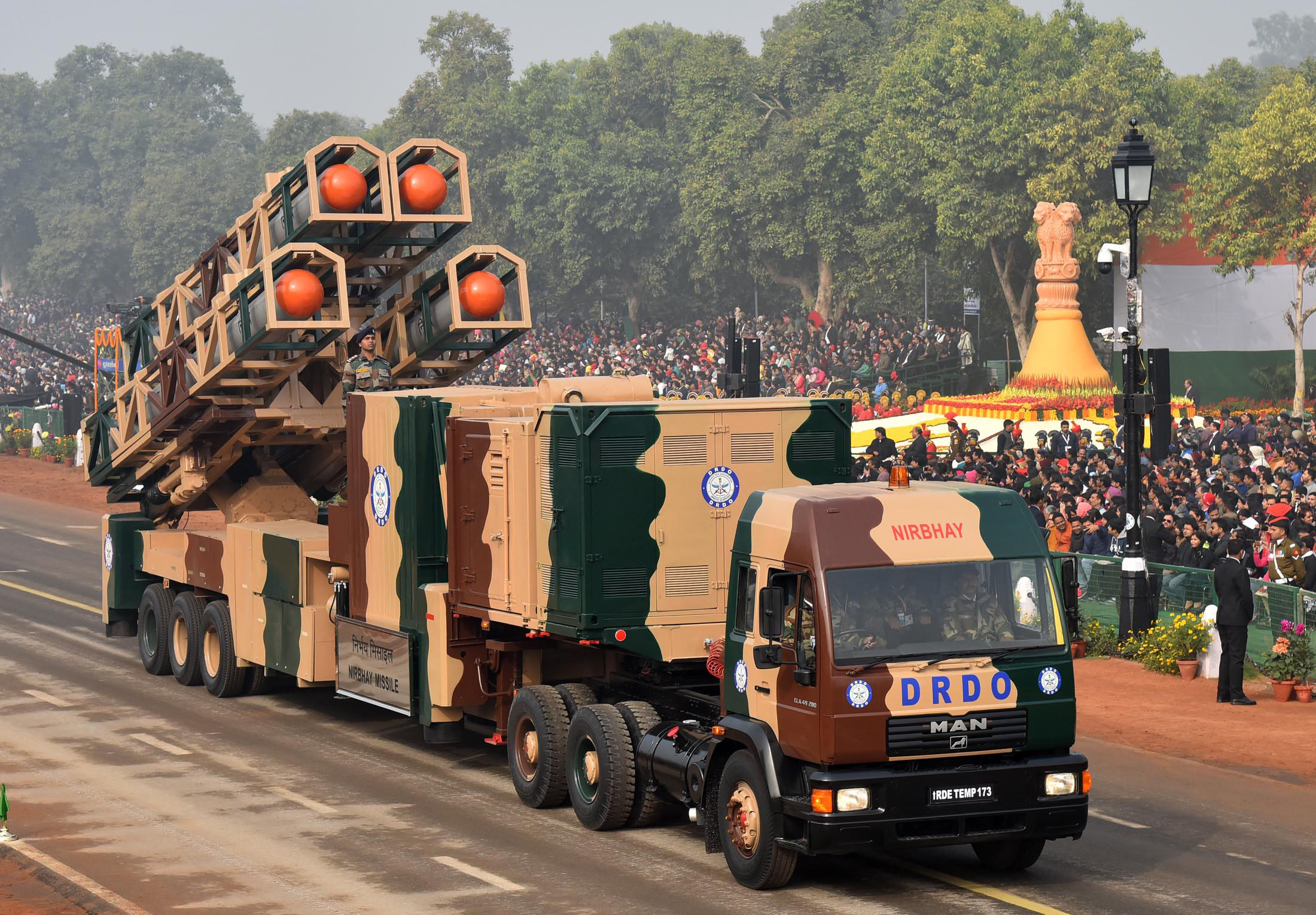
Nirbhay subsonic cruise missile

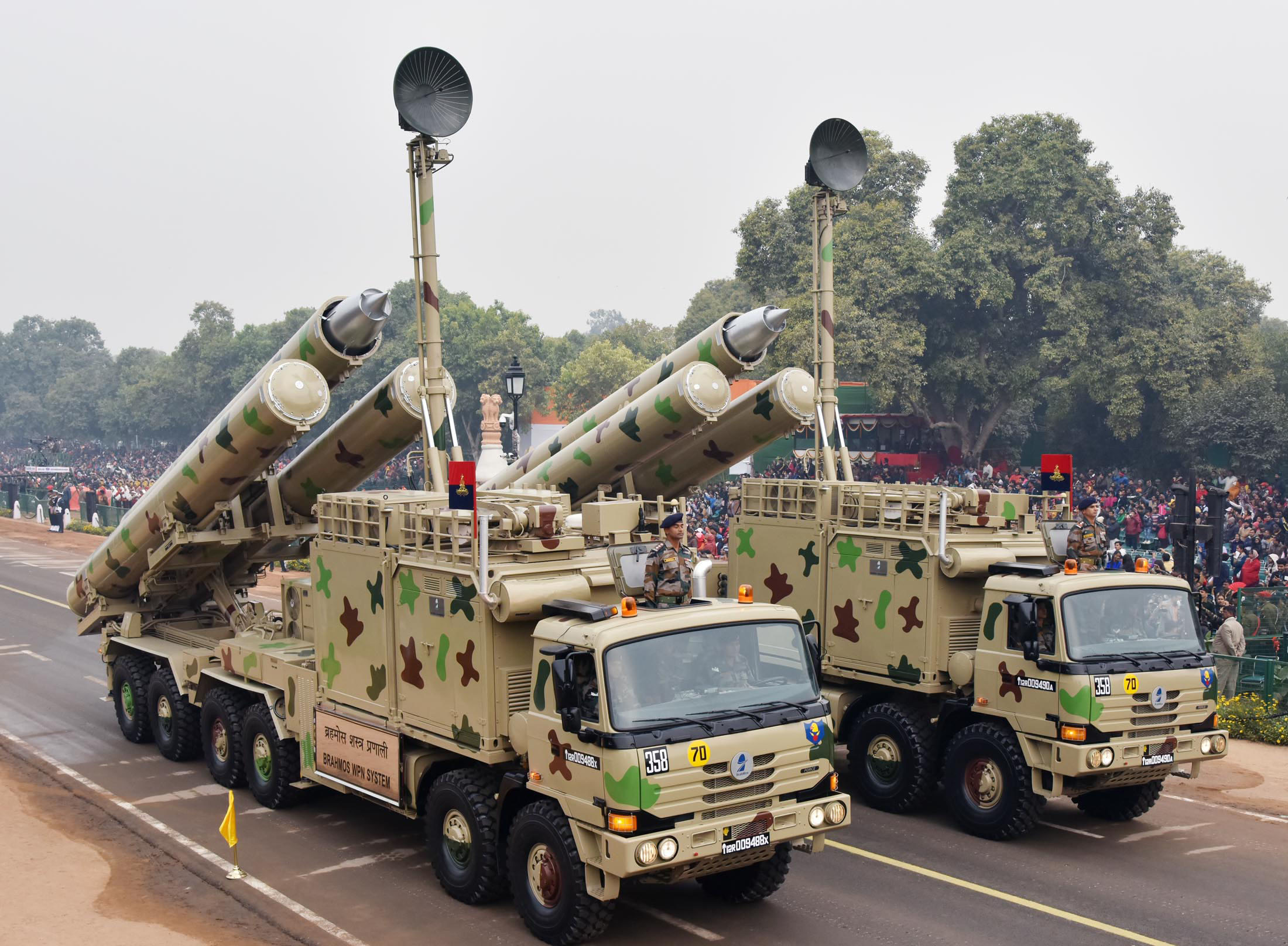
BrahMos supersonic cruise missile

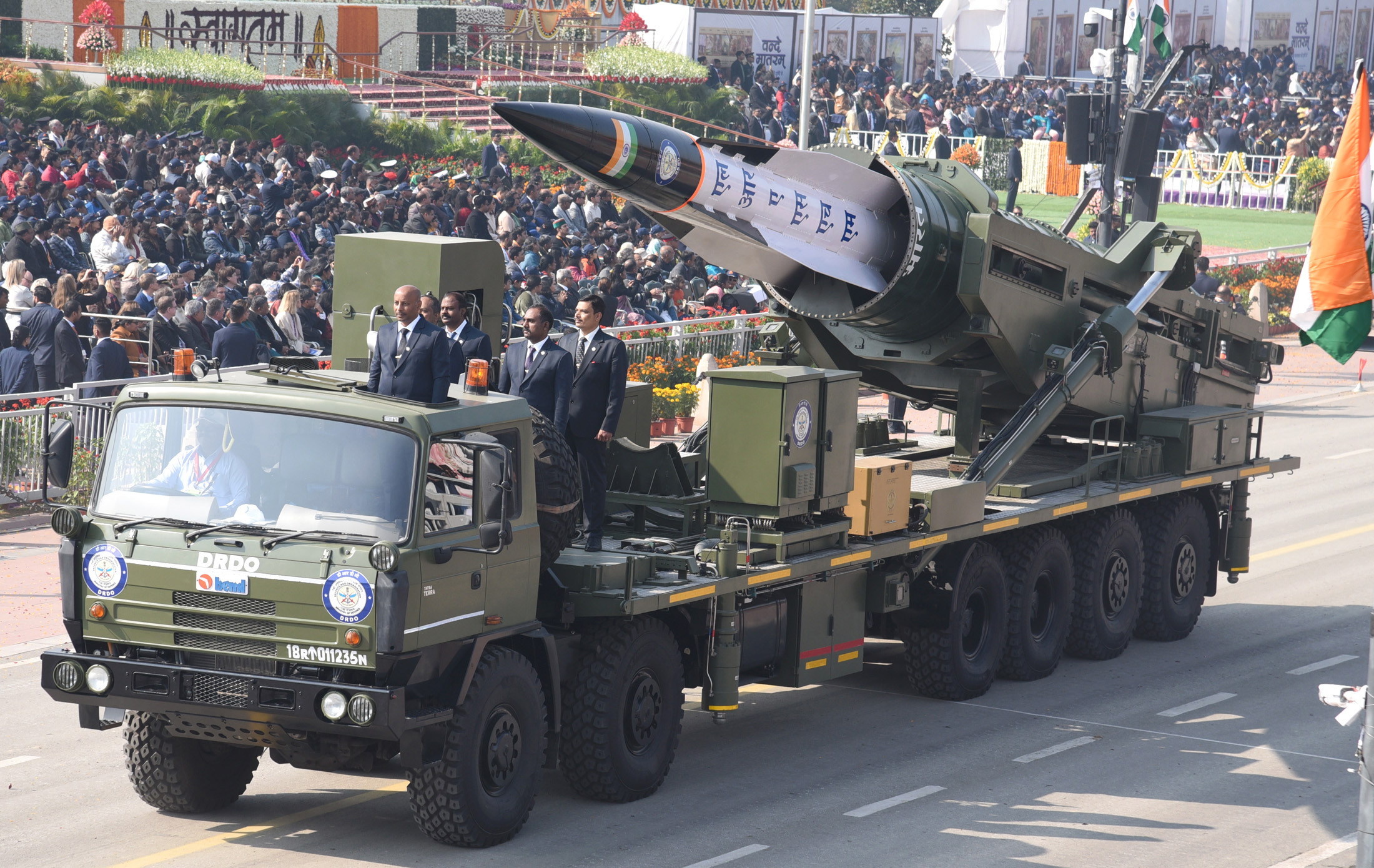
LRAShM long range hypersonic anti-ship missile

== See also ==
Indian Armed Forces Integrated entities

- Defence Planning Committee, tri-services command at policy level with NSA as its chief
- Chief of Defence Staff (India), professional head of the Indian Armed Forces
- Integrated Defence Staff, tri-services command at strategic level composed of MoD, MEA and tri-services staff
- Integrated Theatre Command (India)
  - Northern Theatre Command (India)
  - Western Theatre Command (India)
  - Maritime Theatre Command
  - Andaman and Nicobar Command
  - Strategic Forces Command, nuclear command of India
    - Indian Nuclear Command Authority, Strategic Forces Command
  - Defence Cyber Agency
  - Defence Space Agency
  - Special Operations Division

Assets

- List of Indian Air Force stations
- List of Indian Navy bases
- List of active Indian Navy ships
- India's overseas military bases

Other Nations

- Peoples Liberation Army Rocket Force
- Army Rocket Force Command
- Strategic Rocket Forces
- Rocket Forces and Artillery (Ukraine)
- United States Strategic Command
