= ULPGM =

Air-to-surface missile

ULPGM (UAV Launched Precision Guided Missile)
- Type: Air-to-surface missile
- Place of origin: India

Service history
- In service: Indian Armed Forces
- Used by: Indian Army
- Wars: 2025 India–Pakistan conflict

Production history
- Designer: Research Centre Imarat
- Designed: 2022–present
- Manufacturer: Adani Defence & Aerospace; Bharat Dynamics Limited
- Produced: 2024–present
- Variants: See Specifications

Specifications
- Accuracy: 10 cm CEP
- Launch platform: Unmanned aerial vehicles

The ULPGM is a family of autonomous, fire-and-forget, precision guided air-to-surface missiles, which can be launched from an unmanned aerial vehicle. This project is a collaboration between the Defence Research and Development Organization, and Bengaluru-based private company Newspace Research & Technologies. The Adani Defence Systems and Technologies and the Bharat Dynamics Limited have been assigned to manufacture the weapon system under the Development cum Production Partner programme (DcPP). It is a component of India's rising focus around precision strikes without necessitating human intervention. With its multi-platform compatibility, lightweight design, and extreme accuracy, ULPGM is intended to give the Indian Armed Forces strategic flexibility on the battlefield.

ULPGM can engage a variety of stationary and moving targets. In addition to Newspace Research & Technologies, DRDO is aggressively working with a number of other Indian firms to integrate the missile with long-range and high-endurance UAVs.

== Development ==
The three different variants of the ULPGM family—V1, V2, and V3—are each intended to suit different combat settings and operational necessities. The main distinctions between V1, V2, and V3 include improvements in performance, range, and guidance system. The Dr. A. P. J. Abdul Kalam Missile Complex served as the site for the ULPGM development, which is primarily being worked on by the Research Centre Imarat. All the subsystems such as the guidance, propulsion, warhead mechanism etc., were developed in collaboration with the Defence Electronics Research Laboratory, Terminal Ballistics Research Laboratory, High Energy Materials Research Laboratory, and Defence Research and Development Laboratory. Additionally, more than 30 Indian small and medium enterprises and start-ups contributed to various components.

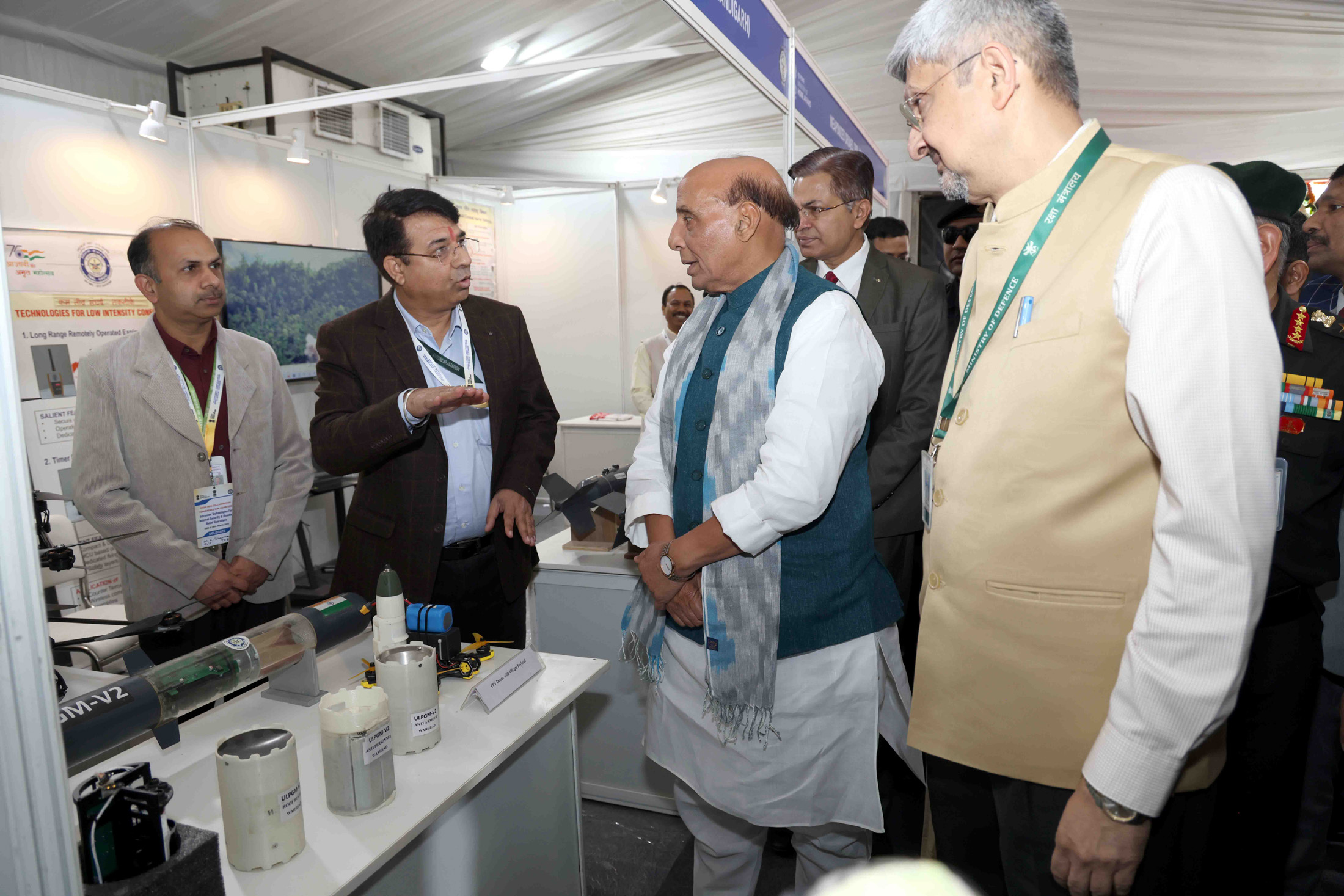
On March 4, 2025, Minister of Defence Rajnath Singh, inspected the ULPGM-V2 and its modular warhead on exhibit at DRDO Bhawan in New Delhi.

The baseline version, the ULPGM-V1, is 680–690 mm long, 100 mm in diameter, and weighs 5 kg. It is a free fall nosedive missile with no propulsion system. It can be dropped from 750 m to 2 km altitude, giving it a 1.5–2 km range. In addition to carrying a 2 kg warhead that can be pre-fragmented for anti-personnel role, explosively formed penetrator against armor from standoff range, or bunker buster to penetrate up to 6 inches of reinforced concrete, the V1 variant uses an uncooled imaging infrared seeker for guidance. For more accurate targeting, the ULPGM-V2 has an advanced navigation system and a longer range. It weighs 8.5 kg with 890 mm in length, and 100 mm in diameter. A solid fuel based dual-thrust rocket motor with thrust vectoring capability using smokeless propellant has been incorporated into the V2 version. Depending on the release altitude, it can reach ranges of 4–6 km. The improved aerodynamics and propulsion system in the V2 variant allow for a longer range than the V1 variant. The V2 version's precision strike capability and flight adaptability are greatly increased by its S-band based two-way datalink, which enables real-time target updates and course corrections. ULPGM-V2 has an EFP warhead designed by TBRL to destroy enclosed soft targets and penetrate hardened rooftops.

The extended-range version, known as ULPGM-V3 or ULM-ER, was on display at Aero India 2025. It includes laser guidance with passive homing, and a high-definition dual-channel IIR seeker for both day and night operations. A dual-thrust solid motor propels the 12.5 kg fire-and-forget missile, giving it a maximum launch altitude of 4 km during the day and 2.5 km at night. The range has been increased to 10 km. A two-way datalink facilitates re-targeting and mid-course correction. The munition can strike a variety of stationary and moving targets thanks to its modular warhead configurations which include an anti-armour version for penetrating tanks, a PCB warhead against bunkers, and a pre-fragmented warhead for anti-personnel role with a higher lethality zone. Its circular error probable is around 10 cm. It can function in autonomous mode, in settings where real-time control and communication is restricted or jammed.

The V3 version's high-definition dual-channel seeker allows it to engage a variety of targets in both low- and high-altitude terrain in day as well as night conditions. The lightweight design of the ULPGM-V3 guarantees compatibility with a variety of UAVs.

== Trials ==
25 July 2025: The ULPGM-V3 successfully completed flight tests in anti-armour configuration, at the National Open Area Range (NOAR) in Kurnool. The flight trials were conducted using a hexacopter UAV developed by DRDO, as a launch platform. The missile was made to hit a broad range of targets in both low- and high-altitude environments. ULPGM-V3 has a tandem-charge warhead that can defeat tanks with rolled homogeneous armour, and an explosive reactive armour in top-attack mode. Within an infantry unit, individual soldiers can carry the missile and operate it.

19 May 2026: The ULPGM-V3 successfully completed final developmental trials in air-to-ground and air-to-air modes from the NOAR in Kurnool using an integrated Ground Control System. The weapon system was integrated with a UAV developed by the NewSpace Research and Technologies (NRT) for the trials. The missile was there after cleared for mass production.

== Order ==
- Under the emergency powers granted by the Ministry of Defence, Adani Defence & Aerospace received an order for the ULPGM from the Indian Army in August 2023. The delivery started on 18 May 2024. The first batch of 250 ULPGM have been delivered, and by the end of 2024, the remaining units which include 70 UAV launchers will be delivered.
- In 2023-24, the Indian Army has awarded Bharat Dynamics Limited a ₹105 crore (US$11 million) contract to manufacture 220 ULPGM-V2 units, each of which will cost roughly ₹4.77 million (US$50,000).
- Adani Defence & Aerospace delivered ULPGM and Agnikaa VTOL-1 kamikaze drone to the Western Command on 12 May 2026. The orders was placed as part of the sixth emergency procurement (EP-6).

== Platforms ==
- Raphe mPhibr MR-10 high-endurance, swarm-capable surveillance drone
- Raphe mPhibr MR-20 high-altitude logistics drone

== Operational history ==
In 2025, ULPGM was used by the Indian Armed Forces during Operation Sindoor.

== Specifications ==
Parameters	ULPGM		
Parameters	V-1	V-2	V-3 (ULM-ER)
Range	1.5–2 km (0.93–1.24 mi)	4–6 km (2.5–3.7 mi)	Day: 4 km (2.5 mi); Night: 2.5 km (1.6 mi). Upgraded to 10 km (6.2 mi).
Weight	5 kg (11 lb)	8.5 kg (19 lb)	12.5 kg (28 lb)
Length	680–690 mm (2.23–2.26 ft)	890 mm (2.92 ft)	Unknown
Diameter	100 mm (0.33 ft)		Unknown
Warhead	Pre-fragmented, EFP, PCB	BCF, EFP, HEAT	Pre-fragmented, tandem-charge, PCB
Warhead weight	2 kg (4.4 lb)	Unknown	Unknown
Detonation mechanism	Unknown	Unknown	Unknown
Engine	Free fall nosedive	Dual-thrust rocket motor + thrust vectoring	
Propellant	Free fall nosedive	Solid fuel (smokeless)	
Flight altitude	750 m (2,460 ft) to 2 km (6,600 ft)	Unknown	Unknown
Maximum speed	Unknown	Unknown	Unknown
Guidance	Imaging infrared	Mid-course update via two-way datalink + electro-optical sensor	Mid-course: re-targeting + course correction via two-way datalink Terminal: laser guidance + passive homing + dual channel IIR
Status	In service.	In service.	Under trials.

== See also ==
- Desert Sting
- Mini Akıllı Mühimmat
- AGM-176 Griffin
