= Prahaar (missile) =

Indian tactical ballistic missile

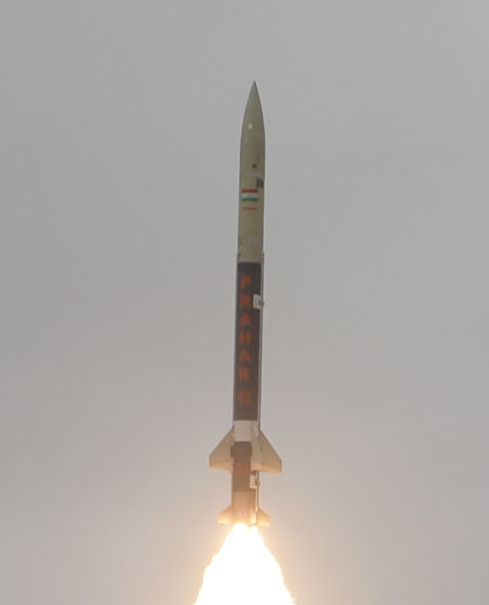
- Prahaar missile launched from a Road Mobile System
- Type: Tactical ballistic missile
- Place of origin: India

Production history
- Designer: Defence Research and Development Organisation
- Manufacturer: Bharat Dynamics Limited

Specifications
- Mass: 1,280 kg (2,820 lb)
- Length: 7.32 m (24 ft 0 in)
- Diameter: 0.42 m (1 ft 5 in)
- Warhead: High explosives, cluster munition
- Warhead weight: 250 kg
- Engine: Single-stage rocket motor
- Propellant: Solid fuel
- Operational range: 150 km (93 mi) (Prahaar); 170 km (110 mi) (Pragati); 200 km (120 mi) (Pranash)
- Flight altitude: 35 km (22 mi)
- Maximum speed: Mach 4
- Guidance system: Mid-course: FOG-INS + multi-GNSS; Terminal: ARH
- Accuracy: 10 m (33 ft) CEP
- Launch platform: Tatra-BEML/Tata TEL

Prahaar (lit. 'Strike') is an Indian solid-fuel road-mobile surface to surface tactical ballistic missile developed by the Defence Research and Development Organisation (DRDO). Prahaar is expected to replace the Prithvi-I short-range ballistic missile in Indian service.

== Development ==
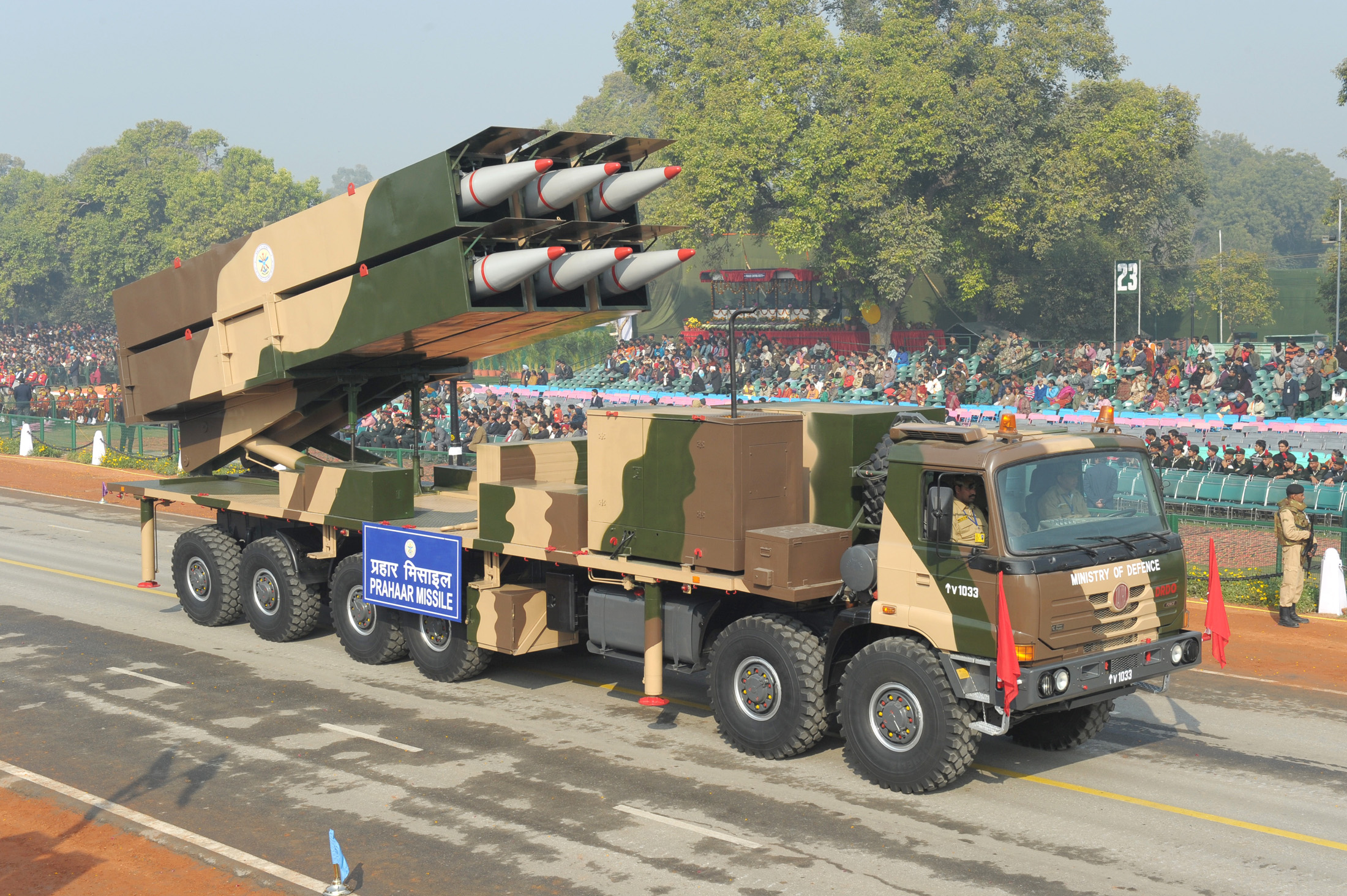
Mobile truck-based launcher for Prahaar

Prahaar is developed to provide a cost-effective, quick-reaction, all-weather, all-terrain, highly accurate battlefield support tactical weapon system. The development of the missile was carried out by the Defence Research and Development Organisation (DRDO) scientists in a span of less than two years. The maneuvering capability, greater acceleration, better accuracy and faster deployment fills the short-range tactical battlefield role as required by the Indian Army to take out strategic and tactical targets. The mobile launch platform will carry six missiles that can be deployed in stand-alone and canisterised mode, which can have different kind of warheads meant for different targets and can be fired in salvo mode in all directions covering the entire azimuth plane.

This solid-fueled missile can be launched within 2–3 minutes without any preparation, providing significantly better reaction time than liquid-fueled Prithvi ballistic missiles and act as a gap filler in the 150 km (93 mi) range, between the Pinaka Multi Barrel Rocket Launcher and Smerch MBRL in one end and the Prithvi ballistic missiles on the other.

As per Indian military experts, Prahaar is to counter weapon systems that can fall between 40 km to 150 km range such as Nasr. DRDO also confirmed that Prahaar is only for carrying out strikes in conventional warfare with no nuclear use.

== Testing ==
Prahaar was test-fired successfully on 21 July 2011 from the Integrated Test Range (ITR) at Chandipur. During the test, the missile traveled a distance of 150 km (93 mi) in about 250 seconds meeting all launch objectives and struck a pre-designated target in the Bay of Bengal with a high degree of accuracy of less than 10 m (33 ft).

On 20 September 2018, Prahaar was test fired for the second time from a road-mobile launcher capable of carrying 6 missiles at ITR Complex III, Chandipur.

== Variants ==
=== Pragati ===
(Literally 'Progress' in Sanskrit)

The export variant of the system is the Pragati surface to surface missile. It was unveiled for the first time by DRDO at ADEX 2013 in Seoul, South Korea. Pragati has a higher range of 170 km and shares 95 percent of Prahaar's hardware components.

=== Pranash ===
(Literally 'Destruction of Breath' in Sanskrit)

Due to limited 150 km (93 mi) range of Prahaar, the Indian Army wanted a new tactical ballistic missile with range of 200 km. The configuration of the new missile called Pranash has been frozen by DRDO with the developmental trials beginning from 2021. It will carry a conventional warhead, powered by single-stage solid propellant which will be offered for user trials within two years. India is looking for exporting this missile to friendly nations as it will come outside the purview of Missile Technology Control Regime (MTCR) which restricts export of delivery vehicle above 300 km range.

== Derivatives ==
The short-range conventionally armed Pralay missile was designed using several technologies that were initially developed form the Prahaar tactical ballistic missile.

== See also ==
- Integrated Guided Missile Development Programme – (India)
- Project Devil – (India)
- Prithvi missiles – (India)
- BM-30 Smerch – (Soviet Union)
- Pinaka multi-barrel rocket launcher – (India)
- Pralay (missile) – (India)

=== Comparable missile ===
- Abdali-I – (Pakistan)
- MGM-140 ATACMS – (United States)
- LORA (missile) – (Israel)
- Nasr (missile) – (Pakistan)
- KN-25 – (North Korea)
