= Amogha missile =

Amogha Missile
- Type: Anti-tank guided missile
- Place of origin: India

Service history
- In service: 2016 (proposed)

Production history
- Manufacturer: Bharat Dynamics Limited

Specifications
- Warhead: Tandem-charge HEAT
- Blast yield: Penetration: 650mm of ERA
- Operational range: Amogha-I: 2.5-2.8 km; Amogha-III: 200m–2.5 km
- Guidance system: Amogha-I: Semi-automatic command to line of sight; Amogha-II: Semi-automatic command to line of sight; Amogha-III: Imaging infrared (IIR) + Electro-optical (EO)

The Amogha-1 (lit. 'Unfailing') is a second generation guided anti-tank missile with a range up to 2.8 km (1.7 mi). It is under development by Research and Development Division of Bharat Dynamics Limited at Hyderabad. It is the first missile designed and tested by Bharat Dynamics. The missile will be produced in two versions. The land version has already been tested. The infrared version of the missile uses a "thermal intelligent vision" to attack its target.

== Testing ==
- The Amogha-I missile has a range of 2.5 to 2.8 km (1.6 to 1.7 mi). It was reported that two missiles were tested in September 2015 at the Babina Army Range in Madhya Pradesh. Both missiles hit their targets in the test. These tests found no significant difference between this missile and other anti-tank missiles. The performance of the missile is measured by both the gunner and commander of the Advanced Target Acquisition systems.
- On 14 October 2017, the Amogha-II missile was successfully test fired for the first time using a launcher on the ground.
- On 26 March 2023, BDL successfully test fired Amogha-III meeting all mission objectives.
- On 21 February 2024, Indian Army's Battle Axe Division (12 Infantry Division, part of XII Corps) tested the 2.5 km range ATGM in Jaisalmer district. The missile was fired from man portable tripod. The missile uses a tandem high-explosive anti-tank (HEAT) warhead to neutralise vehicles with explosive reactive armour (ERA).

== Variant ==
=== Amogha-II ===
Amogha-II uses Semi Automatic Command to Line of Sight (SACLOS) with a radio frequency seeker.

=== Amogha-III ===
On 7 February 2020, BDL unveiled third generation man portable Amogha-III ATGM at Defexpo 2020 in Lucknow. The missile has conventional cylindrical body, eight mid-body foldable fins and four larger aft fins for flight stabilization. It is powered by dual-thrust rocket motor with thrust vector control and burns smokeless propellant. The terminal seeker has dual mode imaging infrared (IIR) and electro-optical (EO) assembly. Amogha-III can hit the target at top attack and direct attack mode. Target must be locked before launch. The missile uses an anti-armour tandem warhead that can penetrate 650 mm beyond Explosive Reactive Armour (ERA). Operational range is between 200–2,500 m (0.12–1.55 mi) with 18 kg (40 lb) weight although BDL is planning to reduce it to 15–16 kg (33–35 lb) once the missile hits mass production. The complete system includes missile, tripod and a command launch unit (CLU) with remote operation capability.

== Further Developments ==
The Amogha will be configured to be used on HAL Rudra and HAL Prachand. Soon it will have land version, an air-launched version and a portable version.

== See also ==
- List of anti-tank guided missiles
- List of missiles
