= Pralay (missile) =

Indian tactical to short-range ballistic missile

- Flight test of Pralay ballistic missile on November 5, 2026
- Type: Tactical ballistic missile
- Place of origin: India

Service history
- Used by: Indian Army; Indian Air Force

Production history
- Designer: Research Centre Imarat
- Manufacturer: Bharat Electronics; Bharat Dynamics Limited

Specifications
- Mass: 5 tonnes (4.9 long tons; 5.5 short tons)
- Length: > 7.5 - 11 m
- Diameter: > 420 mm, within 750 mm
- Warhead: HEPF, PCB, RDPS
- Warhead weight: 350–700 kg (770–1,540 lb); 500–1,000 kg (1,100–2,200 lb)
- Engine: Two stage rocket + MaRV
- Propellant: Solid
- Operational range: 150–500 km (93–311 mi)
- Maximum speed: Mach 6.1 (7,470 km/h; 4,640 mph; 2.08 km/s)
- Guidance system: Mid-course: INS; Terminal: MMW DSMAC + Radar Imaging
- Accuracy: <10 metres (33 ft) CEP
- Launch platform: 12 x 12 Ashok Leyland HMV TEL

Pralay (lit. 'Apocalypse') is a canisterised surface-to-surface, short-range, tactical ballistic missile, developed by the Defence Research and Development Organisation. It uses a combination of technologies created for the Prahaar tactical missile, and the exoatmospheric interceptor Prithvi Defence Vehicle. The project to develop Pralay was sanctioned in March 2015 with a budget of ₹332.88 crore (equivalent to ₹548 crore or US$57 million in 2026) and became ready for induction in 2022.

Pralay will become a part of the Integrated Rocket Force along with Nirbhay, BrahMos, and Pinaka.

== Development ==
Research Centre Imarat is the lead integrator of this project. Pralay belongs to the same class as Dongfeng 12 (CSS-X-15), Precision Strike Missile, 9K720 Iskander and Hyunmoo 2. Powered by a solid fuel rocket motor, the missile reportedly flies lower on a flatter trajectory and has the ability to perform terminal maneuvers to hinder anti-ballistic missile interceptors.

It was developed by DRDO under Project Pralay, to counter China's Dongfeng-12, and Pakistan's Nasr short-range missiles. Time from deployment to launch is reportedly within 10 minutes, while transition time from command to launch is reportedly 60 seconds. Bharat Electronics and Bharat Dynamics Limited are the development and production partners for the programme.

Pralay uses the same composite propellant developed by High Energy Materials Research Laboratory for Sagarika and K Missile family. The composite propellant is highly efficient and generates more energy compared to propellant used in Agni missile series. The aerodynamic characterization research was conducted at the National Aerospace Laboratories' 1.2m Trisonic Wind Tunnel Facility.

Pralay carries 350–700 kg and 500–1,000 kg High Explosive Preformed Fragmentation (HEPF), Penetration-Cum-Blast (PCB) and Runway Denial Penetration Submunition (RDPS) at a range of 150 km to 500 km. Pralay is designed to target radar and communication installations, command and control centers and advance airfields using conventional warhead. The system is road mobile and meets the tactical ballistic missile requirement of the Indian Army. Pralay fills the gap of a conventionally armed ballistic missile that is not hampered by 'No First Use' nuclear policy.

Further work is in progress to extend the range by another few hundred kilometers. In 2022, the missile was ready for induction.

== Testing ==
Pralay launched from Abdul Kalam Island on 23 December 2021.

- 22 December 2021: DRDO conducted the maiden test of Pralay from Abdul Kalam Island. The missile followed quasi ballistic trajectory reaching the designated target at 400 km (250 mi) with high degree of accuracy, validating controls, guidance system and mission algorithms.
- 23 December 2021: DRDO conducted another test of Pralay from Abdul Kalam Island. The test was conducted using heavier payload to check the lethality and accuracy of the weapon. Pralay covered the maximum range of 500 km (310 mi) and was monitored by range sensors and instruments, including telemetry, radar and electro-optic tracking system deployed across the eastern coast and the downrange ships positioned near the impact point.
- 7 November 2023: DRDO launched Pralay from Abdul Kalam Island. The test was successful and met all the required mission objectives.
- 28–29 July 2025: The missile was tested successfully from Abdul Kalam Island as part of User Evaluation Trials. The missile followed the designated trajectory and was accurate in meeting the tests objectives — demonstrate its maximum and minimum range capabilities. This marked the end of Phase-I flights.
- 31 December 2025: DRDO successfully launched two Pralay missiles in quick succession using the same launcher from the Integrated Test Range for user evaluation trials. Both missiles met all flight objectives by staying on their designated trajectories. Telemetry systems confirmed the terminal phase at the impact points, while tracking sensors validated the performance. The test proved reliable operation, precision, and preparedness of the missile system.
- 5 November 2026: As part of a user evaluation trial, Pralay was once more test fired from the Launch Complex-III (LC-III) at the Integrated Test Range, Chandipur. The missiles engaged simulated targets at a distance of 500 km (310 mi). According to the Ministry of Defense, the missile will soon be introduced into the armed forces following the trial's successful conclusion.

== Induction ==
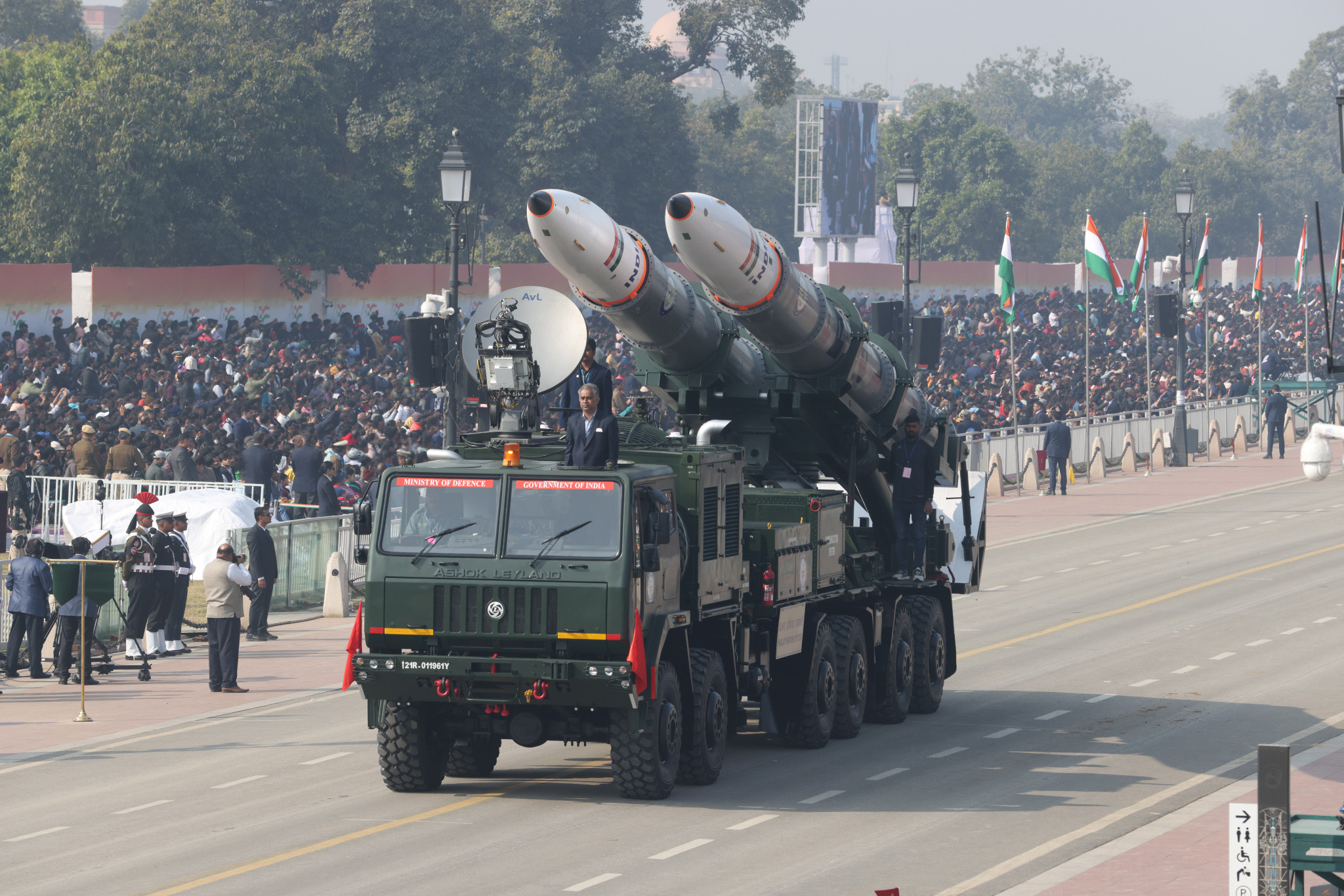
Pralay missiles on Ashok Leyland 12×12 high mobility vehicle.

The development phase of Pralay began in 2015 and completed in four years. DRDO will conduct four test flights before the missile being commissioned. According to analysts, development of Pralay achieved an important milestone for India's future Rocket Force. In view of 2020–2021 China–India skirmishes, Indian Armed Forces in December 2022 moved proposal for acquisition of Pralay missile. On 25 December 2022, Ministry of Defence cleared the order for 120 missiles for the Indian Air Force.

Two more units of 250 Pralay missiles worth ₹7,500 crore are in advance stages of acquisition as of April 2023.

The purchase of a Pralay regiment for the Indian Army was approved by the MoD on 17 September 2023. A similar proposal was earlier cleared for the Indian Air Force. The missile will be deployed with conventional warhead for tactical roles along Line of Actual Control and Line of Control.

As of September 2024, the user trials and eventual induction of Pralay missiles are expected soon.

On 26 January 2025, the Pralay twin launcher system based on Ashok Leyland 12×12 high mobility vehicle was featured at the 76th Republic Day Parade. The development of the missile is now over. In 2026–2027, the first Pralay missile regiment will begin service with the Integrated Rocket Force.

== Future development ==
According to reports, the Pralay missile's air-launched version is in development. The air-launched version seeks to increase the missile's operational versatility by permitting deployment from aerial assets, to increase the engagement envelope, and enable more rapid and nimble reactions in combat situations.

In 2025, INDIGIS-Enterprise, developed by Center for Artificial Intelligence and Robotics, replaced imported commercial off-the-shelf GIS. It will provide Pralay missile commanders with offline digital maps that, in the absence of the internet, makes it easy to view the locations of the missile launchers and the different kinds of Pralay missiles that are available, such as penetration-aid sub-munition variants, and conventional missiles for regular strikes. They can also see all target data, no escape zone locations, and the maximum range of each missile. The INDIGIS software kit has been improved and enhanced by the Indian private sector company MicroGenesis Techsoft to match the Pralay missile and prepare it for military use.

On 12 July 2026, Hindustan Times reported that, in an attempt to expand private sector participation in India's strategic missile sector, the defence ministry will issue a request for proposal (RFP) to invite bids from private sector companies to manufacture the Astra Mk 2 missile. The current manufacturer of the missile, Bharat Dynamics Limited, reportedly cannot cater to the growing demands from the Indian Armed Forces and export customers. A similar suite will also be followed for the Pralay missile.

== Export ==
According to reports, advanced negotiations are underway to sell the Pralay missile to Armenia, and the India's Ministry of Defense has approved its transfer. The export version's payload carrying capability is limited to 500 kilograms (1,100 lb), and its range is limited to 300 kilometres (190 mi) in order to comply with the Missile Technology Control Regime.

Early-stage negotiations to sell the Pralay missile to the Philippines are also reportedly in progress.

== Operators ==
India

- Indian Army - 250 on order
- Indian Air Force - 120 on order
- Integrated Rocket Force (planned)

== See also ==
- Shaurya (missile)
- Pragati (missile)
- Pranash (missile)
- Prahaar (missile)

=== Comparable missiles ===
- Dongfeng 12 – (China)
- Precision Strike Missile – (United States)
- Predator Hawk – (Israel)
- 9K720 Iskander – (Russia)
- Hyunmoo-2 – (South Korea)
