= Hypersonic Technology Demonstrator Vehicle =

Hypersonic demonstration aircraft

HSTDV
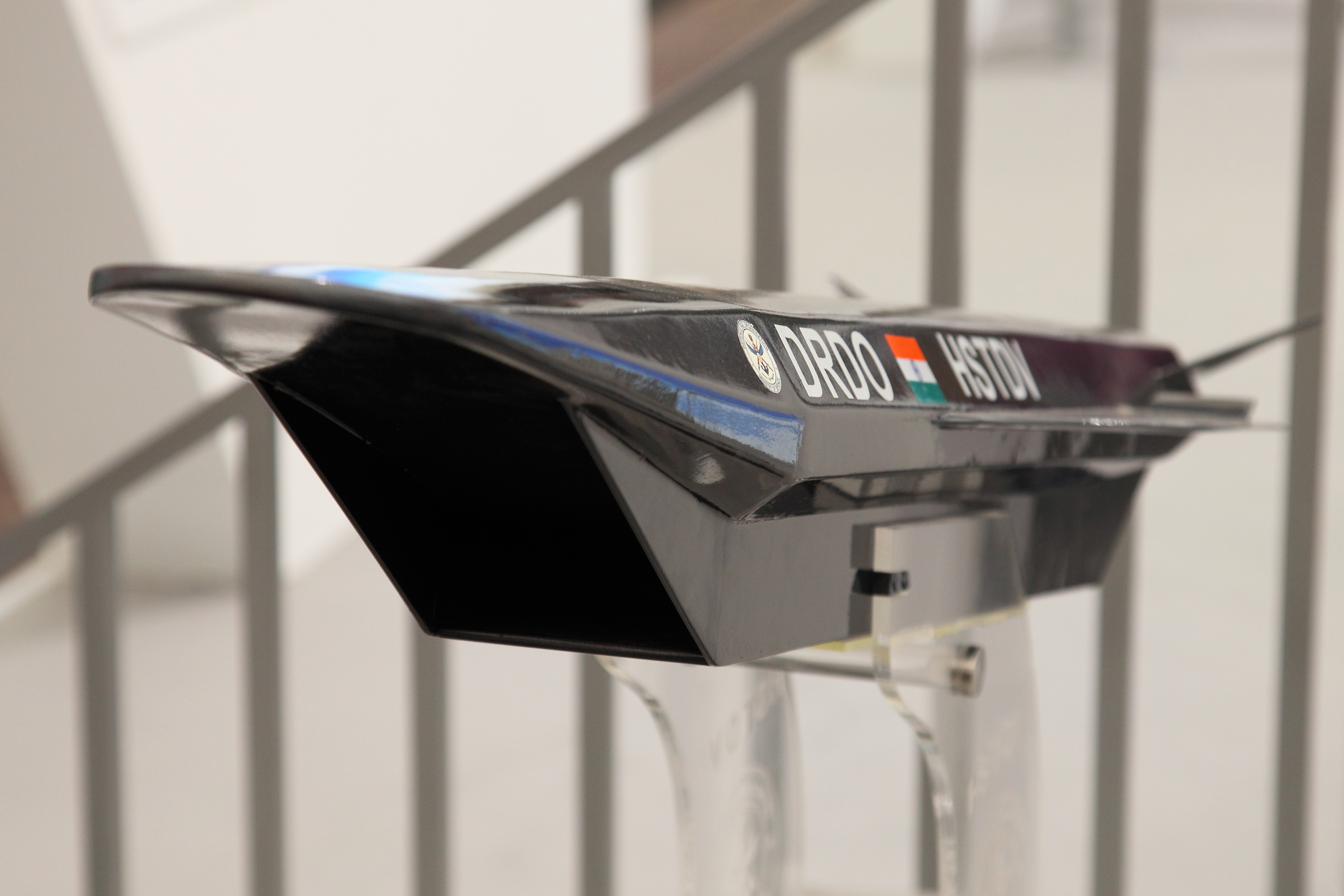
- HSTDV model displayed at the ILA Berlin Air Show ILA 2012

General information
- Type: Robotic flight demonstrator
- Designer: Defence Research and Development Organisation
- Status: Testing
- Primary user: Indian Armed Forces

History
- First flight: 12 June 2019
- Developed into: ET-LDHCM

The HSTDV is an unmanned scramjet demonstration aircraft for hypersonic flight. It is being developed as a carrier vehicle for hypersonic and long-range cruise missiles, and will have multiple civilian applications including the launching of small satellites at low cost. The HSTDV program is being run by the Defence Research and Development Organisation (DRDO).

== Introduction ==
India is pushing ahead with the development of ground and flight test hardware as part of an ambitious plan for a hypersonic cruise missile.

The Defence Research and Development Laboratory's Hypersonic Technology Demonstrator Vehicle (HSTDV) is intended to attain autonomous scramjet flight for 20 seconds, using a solid rocket launch booster. The research will also inform India's interest in reusable launch vehicles. The eventual target is to reach Mach 6 at an altitude of 32.5 km (20 miles).

Initial flight testing is aimed at validating the aerodynamics of the air vehicle, as well as its thermal properties and scramjet engine performance. A mock-up of the HSTDV was shown at the Aero India exhibition in Bengaluru in February (see photo), and S. Panneerselvam, the DRDO's project director, says engineers aim to begin flight testing a full-scale air-breathing model powered by a 1,300-lb.-thrust scramjet engine in the near future.

== Design and development ==
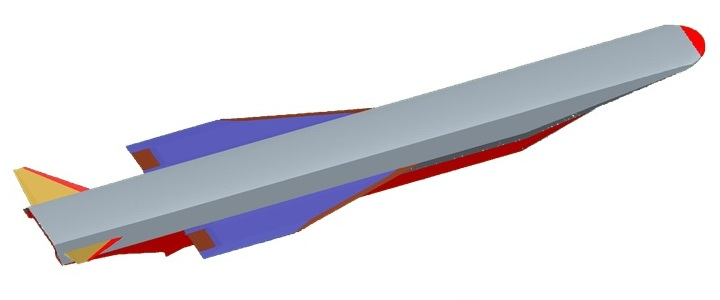
A render of HSTDV cruise vehicle.

The design for airframe attachment with the engine was completed in the year 2004.

In May 2008, Dr. Saraswat said:

The HSTDV project, through which we want to demonstrate the performance of a scram-jet engine at an altitude of 15 km to 20 km, is on. Under this project, we are developing a hypersonic vehicle that will be powered by a scram-jet engine. This is dual-use technology, which when developed, will have multiple civilian applications. It can be used for launching satellites at low cost. It will also be available for long-range cruise missiles of the future.

Israel has provided some assistance on the HSTDV program, including wind tunnel testing, as has Cranfield University of the U.K. An unnamed third country is helping as well. According to a report, Russia has provided critical help in the project. India's main defence-industrial partner is Russia, which has carried out considerable research into hypersonic propulsion.

The 1-metric-ton, 5.6-meter-long (18 ft) air vehicle under construction features a flattened octagonal cross section with mid-body stub-wings and raked tail fins and a 3.7-meter rectangular section air intake. The scramjet engine is located under the mid-body, with the aftbody serving as part of the exhaust nozzle. Development work on the engine is also in progress.

Two parallel fences in the forebody are meant to reduce spillage and increase thrust. Part span flaps are provided at the trailing edge of the wings for roll control. A deflectable nozzle cowl at the combustor end can deflect up to 25° to ensure satisfactory performance during power-off and power-on phases.

Surfaces of the airframe's bottom, wings and tail are made of titanium alloy, while aluminum alloy comprises the top surface. The inner surface of the double-wall engine is niobium alloy and the outer surface is nimonic alloy.

Due to technology denial of material for the scramjet engine, a new program was initiated and the materials were developed in-house. This led to self-sufficiency in the area and the scramjet engine was ground tested successfully for 20s instead of the initial 3s.

In the 12 June 2019 test, the cruise vehicle was mounted on an Agni-I solid rocket motor to take it to the required altitude. After the required altitude was reached and the Mach was achieved, the cruise vehicle was ejected out of the launch vehicle. Mid-air the scramjet engine was auto-ignited, and propelled the cruise vehicle at Mach 6. DRDO spent $30 million during design and development phase while $4.5 million was spent on HSTDV prototype development.

== Testing ==
=== Wind tunnel testing ===
A 1:16 scale model of the vehicle was tested at a hypersonic wind tunnel operated by Israel Aerospace Industries. The isolated intake has been tested at a trisonic wind tunnel at India's National Aerospace Laboratory (NAL) in Bangalore. During the lab testing the scramjet engine was tested twice for 20s. A total of five to six tests are required before the test flight. The test flight was expected to take place by the end of 2010.

In November 2010, DRDO officials told press that they were in the process of opening four state-of-the-art facilities inside as well as in the vicinity of Hyderabad at a cost of more than ₹10 billion (US$104 million) over the next five years. Reportedly, they will invest ₹3 to 4 billion (US$66 to 88 million) for setting up a much-needed hypersonic wind tunnel at Hyderabad's Missile Complex. The advanced Hypersonic Wind Tunnel (HWT) test facility was finally commissioned at Dr APJ Abdul Kalam Missile Complex on 20 December 2020.

The facility facilitate testing of various parameters of the Hypersonic Technology Development Vehicle (HSTDV), including engine performance.

"It is pivotal to test the [HSTDV] in the range of up to Mach 12. This will be a unique installation in India," Saraswat told AW&ST on 22 November 2010.

As of December 2011, the scientists had proved technologies for aerodynamics, aero-thermodynamics, engine and hot structures through design and ground testing. "Ahead of the launch, we will have to now focus on the mechanical and electrical integration, control and guidance system along with their packaging, checkout system, HILS (hardware in loop simulation) and launch readiness," sources said.

=== Flight testing ===
In 2016, it was announced that the vehicle will be tested by December 2016. In early 2019, the vehicle was cleared for tests and was expected to be tested in same year.

On 12 June 2019, it was tested from Abdul Kalam Island by the Defence Research and Development Organisation. With the scramjet engine, it can cruise at Mach 6. It was test-fired from Launch Complex-4 of Integrated Test Range (ITR) at the Abdul Kalam Island in the Balasore district of Odisha at 11:27 IST. According to some unconfirmed reports, the test was a partial success since, allegedly, the Agni-I ballistic carrier vehicle on which the HSTDV was to receive its altitude boost didn't complete the mission. This was supposedly due to ‘weight issues’. The rumours however, were unconfirmed. According to the official statement by the Ministry of Defence, “the missile was successfully launched” and the data collected will be analysed to “validate critical technologies”.

On 7 September 2020 DRDO successfully tested the scramjet powered Hypersonic Technology Demonstrator Vehicle (HSTDV). Cruise vehicle was launched at 11:03 IST from Integrated Test Range Launch Complex IV at Abdul Kalam Island atop a solid booster. At 30 km (98,000 ft) altitude payload fairing separated, followed by separation of HSTDV cruise vehicle, air-intake opening, fuel injection and auto-ignition. After sustaining hypersonic combustion for 20 seconds, cruise vehicle achieved velocity of nearly 2 km/s (Mach 5.9). A ship was also deployed in the Bay of Bengal to study the missile trajectory. The missile's scramjet engine performed in a "text book manner." This test flight validated aerodynamic configuration of vehicle, ignition and sustained combustion of scramjet engine at hypersonic flow, separation mechanisms and characterised thermo-structural materials. The HSTDV is set to serve as the building block for next-generation hypersonic cruise missiles.

=== Scramjet testing ===
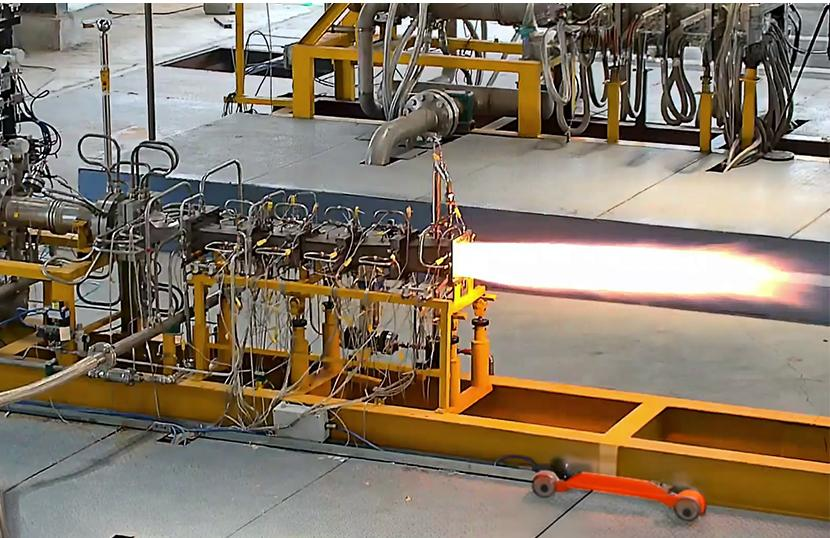
Active Cooled Scramjet Subscale Combustor ground testing in April 2025

The DRDL has developed multiple technologies for an Active Cooled Scramjet Combustor under the Hypersonic Cruise Missile Development Programme with the Department of Science and Technology and the private sector. The technologies include an improved ceramic thermal barrier coating (TBC), endothermic scramjet fuel, and a long-duration scramjet engine. A novel flame stabilization method was added to the scramjet combustor, which maintains a constant flame inside the combustor at air speeds greater than 1.5 km/s (5,400 km/h). In addition to improving cooling, the endothermic fuel shortens ignition times. With its high temperature resistance, the cutting-edge ceramic TBC can function above the melting point of steel. The Scramjet Connect Pipe Test (SCPT) Facility in Hyderabad to validate the technology was also designed and developed by the DRDL and the industry.

A 120-second ground test of an Active Cooled Scramjet Subscale Combustor for next-generation missiles was conducted by the DRDL at its SCPT facility on 21 January 2025. The test showed stable combustion and successful ignition. The second test of the subscale scramjet was conducted on 25 April 2025 for a longer duration of over 1,000 seconds in the Hyderabad facility. This validated the system's worthiness for a full scale flight worthy combustor testing.

The full scale actively cooled long duration Scramjet Engine was first tested on 9 January 2026 for a runtime of over 12 minutes or 700 seconds. The second test of the full-scale combustor was conducted on 9 May 2026 at the same facility for a duration of 1,200 seconds.

== Gallery ==
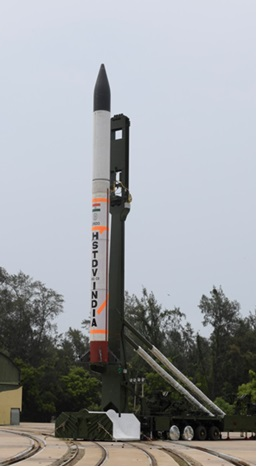
HSTDV cruise vehicle mounted atop a solid booster stage before launch.

Scramjet test flight of HSTDV cruise vehicle.

== See also ==
- Boeing X-51
- BrahMos-II
- ET-LDHCM
