= BrahMos-II =

Joint Russian-Indian hypersonic cruise missile

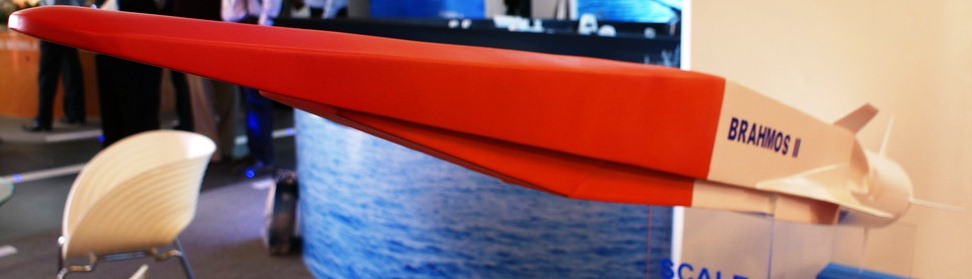
- A scaled down model of Brahmos-II at Aero India 2013
- Type: Hypersonic Cruise missile Air-launched cruise missile Anti-ship missile Land-attack missile Surface-to-surface missile
- Place of origin: India; Russia

Production history
- Designer: Defence Research and Development Organisation; NPO Mashinostroyenia
- Manufacturer: BrahMos Aerospace Limited
- Unit cost: $12.5 million (est.)

Specifications
- Engine: Scramjet
- Operational range: 1,500 km (930 mi)
- Maximum speed: Mach 8 (9,800 km/h; 6,100 mph; 2,700 m/s)
- Launch platform: Ship, submarine, aircraft and land-based mobile launchers.

BrahMos-II or BrahMos-2 or BrahMos Mark II is a hypersonic scramjet-propelled missile currently under joint development by India's Defence Research and Development Organisation and Russia's NPO Mashinostroyenia, which have together formed BrahMos Aerospace Private Limited. The BrahMos-II is expected to have a range of 1,500 kilometres (930 mi; 810 nmi) and a speed of Mach 8. During the cruise stage of flight, the missile will be propelled by a scramjet airbreathing jet engine. Other details, including production cost and physical dimensions of the missile, are yet to be published.

The planned operational range of the BrahMos-II had initially been restricted to 290 kilometres as Russia is a signatory to the Missile Technology Control Regime (MTCR), which prohibits it from helping other countries develop missiles with ranges above 300 kilometres (190 mi; 160 nmi). However, subsequent to India becoming a MTCR signatory in 2014, the parameters for Brahmos 2 will get enhanced. Its top speed will be double that of the current BrahMos-I, and it has been described as the fastest cruise missile in the world.

Testing was planned to start in 2020 has been delayed but is now expected to be ready by 2026 or 2027 for flight testing. The missile is expected to be weighted around 1.33 tonnes, about half the weight of the current air-launched missile at 2.65 tonnes. With this advantage of light weight and "is a sleeker air launched missile than the current variant, and is in advanced stages of development. It should be ready for flight testing in a year or so,” a defence official said, adding it would be ready for production and induction in one to two years after that. Being much lighter, the BrahMos-NG can be mounted on other fighters, including the indigenous Light Combat Aircraft (LCA) Tejas.

Fourth-generation multi-purpose Russian Naval destroyers (Project 21956) are also likely to be equipped with the BrahMos II.

BrahMos Aerospace named the missile BrahMos-II (K) in honour of the former President of India, APJ Abdul Kalam.

The CEO of the joint Indo-Russian BrahMos programme, Atul Rane, stated in 2022, a future BrahMos-II will likely have similar characteristics to the 3M22 Zircon.

According to reports published in April 2023, India has requested Russia for the transfer of technology (ToT) for the Russian 3M22 Zircon hypersonic cruise missile, upon which the BrahMos-II (K) will be based.

== Testing ==
DRDO reportedly tested the scramjet combustor of Brahmos-II for over 1,000 seconds in April 2025. BrahMos-II variant was again tested in May 2025 in the Bay of Bengal where it achieved a range of 800 kilometres.

== See also ==
- DRDO HSTDV
- Zircon maneuvering hypersonic missile
- Shaurya (missile)
- Brahmos
