= Dr. A. P. J. Abdul Kalam Missile Complex =

Indian military research center

Dr APJ Abdul Kalam Missile Complex is a military missile research center in Hyderabad, India.

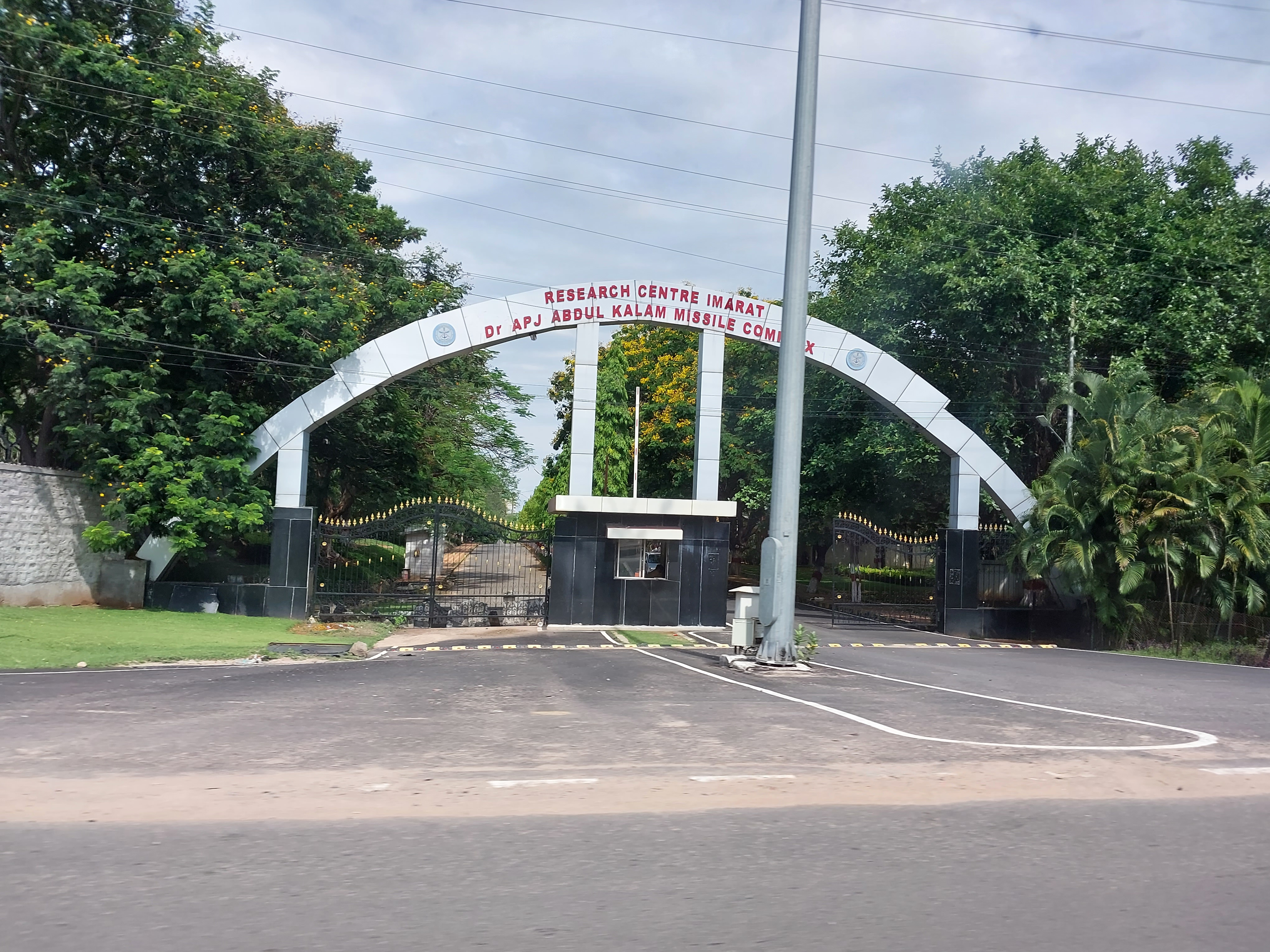
Dr APJ Abdul Kalam Missile Complex main gate

== Laboratories ==
The complex has following three laboratories:

- Advanced Systems Laboratory (ASL):
  Conducts research and development on motors, jet vanes and structures for launch vehicles and missiles, primarily known for contributions to Agni Missiles.
- Defence Research and Development Laboratory (DRDL):
  famous for its contributions to Integrated Guided Missile Development Programme (IGMDP).
- Research Centre Imarat (RCI):
  A missile Avionics Laboratory founded by Dr A. P. J. Abdul Kalam.

== History ==
Manohar Parrikar, the then Defence Minister of India, on 15 October 2015 renamed DRDO Missile Complex at Hyderabad into Dr. APJ Abdul Kalam Missile Complex, after Dr. A. P. J. Abdul Kalam, the former President of India also regarded as the Missile Man of India.

== See also ==
- Guided missiles of India
- Indian Human Spaceflight Programme
- Indian Armed Forces
- Indian weapons of mass destruction
