= Conventional weapon =

Weapons whose ability to damage comes from the explosive or incendiary release of energy

Conventional weapons or conventional arms are weapons whose damaging impact comes from kinetic, incendiary, or explosive energy. They stand in contrast to weapons of mass destruction (e.g., nuclear, biological, radiological, and chemical weapons).

== Proscription ==
Conventional weapons include small arms, defensive shields, light weapons, booby trap, sea and land mines, as well as bombs, shells, rockets, missiles, and cluster munitions. These weapons use explosive material based on chemical energy, as opposed to nuclear energy in nuclear weapons. Conventional weapons are also contrasted with weapons of mass destruction and improvised weapons.

The Geneva Conventions govern the acceptable use of conventional weapons in war. Certain weapons are regulated or prohibited under the United Nations Convention on Certain Conventional Weapons. Others are prohibited under the Convention on Cluster Munitions, the Ottawa Treaty (also known as the Mine Ban Treaty), and Arms Trade Treaty.
