= GASL =

GASL can refer to:

- General Applied Science Laboratory, purchased by Alliant Techsystems in 2003
- German Academy of Sciences Leopoldina, in German Deutsche Akademie der Naturforscher Leopoldina
- German-American Soccer League, historic name of Cosmopolitan Soccer League
- German acronym for Gesellschaft der Arno-Schmidt-Leser, society for author Arno Schmidt
