= Boeing Small Launch Vehicle =

The Boeing Small Launch Vehicle, or SLV, is an air-launched three-stage-to-orbit launch vehicle concept aimed to launch small payloads of 100 pounds (45 kg) into low Earth orbit. The program is proposed to drive down launch costs for small satellites as low as US$300,000 per launch ($7,000/kg) and could be fielded by 2020.

== History ==
In July 2012, DARPA awarded Boeing a US$4.5 million contract to further refine the system concept as a part of the DARPA ALASA program.

== Description ==
The first stage of the three-stage launcher would be an air-launched supersonic aircraft accelerating to a speed of Mach 4.5 (5,510 km/h; 3,430 mph) at 61,000 feet (19,000 m), while the second stage would be a hypersonic waverider aircraft which would accelerate the vehicle to Mach 10 (12,300 km/h; 7,610 mph) at an altitude of 95,000 feet (29,000 m). Both of the first two stages would be reusable to reduce launch cost, and both stages would carry only fuel, and obtain their oxygen for combustion from the Earth's atmosphere. The third stage would be powered by a rocket, roughly 16 feet (4.9 m) long, to complete the acceleration of the 21 by 38 inches (53 cm × 97 cm) payload to orbital velocity. The carrier aircraft is projected to be a Scaled Composites White Knight Two.

=== Specifications ===
- First-stage: 38 feet (12 m) length, 19 feet (5.8 m) wingspan, supersonic aircraft
- Second-stage: 37 feet (11 m) in length, 15.3 feet (4.7 m) wingspan, hypersonic aircraft; "Overall airframe construction would be of graphite-epoxy, with an integral conformal liquid methane tank to supply the vehicle’s circular combustion scramjet. Thermal protection would be a ceramic matrix composite material."
- Third-stage: 2 feet (0.61 m) diameter, 16.4 feet (5.0 m) long, solid propellant rocket.
- Payload: 21 inches (0.53 m) diameter, 38 inches (0.97 m) long payload bay, carrying up to 100 pounds (45 kg) to low Earth orbit.

== See also ==
- X-51 WaveRider hypersonic test vehicle flown at Mach 5.1 (5,400 km/h; 3,400 mph) at 60,000 feet (18,000 m) on a single test mission in May 2013.
