= FASTT =

FASTT may stand for:

- FAStT Series, an IBM Storage product line
- Freeflight Atmospheric Scramjet Test Technique, used in Scramjet programs
- Flagstaff Astrometric Scanning Transit Telescope, a Meridian circle
