= Scramjet programs =

Programs developing supersonic combustion ramjets

Scramjet programs refers to research and testing programs for the development of supersonic combustion ramjets, known as scramjets. This list provides a short overview of national and international collaborations, and civilian and military programs. The USA, Russia, India, and China (2014), have succeeded at developing scramjet technologies.

== USA ==
=== X-15 ===
When the second X-15 aircraft (piloted by John B. McKay) crashed on flight 74, it was damaged but survived well enough to be rebuilt. North American Aviation rebuilt it as the X-15-A2. Among other things, one of the changes was provisions for a dummy scramjet to test if wind tunnel testing was correct. Unfortunately, on the final flight of the X-15-A2 (flight 188), the shock waves sent out by the scramjet at Mach 6.7 caused extremely intense heating of over 2,700 °F (1,480 °C). This then drilled into the ventral fin and melted large holes. The plane survived but never flew again. Test data were limited due to the limited flights of the scramjet before the X-15-A2 and the X-15 project on the whole were cancelled.^{1}

=== SCRAM ===
From 1962–1978, the Johns Hopkins Applied Physics Laboratory (APL) undertook a classified program (declassified in 1993) to develop a family of missiles called SCRAM^{8} (Supersonic Combustion RAmjet Missile). They were intended to fit on to the Talos MK12 launcher system or the Terrier MK10 launcher. Testing of engine modules in a direct-connect, and a free-jet, facility took place at a variety of Mach numbers and pressures (altitudes). These included Mach 4 (24,000 ft), Mach 5.3 (46,000 ft), Mach 7.8 (67,000 ft) and Mach 10 (88,000 ft). Tests showed that acceptable combustion efficiency was only achieved with over 20% pentaborane (B_{5}H_{9}) in MCPD (C_{12}H_{16}). Tests with pure pentaborane (HiCal) showed that a net thrust could be achieved at Mach 7. An accelerative capability equivalent to 11g was observed for Mach 5 flight at sea level.

=== NASP ===
In 1986 United States president Ronald Reagan announced the National Aerospace Plane (NASP) program, intended to develop two X-30 aircraft capable of single stage to orbit (SSTO), as well as horizontal takeoff and landing from conventional runways. The aircraft was to be a hydrogen fuelled air-breathing space plane, with a low speed accelerator system to bring the aircraft up to Mach 3, where the main dual-mode scramjet engines (ramjet/scramjet) would take over. At the edge of the atmosphere, a rocket was to take over and provide the final energy for orbital insertion. It was based on a classified DARPA research program called Copper Canyon. This research program suggested that Mach 25 might be possible. As the program proceeded it became clear that Mach 17 was probably the limit, whilst the weight penalty and complexity of the skin heat exchanger and other propulsion systems was going to be substantial. The program was established by the secretary of defence in 1985, and was funded to the end of FY1994, when the decision was made that the 15 billion dollars required to build the two X-30 test craft were excessive.

Although the more visible parts of the program were cancelled, NASP provided a large amount of basic research, which flowed into following projects. For example, The NASP reaction model^{7} for hydrogen combustion in air (31 reactions, 16 species), is still extensively used where computational power is sufficient not to have to use reduced reaction models.

=== GASL projectile ===
At a test facility at Arnold Air Force Base in the U.S. state of Tennessee, the General Applied Science Laboratory (GASL) fired a projectile equipped with a hydrocarbon-powered scramjet engine from a large gun. On July 26, 2001, the four inch (100 mm) wide projectile covered a distance of 260 feet (79 m) in 30 milliseconds (roughly 5,900 mph or 9,500 km/h). The projectile is supposedly a model for a missile design. Many do not consider this to be a scramjet "flight," as the test took place near ground level. However, the test environment was described as being very realistic.

=== Hyper-X ===
The $250 million NASA Langley Hyper-X X-43A effort was an outgrowth of the canceled National Aerospace Plane (NASP) program on which NASA was a collaborator. Rather than developing and flying a large, expensive spaceplane with orbital capability, Hyper-X flew small test vehicles to demonstrate hydrogen-fueled scramjet engines. NASA worked with contractors Boeing, Microcraft, and the General Applied Science Laboratory (GASL) on the project.

NASA's Hyper-X program is the successor to the National Aerospace Plane (NASP) program which was cancelled in November 1994. This program involves flight testing through the construction of the X-43 vehicles. NASA first successfully flew its X-43A scramjet test vehicle on March 27, 2004 (an earlier test, on June 2, 2001, went out of control and had to be destroyed). Unlike the University of Queensland's vehicle, it took a horizontal trajectory. After it separated from its mother craft and booster, it briefly achieved a speed of 5,000 miles per hour (8,000 km/h), the equivalent of Mach 7, easily breaking the previous speed record for level flight of an air-breathing vehicle. Its engines ran for eleven seconds, and in that time it covered a distance of 15 miles (24 km). The Guinness Book of Records certified the X-43A's flight as the current Aircraft Speed Record holder on 30 August 2004. The third X-43 flight set a new speed record of 6,600 mph (10,620 km/h), nearly Mach 10 on 16 November 2004. It was boosted by a modified Pegasus rocket which was launched from a Boeing B-52 at 13,157 meters (43,166 ft). After a free flight where the scramjet operated for about ten seconds the craft made a planned crash into the Pacific Ocean off the coast of southern California. The X-43A craft were designed to crash into the ocean without recovery. Duct geometry and performance of the X-43 are classified.

The NASA Langley, Marshall, and Glenn Centers are now all heavily engaged in hypersonic propulsion studies. The Glenn Center is taking leadership on a Mach 4 turbine engine of interest to the USAF. As for the X-43A Hyper-X, three follow-on projects are now under consideration:

X-43B: A scaled-up version of the X-43A, to be powered by the Integrated Systems Test of an Air-Breathing Rocket (ISTAR) engine. ISTAR will use a hydrocarbon-based liquid-rocket mode for initial boost, a ramjet mode for speeds above Mach 2.5, and a scramjet mode for speeds above Mach 5 to take it to maximum speeds of at least Mach 7. A version intended for space launch could then return to rocket mode for final boost into space. ISTAR is based on a proprietary Aerojet design called a "strutjet", which is currently undergoing wind-tunnel testing. NASA's Marshall Space Propulsion Center has introduced an Integrated Systems Test of the Air-Breathing Rocket (ISTAR) program, prompting Pratt & Whitney, Aerojet, and Rocketdyne to join forces for development.

X-43C: NASA is in discussions with the Air Force on development of a variant of the X-43A that would use the HyTECH hydrocarbon-fueled scramjet engine. The US Air Force and Pratt and Whitney have cooperated on the Hypersonic Technology (HyTECH) scramjet engine, which has now been demonstrated in a wind-tunnel environment.

While most scramjet designs to date have used hydrogen fuel, HyTech runs on conventional kerosene-type hydrocarbon fuels, which are much more practical for support of operational vehicles. A full-scale engine is now being built, which will use its own fuel for cooling. Using fuel for engine cooling is nothing new, but the cooling system will also act as a chemical reactor, breaking long-chain hydrocarbons down into short-chain hydrocarbons that burn more rapidly.

X-43D: A version of the X-43A with a hydrogen-powered scramjet engine with a maximum speed of Mach 15.

=== FASST ===
On December 10, 2005, Alliant Techsystems (ATK) successfully flight-tested an air-breathing, liquid JP-10 (hydrocarbon) fuelled scramjet-powered free-flight vehicle from NASA's Wallops Flight Facility, Wallops Island, Virginia. The flight test was conducted under the Defense Advanced Research Projects Agency (DARPA)/ Office of Naval Research (ONR) Freeflight Atmospheric Scramjet Test Technique (FASTT) project. This latest flight was a culmination of a three-year, three-flight program to successfully demonstrate the feasibility of using ground-launched sounding rockets as a low-cost approach to hypersonic flight testing, and represents the world's first flight test of an air-breathing, scramjet-powered vehicle using hydrocarbon fuel.

Begun in late 2002, the FASTT project entailed the design and fabrication of three flight vehicles and a ground test engine rig to undergo wind tunnel testing. The first and second payloads were dubbed surrogate payload vehicles and matched closely the scramjet flight article, but lacked the internal flowpath and fuel system. They were designed as test rounds to validate vehicle subsystems, such as booster stack combination performance, fin sets, payload deployment mechanism, telemetry and trackability, and inlet shroud, before flight testing the more complicated scramjet flowpath, which was to undergo proof-of-concept testing in a wind tunnel prior to flight testing.

The first surrogate vehicle, SPV1, was launched aboard an unguided Terrier/Improved Orion two-stage solid rocket motor stack from Wallops Island on October 18, 2003, approximately 12 months after program initiation. This had the exact outer mold line of the eventual shrouded scramjet payload and contained full onboard instrumentation and telemetry suites. The vehicle was boosted to approximately 4,600 ft/s (1,400 m/s) and 52,000 ft (16,000 m) altitude, where it was deployed to free-flight, deployed its shroud at high dynamic pressure, and flew an un-powered trajectory to splashdown. All on-board subsystems worked flawlessly. The boost stage however inserted the payload at lower than desired flight speed, altitude, and flight path angle. The second surrogate vehicle, SPV2 was launched aboard the identical booster stack from Wallops Island on April 16, 2004, approximately six months after the first launch. After making slight trajectory corrections to account for launch rail effects, higher than anticipated drag, and actual booster performance, the payload was inserted nominally above 5,200 ft/s (1,600 m/s) and 61,000 ft (19,000 m) altitude. The full complement of subsystems were again proven out in flight on this successful flight test. The results of these two flight tests are summarized in a technical paper AIAA-2005-3297, presented at the 13th International Space Planes and Hypersonics Systems and Technologies Conference (see )in Capua, Italy.

The ground test engine hardware was fabricated over 18 months and underwent a four-month engine validation testing program in the ATK GASL freejet wind tunnel complex Leg 6, located in Ronkonkoma, New York. Ignition, fuel throttling, and engine operation were wrung out over a range of expected flight conditions. After a delay of two months to modify flight hardware based on ground test findings, the first powered vehicle, FFV1, was launched without incident, propelled to speeds of 5,300 ft/s (1,600 m/s) at 63,000 ft (19,000 m) altitude, roughly Mach 5.5. Over 140 inlet, combustor, and vehicle outer mold line pressure, temperatures, and vehicle accelerations as well as fuel pressure, timing feedback, and power systems monitoring were recorded. The vehicle executed the prescribed test sequences flawlessly for 15 seconds, before continuing on to splashdown into the Atlantic Ocean. Further details can be found in the technical paper AIAA-2006-8119, presented at the 14th International Space Planes and Hypersonics Systems and Technologies Conference, in Canberra, Australia.

Alliant Techsystems Inc. (ATK) GASL Division led the contractor team for the FASTT project, developed and integrated the scramjet vehicle, and acted as mission managers for the three flights. Launch vehicle integration and processing was performed by Rocket Support Services (formerly DTI Associates), Glen Burnie, MD; the flight shroud was developed by Systima Technologies, Inc., Bothell, Washington; electrical systems, telemetry and instrumentation was handled by the NASA Sounding Rocket Office Contract (NSROC); flight test support was provided by the NASA Wallops Flight Facility; and technical support was provided by the Johns Hopkins Applied Physics Laboratory, Baltimore, MD. GASL previously built and integrated the engine flowpaths and fuel systems for the three X-43A flight vehicles, working closely with air framer and systems integrator Boeing, NASA Langley, and NASA Dryden on the successful Hyper-X Program.

=== HyFly ===
To be completed

=== Hy-V ===
Hy-V is a scramjet experiment to obtain and compare ground test and flight test supersonic combustion data. The general goal of the project is to validate wind tunnel test results that will eventually be used to develop computational codes. The primary investigators are the University of Virginia, Virginia Tech, and Alliant Techsystems, and the test will be launched on a Terrier-Orion sounding rocket from NASA's Wallops Island site.

=== Boeing X-51 ===
The Boeing X-51 is a scramjet demonstration aircraft for hypersonic (Mach 7, around 8,050 km/h) flight testing. The X-51 WaveRider program is a consortium of the US Air Force, DARPA, NASA, Boeing and Pratt & Whitney Rocketdyne. The program is managed by the Propulsion Directorate within the United States Air Force Research Laboratory (AFRL).

The X-51 is a descendant of earlier efforts including the Advanced Rapid Response Missile Demonstrator and the liquid hydrocarbon-fuelled scramjet engine developed under the USAF's HyTech program. The first free-flight of the X-51 took place in May 2010. On 1 May 2013, the X-51 performed its first fully successful flight test, flying for 240 seconds until running out of fuel; this test was the longest air-breathing hypersonic flight. This test signified the completion of the program.

=== HAWC ===
The Hypersonic Air-breathing Weapon Concept (HAWC, pronounced Hawk) is a scramjet powered air-launched hypersonic cruise missile without a warhead that is being developed by DARPA and uses its own kinetic energy upon impact to destroy the target. It was first successfully tested in September 2021. Another successful test was carried out in mid-March 2022 amid the Russian invasion of Ukraine but further details were kept secret to avoid escalating tensions with Russia only to be leaked by an unnamed Pentagon official in early April. The missile was successfully launched from a B-52 strategic bomber off the west coast and flew above 65,000 feet for more than 300 miles (483 km).

Follow-on tactical range Hypersonic Attack Cruise Missile (HACM) will be built by Raytheon Technologies and will use a Northrop Grumman scramjet.

=== Mayhem ===
Leidos was awarded a contract to develop the unmanned scramjet-powered Mayhem (Expendable Hypersonic Multi-mission ISR (intelligence, surveillance, and reconnaissance) and Strike program) hypersonic technology demonstrator, in December 2022.

== Australia ==
=== HyShot ===
On July 30, 2002, the University of Queensland's HyShot team (and international partners) conducted the first-ever successful test flight of a scramjet.

The team took a unique approach to the problem of accelerating the engine to the necessary speed by using a Terrier-Orion sounding rocket to take the aircraft up on a parabolic trajectory to an altitude of 314 km. As the craft re-entered the atmosphere, it dropped to a speed of Mach 7.6. The scramjet engine then started, and it flew at about Mach 7.6 for 6 seconds. . This was achieved on a lean budget of just A$1.5 million (US$1.1 million), a tiny fraction of NASA's US$250 million to develop the X-43A. This involved many of the same researchers involved in the University of Queensland report in 1995 of the first development of a scramjet that achieved more thrust than drag^{2}.

On Saturday, March 25, 2006, researchers at the University of Queensland conducted another successful test flight of a HyShot Scramjet at the Woomera Test Range in South Australia. The Hyshot III with its £1,200,000 engine made an apparently successful flight (and planned crash landing) reaching in the order of 7.6 Mach.

NASA has partially explained the tremendous difference in cost between the two projects by pointing out that the American vehicle has an engine fully incorporated into an airframe with a full complement of flight control surfaces available.

In the second HyShot mission, no net thrust was achieved. (The thrust was less than the drag.)

The HyShot program currently consists of the following tests:

- HyShot 1 - UQ 2-D scramjet. Failed launch due to rocket fin puncture by a rock on the landing pad.
- HyShot 2 - UQ 2-D scramjet. Successful, July 30, 2002
- HyShot 3-7 - NASA tests. Cancelled after announcement of manned Mars mission.
- HyShot 8 (Now known as HyShot III) - QinetiQ 4-chamber scramjet. Successful, March 25, 2006.
- HyShot 9 (Now known as HyShot IV) - UQ 2D scramjet with JAXA hypermixer. Successful, March 30, 2006.
- HyShot 10 - HyCAUSE - DSTO scramjet. Successful June 15, 2007.

Sponsorship for the HyShot Flight Program was obtained from the University of Queensland, Astrotech Space Operations, Defence Evaluation and Research Agency (DERA (now Qinetiq), UK), National Aeronautics and Space Agency (NASA, USA), Defence, Science and Technology Organisation (DSTO, Australia), Dept. of Defence (Australia), Dept. of Industry Science and Resources (Australia), the German Aerospace Centre (DLR, Germany), Seoul National University (Korea), the Australian Research Council, Australian Space Research Institute (ASRI), Alesi Technologies (Australia), National Aerospace Laboratories (NAL, Japan), NQEA (Australia), Australian Research and Development Unit (ARDU, Australia), the Air Force Office of Scientific Research (AFOSR, USA) and Luxfer, Australia.

=== HIFiRE ===
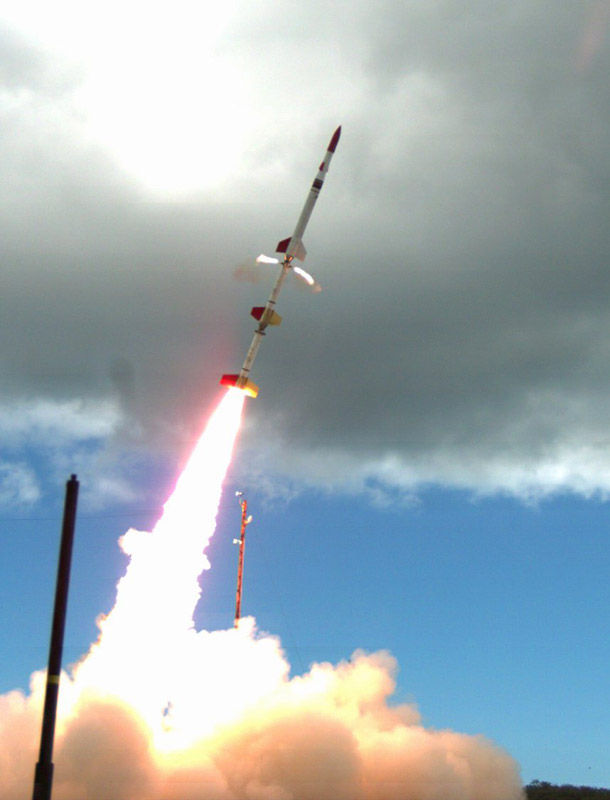
Terrier Terrier Oriole - HiFire-2

Hypersonic International Flight Research and Experimentation (HIFiRE) is a joint program of the US Department of Defense and Australian DST Group. The "purpose of this program is to investigate fundamental hypersonic phenomena and accelerate the development of aerospace vehicle technologies deemed critical to long range precision strike" by using an "affordable, accessible, prototype experimentation strategy".

- HIFiRE 0 May 7, 2009 - First HIFiRE hypersonic test flight
- HIFiRE 1 March 22, 2010 - Axisymmetric conical boundary layer transition
- HIFiRE 2 May 1, 2012 - Accelerating velocity profile of an hydrocarbon-fueled axisymmetric scramjet
- HIFiRE 3 Sept 13, 2012 - Radical farming of an hydrogen-fueled axisymmetric scramjet
- HIFiRE 4 June 30, 2017 - Aerodynamic performance of a hypersonic waverider
- HIFiRE 5 April 23, 2012 - Elliptical forebody boundary layer transition (failed because reaching only Mach 3)
- HIFiRE 5b May 18, 2016 - Elliptical forebody boundary layer transition
- HiFIRE 6 Cancelled ? - Adaptive flight control of an hypersonic vehicle
- HIFiRE 7 March 30, 2015 - Free flight of an hydrocarbon fueled scramjet with REST inlet
- HIFiRE 8 Cancelled ? - Sustained flight of an hypersonic vehicle integrating an hydrocarbon fueled scramjet with REST inlet

In 2012 the HIFiRE program was recognized with the prestigious von Karman Award by the International Congress of the Aeronautical Sciences.

== Brazil ==
The 14-X is a Brazilian hypersonic aircraft, named in tribute to the 14-bis of Alberto Santos-Dumont. This aircraft is equipped with a scramjet engine, which is integrated into the fuselage and has no moving parts. The operating principle is that, during flight, the air is compressed by the geometry and speed of the vehicle and directed to the engine at the bottom of the aircraft. Hydrogen is used as the fuel. The vehicle utilize the “Waverider” concept and made the first test flight of engine in December 2021 in 'Operação Cruzeiro' and on its flight, the engine accelerated to a speed greater than Mach 6 at an altitude of more than 30 km and followed the planned trajectory, reaching its apogee at 160 km.

== China ==
In August 2015, it was reported that a Chinese researcher had been awarded for the successful development and test flight of a new scramjet engine, the first of its kind in China. This would make China the fourth country in the world, after Australia (2002), Russia and the United States, to have successfully test flown a scramjet. It was later revealed that the first flight of a Waverider-like scramjet-powered vehicle occurred in 2011, with flight tests completed by 2014.

A new near-hypersonic drone, with a variable-cycle turbo-ramjet engine, has also been flown. It is reportedly the fastest air-breathing recoverable vehicle in the world.

== France ==
Several scramjet designs are now under investigation. One of these options or a combination of them will be selected by ONERA, the French aerospace research agency, with the EADS conglomerate providing technical backup. The notional immediate goal of the study is to produce a hypersonic air-to-surface missile named "Promethee", which would be about 6 metres (20 ft) long and weigh 1,700 kilograms (3,700 lb).

ASN4G (Air-Sol Nucléaire de 4e Génération) (France) , will be an air-launched scramjet-powered hypersonic cruise missile and replace ASMP-A.

== Germany ==
The Deutsche Forschungsgemeinschaft has founded Research Training Group 1095 . Research purposes are the aero-thermodynamic design and development of a scramjet demonstrator. There is no official name for the demonstrator yet. The project includes basic research to gain a better understanding of supersonic fuel mixing and combustion, aerodynamic effects, material sciences and issues in system design. The project involves the University of Stuttgart, Technical University of Munich, RWTH Aachen and the German Aerospace Center.

== India ==
- Indian Space Research Organisation (ISRO) designed and ground-tested a scramjet in 2005. A press release stated that stable supersonic combustion was demonstrated in ground testing for nearly seven seconds with an inlet Mach number of six.
- In 2010, a flight test of Advanced Technology Vehicle (ATV-D01) with a passive scramjet engine combustor module was conducted. It was a suborbital ballistic trajectory based experiment using a two-stage RH-560 sounding rocket.
- The HSTDV is a technology demonstrator under development by the DRDO. It has been ground-tested at hypersonic speeds for 20 seconds.
- On August 28, 2016, ISRO successfully flight tested the Scramjet engine in Advanced Technology Vehicle (ATV-D02). It is the second scramjet flight test of VSSC-ISRO.
- On June 12, 2019, India conducted the maiden flight test of its indigenously developed unmanned scramjet demonstration aircraft for hypersonic speed flight from a base from Abdul Kalam Island in the Bay of Bengal at about 11.25 am. The aircraft is called the Hypersonic Technology Demonstrator Vehicle. The trial was carried out by the Defence Research and Development Organisation. The aircraft forms an important component of the country's programme for development of a Hypersonic Cruise missile system.
- ISRO is also planning to perform a (SPEX) Scramjet Propulsion Experiment for their RLV-TD programme which is focused on reusability of launch vehicle. ISRO has already performed maiden testing of the vehicle on 23 May 2016.

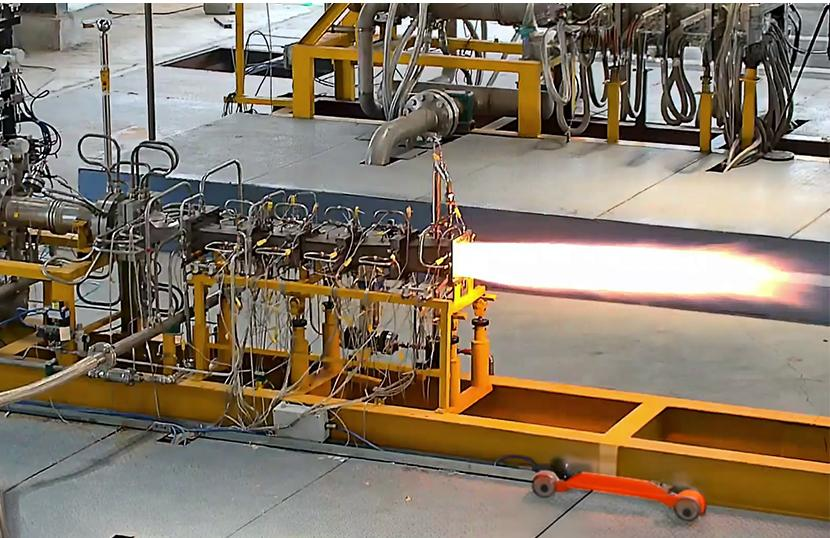
Active Cooled Scramjet Subscale Combustor ground testing in April 2025

The DRDL has developed multiple technologies for an Active Cooled Scramjet Combustor under the Hypersonic Cruise Missile Development Programme with the Department of Science and Technology and the private sector. The technologies include an improved ceramic thermal barrier coating (TBC), endothermic scramjet fuel, and a long-duration scramjet engine. A novel flame stabilization method was added to the scramjet combustor, which maintains a constant flame inside the combustor at air speeds greater than 1.5 km/s (5,400 km/h). In addition to improving cooling, the endothermic fuel shortens ignition times. With its high temperature resistance, the cutting-edge ceramic TBC can function above the melting point of steel. The Scramjet Connect Pipe Test (SCPT) Facility in Hyderabad to validate the technology was also designed and developed by the DRDL and the industry.

A 120-second ground test of an Active Cooled Scramjet Subscale Combustor for next-generation missiles was conducted by the DRDL at its SCPT facility on 21 January 2025. The test showed stable combustion and successful ignition. The second test of the subscale scramjet was conducted on 25 April 2025 for a longer duration of over 1,000 seconds in the Hyderabad facility. This validated the system's worthiness for a full scale flight worthy combustor testing.

The full scale actively cooled long duration Scramjet Engine was first tested on 9 January 2026 for a runtime of over 12 minutes or 700 seconds. The second test of the full-scale combustor was conducted on 9 May 2026 at the same facility for a duration of 1,200 seconds.

== Russia ==
The first working scramjet in the world "GLL Kholod" flew on 28 November 1991, reaching a speed of Mach 5.8. However, the collapse of the Soviet Union stopped the funding of the project.

After NASA's NASP program was cut, American scientists began to look at adopting available Russian technology as a less expensive alternative to developing hypersonic flight. On November 17, 1992, Russian scientists with some additional French support successfully launched a scramjet engine named "Kholod" in Kazakhstan^{6}. From 1994 to 1998 NASA worked with the Russian Central Institute of Aviation Motors (CIAM) to test a dual-mode scramjet engine and transfer technology and experience to the West. Four tests took place, reaching Mach numbers of 5.5, 5.35, 5.8, and 6.5. The final test took place aboard a modified SA-5 surface-to-air missile launched from the Sary Shagan test range in the Republic of Kazakhstan on 12 February 1998. According to CIAM telemetry data, the first ignition attempt of the scramjet was unsuccessful, but after 10 seconds the engine was started and the experimental system flew 77s with good performance, up until the planned SA-5 missile self-destruction (according to NASA, no net thrust was achieved).

Some sources in the Russian military have said that a hypersonic (Mach 10 to Mach 15) maneuverable ICBM warhead was tested.

The new "GLL Igla" system was expected to fly in 2009.

The 3M22 Zircon is a scramjet powered maneuvering anti-ship hypersonic cruise missile developed by Russia.

== See also ==
- HOTOL
- Jet engine
- Single-stage-to-orbit
- Skylon (spacecraft)

== Notes ==
- ^1Thompson, Milton O. "At the Edge of Space". Smithsonian Institution, Washington. 1992.
- ^2 Paull, A., Stalker, R.J., Mee, D.J. "Experiments on supersonic combustion ramjet propulsion in a shock tunnel", Journal of Fluid Mechanics 296: 156–183, 1995.
- ^3 Kors, D.L. "Design considerations for combined air breathing-rocket propulsion systems.", AIAA Paper No. 90-5216, 1990.
- ^4 Varvill, R., Bond, A. "A Comparison of Propulsion Concepts for SSTO Reusable Launchers", Journal of the British Interplanetary Society, Vol 56, pp 108–117, 2003. Figure 8.
- ^5 Varvill, R., Bond, A. "A Comparison of Propulsion Concepts for SSTO Reusable Launchers", Journal of the British Interplanetary Society, Vol 56, pp 108–117, 2003. Figure 7.
- ^6 Voland, R.T., Auslender, A.H., Smart, M.K., Roudakov, A.S., Semenov, V.L., Kopchenov, V. "CIAM/NASA Mach 6.5 scramjet flight and ground test", AIAA-99-4848.
- ^7 Oldenborg R. et al. "Hypersonic Combustion Kinetics: Status Report of the Rate Constant Committee, NASP High-Speed Propulsion Technology Team" NASP Technical Memorandum 1107, May 1990.
- ^8 Billig, FS "SCRAM-A Supersonic Combustion Ramjet Missile", AIAA paper 93–2329, 1993.
