= Kholod =

Soviet hypersonic rocket project

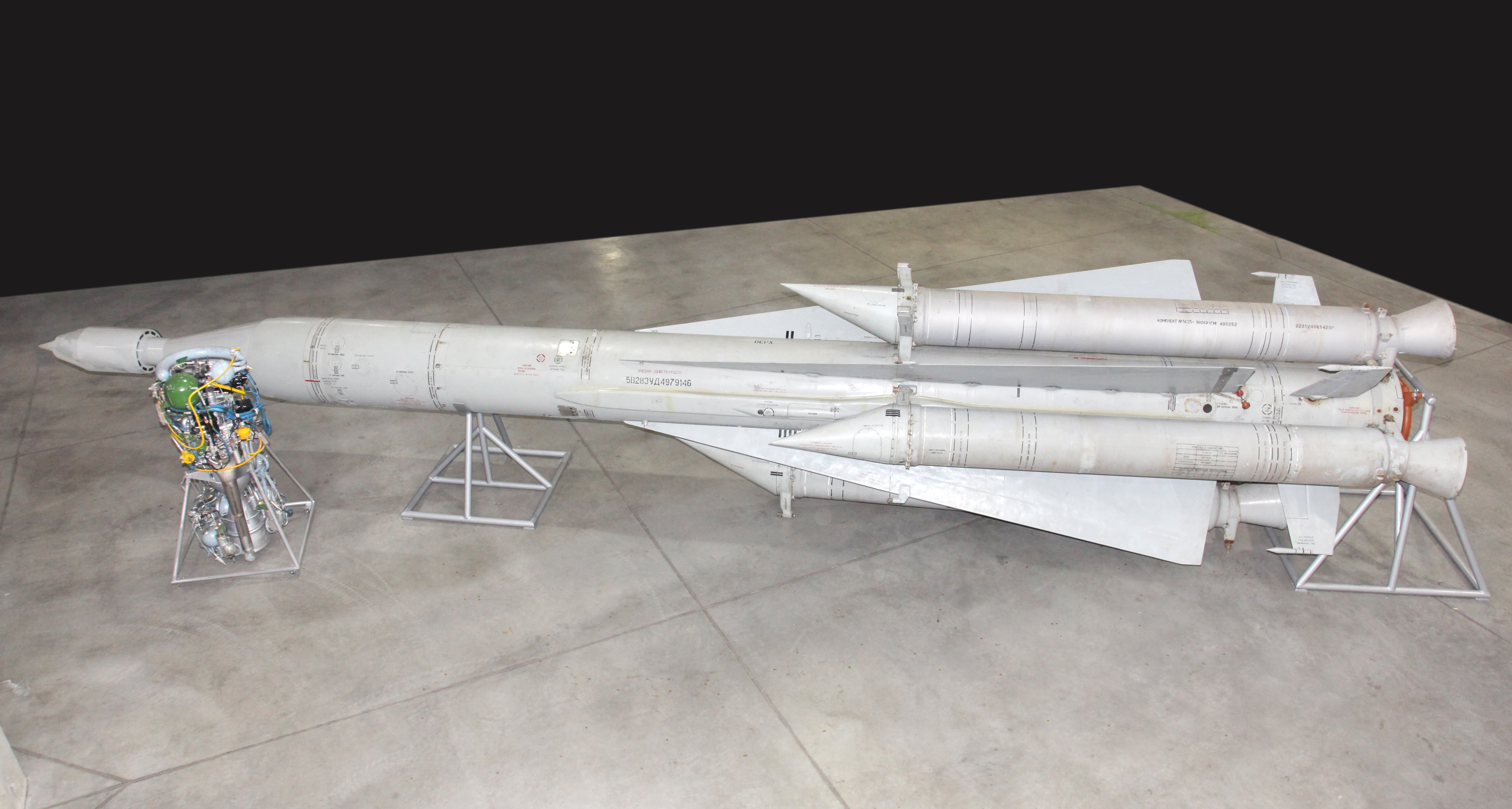
Prototype Kholod

Kholod (Холод) is an experimental Russian rocket project. The hypersonic rocket uses a scramjet engine and was created to exceed Mach 6+ The prototype consists of a Soyuz TMKB with liquid hydrogen and modified fillings from the SA-5 Gammon missiles. The entire rocket, including the four booster rockets, is 12 metres (39 ft) long and 750 millimetres (30 in) in diameter. The project led to other Russian hypersonic rockets like the Igla rocket craft and the Yu-71 boost-glide warhead.

The Kholod became part of a joint CIAM/NASA project to enhance the fundamental understanding of variable geometry ram/scramjet hybrids beginning in the 1990s. These tests resulted in successful flights from Sary Shagan test range in central Kazakhstan in 1998.

The aim of the partnership was to test the Kholod's scramjet at Mach 6.5 while recording all relevant test data both onboard and via telemetry. The Kholod allowed for the testing of variable hypersonic flow, ramjet/scramjet geometry, and more importantly to act as a litmus test to ensure that the data produced by ground experiments was consistent with real world testing at altitude.

The Kholod contained an array of 83 pressure transducers and 58 thermocouples, to monitor the effects of hypersonic flow on the leading edge and inlet. The Kholod's sustained run of its dual mode ramjet/scramjet was primarily enabled by the development of a new alloy named "FeCrAl". The new alloy consisted of steel (Fe), chromium (Cr), and aluminum (Al) that was then covered with chromium-nickel spray; this was a major improvement over the use of the stainless steel alloy EP-666.

The information obtained by the Hypersonic Flying Laboratory enabled researchers to begin designing the next generation of ramjets and scramjets.

Russia would continue to research scramjet platforms under the ORYOL-2-1 program that focused on developing the GLL-8 Igla platform. The success of the Kholod program led to the development of NASA's X-43 to further refine the mechanics of scramjets and to develop control surfaces to enable maneuverability at hypersonic speeds.
