= Impulse facility =

An impulse facility is a testing facility that relies on rapid release of stored energy to generate a short period of high enthalpy test conditions for testing of aerodynamic flow, aerodynamic heating and atmospheric reentry, combustion, chemical kinetics, ballistics, and other effects. The rapid release of energy can result in very high instantaneous energy release rates even though the total energy released is modest. The use of an impulse facility can allow testing of violently energetic phenomena generating temperatures and pressures that no known materials could withstand in steady state. This effect also produces short test times, however, with some types of tests in these facilities lasting less than 100 microseconds. Impulse facilities are a special case of blow down facilities where an energy storage mechanism is charged over a period of time and then released to initiate a test and must be charged again before the next test. This contrasts with continuous facilities such as wind tunnels that may run continuously. Examples of impulse facilities are the shock tube, the shock tunnel, the expansion tube, the expansion tunnel, and the Ludwieg tube.
