= Antonio Ferri =

Italian scientist (1912–1975)

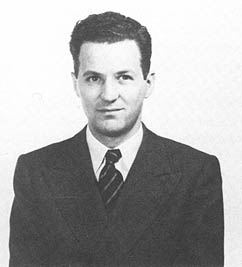
- Ferri in a photo from NASA
- Born: 5 April 1912; Norcia, Italy
- Died: 28 December 1975 (aged 63); Woodbury, New York
- Education: Università di Roma La Sapienza
- Known for: Co-founder of the Banda Fiastra band of partisans during World War II, contributing to the advancement of aerospace engineering, and founding General Applied Science Laboratory
- Board member of: General Applied Science Laboratories Inc. (co-founder)
- Spouse: Renata Mola
- Awards: Premio dell'Accademia d'Italia (for science; 1938); Scientific Achievement Award (1954); Italian Historical Society Award US; (1959); Historical Society Award (US; 1965); Akroyd Stuart Prize (1965); Air Force Commendation for Meritorious Civilian Service (1966); Air Force Office of Aerospace Research Award (1970); Sylvanus Albert Reed Award from the American Institute of Aeronautics and Astronautics (1975)
- Scientific career
- Fields: Aerodynamics, high-speed aircraft development, hypersonic thermofluid dynamics
- Workplaces: National Advisory Committee for Aeronautics (1944-1951); Polytechnic Institute of Brooklyn (1951-1964); New York University (1964-1975)
- Notable students: Luigi G. Napolitano (NYU 1955); Egon Krause (NYU 1966); Charles Ruger (NYU 1966); Michael Siclari (NYU 1974)

Notes
- List of notable students via the Mathematics Genealogy Project.

Antonio Ferri (5 April 1912 – 28 December 1975) was an Italian scientist, prominent in the field of aerodynamics, with a specialization in hypersonic and supersonic flight.

== Background ==
Born in 1912 in Norcia, Italy, from 1937 he conducted research in Guidonia Montecelio, where the most prominent and advanced research on high-speed aerodynamics was taking place. In 1938, at the age of 26, he received Italy's highest prize for science, the Premio dell'Accademia d'Italia for science. Among the work he conducted, there were spectacular experiments in 1939–1940 with supersonic wind tunnels.

During World War II, in the period of the Italian Social Republic (or Salò Republic), three days after the Germans occupied Rome on 10 September 1943, Ferri bluffed his way back into the research facility at Guidonia, destroyed the vital equipment and filled a fruit crate with documents of his research before escaping underground. He secluded his wife and family near his home in Fiastra, in the Marche region of the Apennine Mountains (they later were moved on to an Adriatic fishing village), and in October 1943, organized with his brother, Giuseppe Ferri, the Banda Fiastra band of partisans. For the next year, he coordinated attacks of the region's anti-fascist bands using the Valle del Fiastrone (Fiastra Valley) as a safe haven to return to and to receive Allied air drops.

He eventually made his way to Rome after it was liberated by the Allies, where he made contact with OSS agent Moe Berg and began to work with him translating key documents from the trunk, also passing on his knowledge of the achievements of German science during the war.

The facilities at Guidonia were destroyed in the course of the fighting. In 1944, Ferri was brought to the leading American research centre in his field, the National Advisory Committee for Aeronautics in Langley, Virginia, where he continued as a major figure in his field.

In the immediate postwar period, he studied the use of a biconvex wing profile for high-speed aircraft and developed the Schlieren Flow Visualization method of predicting the impact of shock waves on aircraft wings. He then turned at length to the problem of atmospheric reentry, hypersonic thermofluid dynamics, as applied to the study of supersonic and hypersonic jet engines. He also conducted important studies in the fields of supersonic combustion and aerodynamic heating of high-speed aircraft. In all these areas, he made key contributions to the advancement of aerospace engineering. In 1956 he founded the General Applied Science Laboratory. Ferri was granted a patent for the 'Ferri scoop' jet engine inlet, which would be used on the XF-103, F-105, XF8U-3, and SSM-N-9 Regulus II cruise missile. This type of inlet would lay the foundation for the diverterless supersonic inlet.

Ferri died at his home in Woodbury, New York on December 28, 1975.
