= Expansion tunnel =

Aerodynamic testing facility

In aeronautics, expansion and shock tunnels are aerodynamic testing facilities with a specific interest in high speeds and high temperature testing. Shock tunnels use steady flow nozzle expansion whereas expansion tunnels use unsteady expansion with higher enthalpy, or thermal energy. In both cases the gases are compressed and heated until the gases are released, expanding rapidly down the expansion chamber. The tunnels reach speeds from Mach 3 to Mach 30 to create testing conditions that simulate hypersonic to re-entry flight. These tunnels are used by military and government agencies to test hypersonic vehicles that undergo a variety of natural phenomenon that occur during hypersonic flight.

== Expansion process ==
=== Expansion tunnel ===
Expansion tunnels use a dual-diaphragm system where the diaphragms act as rupture discs, or a pressure relief. The tunnel is separated into three sections: drive, driven, and acceleration. The drive section is filled with high pressure helium gas. The driven section is filled with a lower pressure desired test gas, such as carbon dioxide, helium, nitrogen, or oxygen. The acceleration section is filled with an even lower pressurized test gas. Each section is divided by a diaphragm, which is meant to be ruptured in sequence causing the first diaphragm to rupture, mixing and expanding the drive and the driven. When the shock wave hits the second diaphragm, it ruptures causing the two gases to mix with the acceleration and expand down the enclosed test section. Operation time is approximately 250 microseconds.

=== Shock tunnel ===
Reflected shock tunnels heat and pressurize a stagnant gas by using shockwaves that are redirected back into the center; this excites the gases and produces movement, heat, and pressure. The gases are then released and expanded through the nozzle and into the test chamber. Operation time is approximately 20 milliseconds.

== Testing ==
During the expansion process, a variety of test are run to analyze the aerodynamic and thermal properties of the test vehicle.

Skin friction
The drag that is created when an object travels through a fluid, such as a liquid or gas
Flow chemistry
The analysis of reactions that take place during a continuous flow
Durability
The ability to withstand deterioration
Turbulence
The disordered movement of fluids
Heat transfer
The thermal energy transfer from one system to another
Aero elastic
The forces created by the movement of air and the manner in which air bends around the object
Thermal protection
The ability to withstand heat transfer, reducing the temperature
Vibration
The oscillation, or shaking, of the molecules

== Testing instruments ==
Thin-film heat transfer gauge
When the gauge is heated, the resistance changes; this causes a change in voltage, which is used to calculate the amount of heat transferred into an object
Piezoelectric pressure transducer
Under pressure, crystals became electrically charged, proportional to that of the pressure exerted
Laser diode spectrograph
Measures the properties of the refracted light, generated by the laser traveling through the turbulent gas around an object
Force -moment balance
Used to measure three or six components, three forces (lift, drag, and side) and three moments (pitch, roll, and yaw), to completely describe the conditions on the model. Forces on the model are detected by strain gauges located on the balance. Each gauge measures a force by the stretching of an electrical element or foil in the gauge. The stretching changes the resistance of the gauge which changes the measured electric current through the gauge according to Ohm's law. This resistance change, usually measured using a Wheatstone bridge, is related to the strain by the quantity known as the gauge factor.

== Facilities ==
=== Hypervelocity Expansion Tube (HET) ===
The HET is one of the shock tunnels in the Caltech Hypersonics group at the California Institute of Technology directed by Professor Joanna Austin. It operates similarly to a shock tube where a shock formed by the primary diaphragm heats up the test gas. The novel part of this facility is when its test gas is further accelerated by an expansion shock that forms when the primary shock interacts with a second downstream diaphragm. It is a 150mm inner diameter facility with the capability to reach Mach 4-8, and was built in 2005.

=== HYPULSE ===
The Hypersonic Pulse Facility (HYPULSE) is operated by Purdue University in West Lafayette, Indiana on the campus of Purdue's Maurice J. Zucrow Laboratories. HYPULSE was formerly operated as NASA's HYPULSE by the General Applied Science Laboratory (GASL) in New York before it was donated to Purdue in 2020 by Northrop Grumman. The HYPULSE facility was developed for the testing of re-entry vehicles and air-breathing engines. The specifications of the HYPULSE include a diameter of 7 feet and a 19 foot length. This facility was upgraded to have two modes, Reflected Shock Tunnel (RST) and Shock-Expansion Tunnel (SET). HYPULSE-RST generates speeds from Mach 5 to 10, whereas the HYPULSE-SET produces speeds from Mach 12 to 25.

Vehicles tested at HYPULSE:

- X-34
- X-43
- Space Shuttle thermal protection system (TPS)
- HYPLUSE Scramjet Model (HSM)

=== LENS-I, II ===
Large Energy National Shock tunnels (LENS) were constructed over the past 15 years at the Aerothermal/Aero-optic Evaluation Center (AAEC) at CUBRC. The LENS facilities were developed for the testing of advanced missile seekerheads and scramjet engines. LENS I and LENS II have similar control, compression and data acquisition systems. LENS I facility has an 11-inch diameter by 25.5 foot long drive tube that is electrically heated with an 8-inch by 60 foot driven section capable of reaching Mach 7 to 18. Test models can have a maximum length of 12 feet and a diameter of 3 feet. The LENS I heats up the drive gas to 750 degrees F to operate at a maximum 30,000 psi. The LENS II facility integrates a 24-inch diameter to both the 60 foot drive and also the 100 foot driven tubes, which runs between Mach 3 and 9.

Vehicles tested at LENS-I:

- HyFly
- X-34
- Orbiter model
- National Aerospace Plane(NASP)

Vehicles tested at LENS-II:

- HyFly
- BLK IVA
- X-43
- ARRRMD
- HyCause
- RRSS

=== LENS-X ===
LENS-X is an 8 foot diameter by 100 foot expansion tunnel with a top speed of Mach 30. The drive chamber, filled with helium or hydrogen gas, is compressed to 3,000 psi at 1000 degrees Fahrenheit; this breaks the first diaphragm, causing the driven chamber to experience an influx of hot gas, generating pressures over 20,000 psi before the second diaphragm is ruptured.

Vehicles tested at LENS-X:

- Orion
- DARPA Falcon

=== High Enthalpy Shock Tunnel (HIEST) ===
It is located at Kakuda Space research centre – JAXA (Japan Aerospace Exploration Agency). Both high pressure and high temperature can be simulated simultaneously in this tunnel. Major applications include Aerodynamic and aerothermodynamic tests on scale models of returnable spacecraft; and Combustion process tests on scramjet engines. HYFLEX (Hypersonic Flight Experiment) which was a re-entry demonstrator prototype vehicle of JAXA was tested in this facility. Another speciality of this tunnel is 3 pistons of different masses can be used.

=== T4 Shock Tunnel ===
It is located at University of Queensland, Australia. It is a large free piston driven shock tunnel capable of producing sub-orbital flow speeds at a range of Mach numbers. The T4 shock tunnel began operation in April 1987 and commenced routine operation, after a commissioning period, in September 1987. The 10000th shot of T4 was fired in August 2008. The University of Queensland also maintains the X2, X3, and X3R facilities. X3R now outclasses the T4 facility.

=== T5 Hypervelocity Shock Tunnel Facility ===
It is a free piston shock tunnel located at California Institute of Technology, USA. It is the largest free-piston shock tunnel in the world at a university. It is an impulse facility capable of reaching very high stagnation enthalpies (25 MJ/kg) and pressures (40 MPa). The test time is on the order of 1 ms. It uses helium and argon as the driver gas and a .25" steel plate as its primary diaphragm. Test gases include air, nitrogen, carbon dioxide, or mixtures thereof. The 120 kg piston can reach maximum speeds in excess of 300 m/s.
