= Expansion tube =

Type of impulse facility

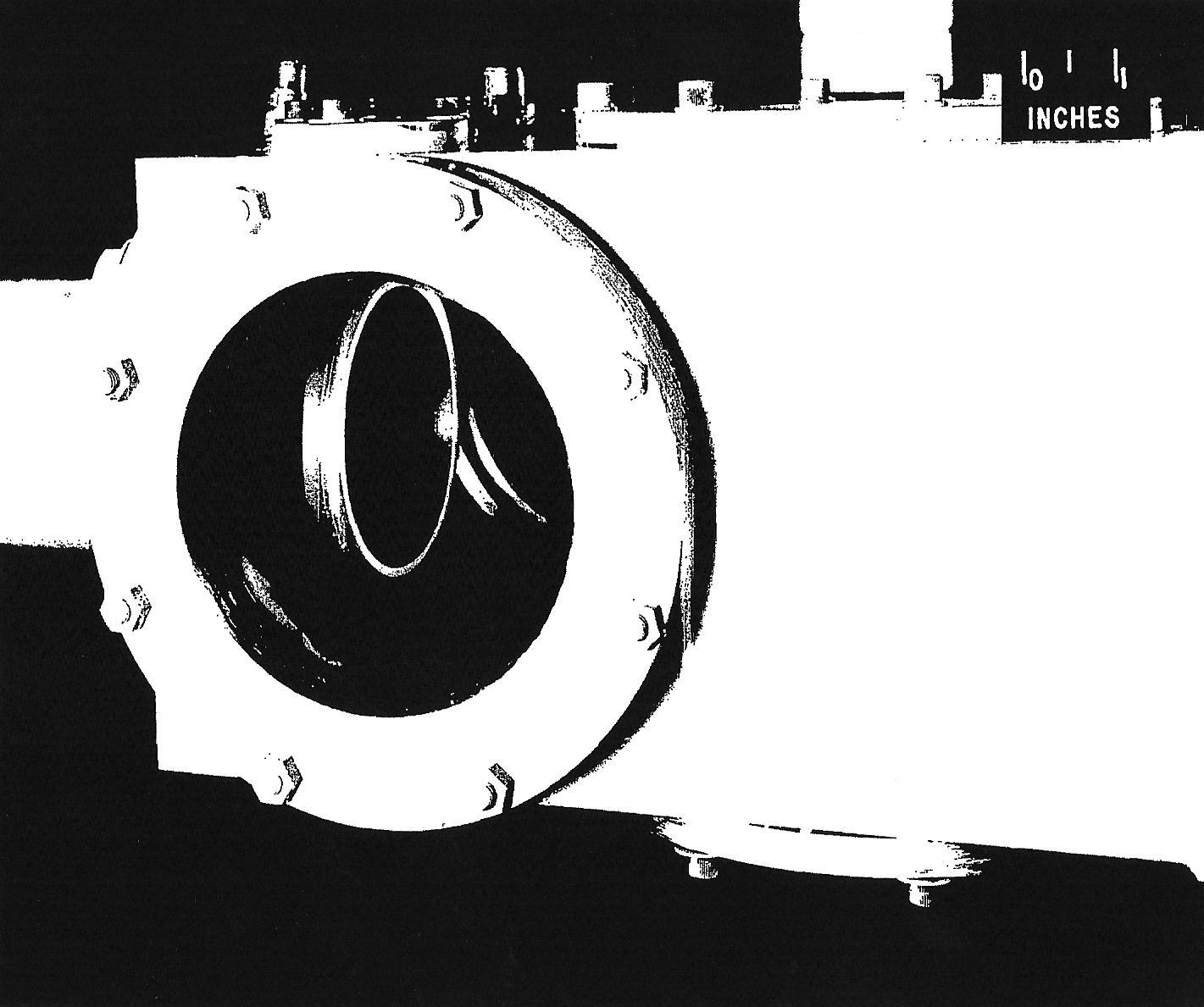
Pilot Model Expansion Tube (9442999705)

An expansion tube is a type of impulse facility that is conceptually similar to a shock tube with a secondary diaphragm, an expansion section, a test section, and a dump tank where the endwall would be located in a shock tube. It is typically used to produce high enthalpy flows for high speed aerodynamic flow and aerodynamic heating and atmospheric reentry testing.

It is used to engender short-duration, high-velocity gas flows. The device is composed commonly of three sections of tubing aligned in tandem. Thin plastic or metal diaphragms are used for separating from the sections from each other. As in an ordinary shock tube, the driver section is originally filled to high pressure with a light gas. The driven section is filled to a lower pressure with the test gas of interest. The third section of tubing, named the expansion section, includes a light gas at very low pressure.

During the time that the driver or driven diaphragm out of function, the driver gas expands into the driven section. A shock wave comes into being which propagates into the test gas, generating an increase in temperature and pressure behind it. The shock travels down the tube, and breaks the driven or expansion diaphragm, and accelerates upon participating in the expansion section. And the shocked test gas is then cooled and speeded up by an unsteady, constant area expansion from the driven section into the lower-pressure expansion section.
