= Boeing X-51 Waverider =

Uncrewed hypersonic experimental aircraft

X-51 Waverider
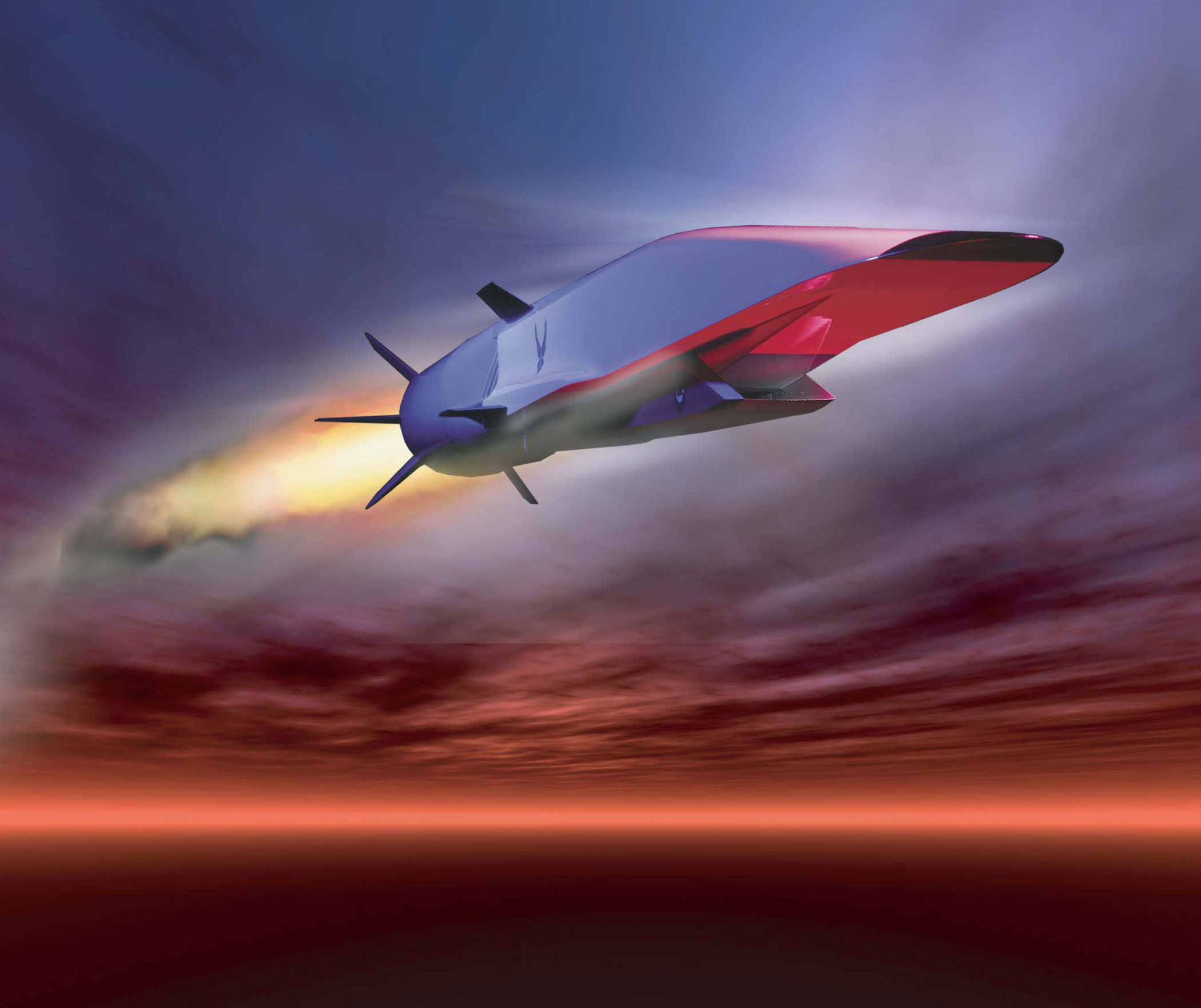
- Artist's concept of X-51A during flight

General information
- Type: Robotic technology demonstrator, hypersonic test aircraft
- National origin: United States
- Manufacturer: Boeing
- Status: Retired (final flight in 2013)
- Primary user: United States Air Force
- Number built: 4

History
- First flight: 26 May 2010
- Retired: 2013

The Boeing X-51 Waverider is an uncrewed research scramjet experimental aircraft for hypersonic flight at Mach 5 (3,300 mph; 5,300 km/h) and an altitude of 70,000 feet (21,000 m). The aircraft was designated X-51 in 2005. It completed its first powered hypersonic flight on 26 May 2010. After two unsuccessful test flights, the X-51 completed a flight of over six minutes and reached speeds of over Mach 5 for 210 seconds on 1 May 2013 for the longest-duration powered hypersonic flight.

Waverider refers in general to aircraft that take advantage of compression lift produced by their own shock waves. The X-51 program was a cooperative effort by the United States Air Force, DARPA, NASA, Boeing, and Pratt & Whitney Rocketdyne. The program was managed by the Aerospace Systems Directorate within the U.S. Air Force Research Laboratory (AFRL).

== Design and development ==
In the 1990s, the Air Force Research Laboratory (AFRL) began the HyTECH program for hypersonic propulsion. Pratt & Whitney received a contract from the AFRL to develop a hydrocarbon-fueled scramjet engine which led to the development of the SJX61 engine. The SJX61 engine was originally meant for the NASA X-43C, which was eventually canceled. The engine was applied to the AFRL's Scramjet Engine Demonstrator program in late 2003. The scramjet flight test vehicle was designated X-51 on 27 September 2005.

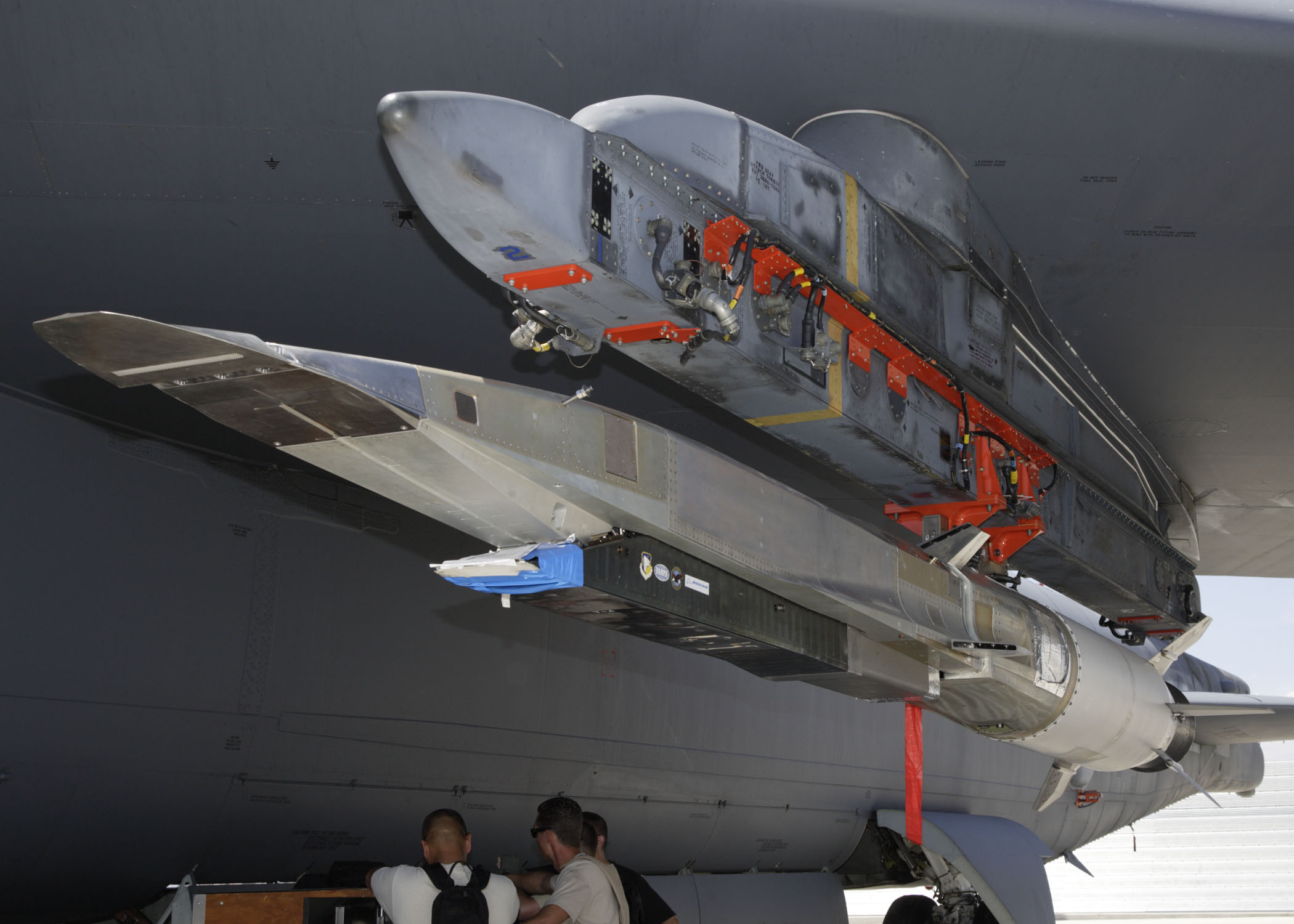
X-51A under the wing of a B-52 at Edwards Air Force Base, July 2009

In flight demonstrations, the X-51 is carried by a B-52 to an altitude of about 50,000 feet (15 km; 9.5 mi) and then released over the Pacific Ocean. The X-51 is initially propelled by an MGM-140 ATACMS solid rocket booster to approximately Mach 4.5 (3,000 mph; 4,800 km/h). The booster is then jettisoned and the vehicle's Pratt & Whitney Rocketdyne SJY61 scramjet accelerates it to a top flight speed near Mach 6 (4,000 mph; 6,400 km/h). The X-51 uses JP-7 fuel for the SJY61 scramjet, carrying 270 lb (120 kg) on board.

=== Applications for hypersonic technology ===
DARPA once viewed X-51 as a stepping stone to Blackswift, a planned hypersonic demonstrator which was canceled in October 2008.

In May 2013, the U.S. Air Force planned to apply X-51 technology to the High Speed Strike Weapon (HSSW), a missile similar in size to the X-51. The HSSW was expected to fly in 2020 and enter service in the mid-2020s. It was to have a range of 500–600 nautical miles (930–1,110 km), fly at Mach 5–6, and fit on an F-35 or in the internal bay of a B-2 bomber.

== Testing ==
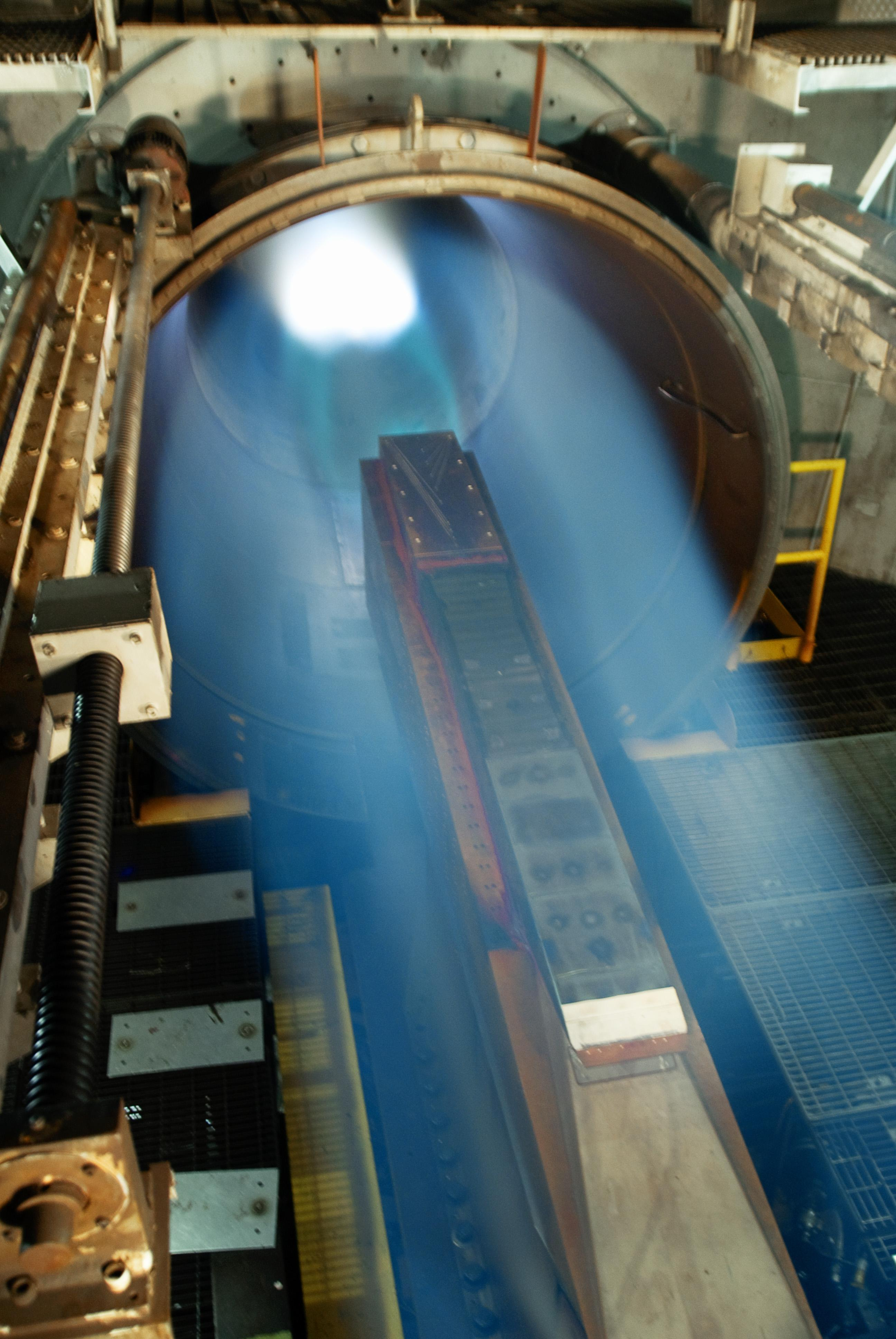
The SJX61-2 engine successfully completes ground tests simulating Mach 5 flight conditions.

=== Ground and unpowered testing ===
Ground tests of the X-51A began in late 2005. A preliminary version of the X-51, the "Ground Demonstrator Engine No. 2", completed wind tunnel tests at the NASA Langley Research Center on 27 July 2006. Testing continued there until a simulated X-51 flight at Mach 5 was successfully completed on 30 April 2007. The testing is intended to observe acceleration between Mach 4 and Mach 6 and to demonstrate that hypersonic thrust "isn't just luck". Four captive test flights were initially planned for 2009. However, the first captive flight of the X-51A on a B-52 was conducted on 9 December 2009, with further flights in early 2010.

=== Powered flight testing ===
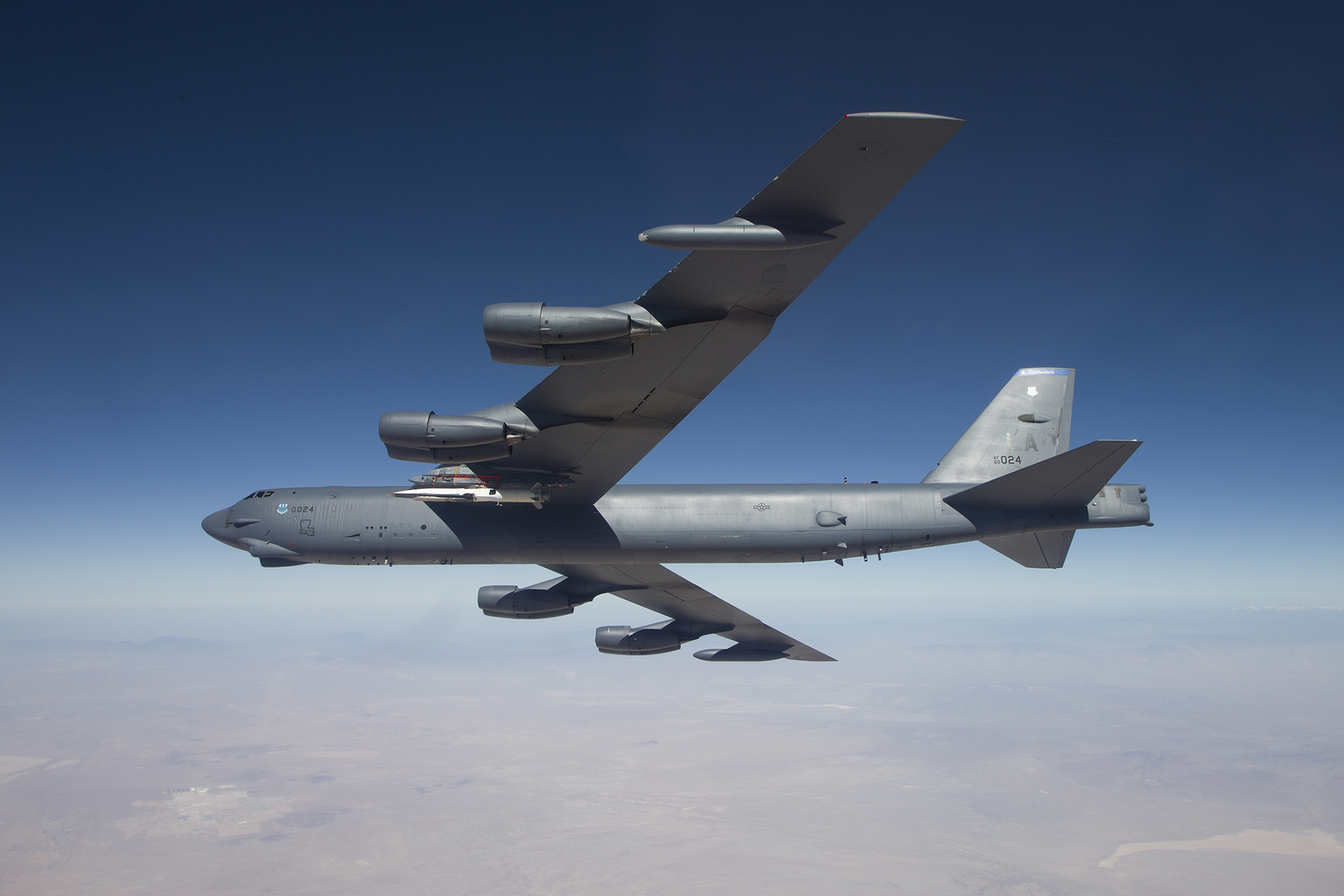
X-51 attached to a B-52H for testing on 1 May 2013

The first powered flight of the X-51 was planned for 25 May 2010, but the presence of a cargo ship traveling through a portion of the Naval Air Station Point Mugu Sea Range caused a 24-hour delay. The X-51 completed its first powered flight successfully on 26 May 2010. It reached a speed of Mach 5 (3,300 mph; 5,300 km/h), an altitude of 70,000 feet (21,000 m) and flew for over 200 seconds; it did not meet the planned 300 second flight duration, however. The test had the longest hypersonic flight time of 140 seconds while under its scramjet power. The X-43 had the previous longest flight burn time of 12 seconds, while setting a new speed record of Mach 9.68.

Three more test flights were planned and used the same flight trajectory. Boeing proposed to the Air Force Research Laboratory (AFRL) that two test flights be added to increase the total to six, with flights taking place at four to six week intervals, provided there are no failures.

The second test flight was initially scheduled for 24 March 2011, but was not conducted due to unfavorable test conditions. The flight took place on 13 June 2011. However, the flight over the Pacific Ocean ended early due to an inlet unstart event after being boosted to Mach 5 speed. The flight data from the test was being investigated. A B-52 released the X-51 at an approximate altitude of 50,000 feet (15,000 m). The X-51's scramjet engine lit on ethylene, but did not properly transition to JP-7 fuel operation.

The third test flight took place on 14 August 2012. The X-51 was to make a 300-second (5 minutes) experimental flight at speeds of Mach 5 (3,300 mph; 5,300 km/h). After separating from its rocket booster, the craft lost control and crashed into the Pacific. The Air Force Research Laboratory (AFRL) determined the problem was the X-51's upper right aerodynamic fin unlocked during flight and became uncontrollable; all four fins are needed for aerodynamic control. The aircraft lost control before the scramjet engine could ignite.

On 1 May 2013, the X-51 performed its first fully successful flight test on its fourth test flight. The X-51 and booster detached from a B-52H and was powered to Mach 4.8 (3,200 mph; 5,100 km/h) by the booster rocket. It then separated cleanly from the booster and ignited its own engine. The test aircraft then accelerated to Mach 5.1 (3,400 mph; 5,400 km/h) and flew for 210 seconds until running out of fuel and plunging into the Pacific Ocean off Point Mugu for over six minutes of total flight time; this test was the longest air-breathing hypersonic flight. Researchers collected telemetry data for 370 seconds of flight. The test signified the completion of the program. The Air Force Research Laboratory believes the successful flight will serve as research for practical applications of hypersonic flight, such as a missile, reconnaissance, transport, and air-breathing first stage for a space system.

== Specifications ==
Data from Boeing, Air Force

- Crew: None
- Length: 25 ft 0 in (7.62 m)
- Empty weight: 4,000 lb (1,814 kg)
- Powerplant: 1 × MGM-140 ATACMS rocket booster
- Powerplant: 1 × Pratt & Whitney Rocketdyne SJY61 scramjet

Performance

- Maximum speed: 3,900 mph (6,200 km/h, 3,400 kn)
- Maximum speed: Mach 5.1
- Range: 460 mi (740 km, 400 nmi)
- Service ceiling: 70,000 ft (21,300 m)

== See also ==
- Boeing Small Launch Vehicle concept, includes a hypersonic waverider as the second stage
- Flight airspeed record
- Scramjet programs
