= General Applied Science Laboratory =

American aerosoace research organization

Coordinates: 38°53′41″N 77°4′21″W

General Applied Science Laboratory (GASL) is an American aerospace company, known as a pioneer of hypersonic propulsion.

== Description ==
General Applied Science Laboratory was founded in 1956 by Antonio Ferri and became a developer and testing house for advanced propulsion systems. Another early researcher was Theodore von Kármán. Its expertise in hypersonic harsh environments has allowed it to research and test materials and methods for extreme high temperatures as well as combustion systems relevant to current power generation and clean energy. The company is now based in Ronkonkoma, New York.

In 1965, GASL became a subsidiary of The Marquardt Corporation of Van Nuys, California. At that time the company was located in Westbury, Long Island, New York. GASL also had an electronics division with two locations in Syosset, Long Island. Part of the electronics operation was the manufacture of Janus doppler navigation devices for docking large ships. GASL also manufactured oscilloscopes and produced very advanced devices for laboratory use.

The electronic products operations were made part of Marquardt Industrial Products Company (MIPCO), headquartered in Pomona, California, in 1967. The Janus products were ultimately transferred to Van Nuys, California, and formed a division named "Marquardt Marine Products", which was sold to Ametek in 1971.

In 1967, Antonio Ferri resigned as President of GASL and Louis M. Nucci was elected president. Antonio Ferri became the Vincent Astor Professor of Aerospace Sciences at New York University.

The company participated in the National Aero-Space Plane (X-30) and NASA X-43 programs in the 1990s. GASL has a propulsion and combustion test complex with seven high pressure, high temperature test cells, and NASA's Hypersonic Pulse Facility (HYPULSE).

GASL, Inc. was founded in 1956 as Gruen Applied Science Laboratories, Inc. Later in 1958 it changed its name to General Applied Science Laboratories, Inc. and subsequently changed its name to GASL, Inc. in 1995. On November 20, 2003, Alliant Techsystems (ATK) acquired GASL from Allied Aerospace.

GASL developed Scramjet technology for propulsion such as the GASL Projectile fired in 2001.

GASL upgraded the NASA-HYPULSE test facility to simulate Mach 7 and Mach 10 flight speeds.

In January 2010, ATK's Center for Energy and Aerospace Innovation (CEAI) was dedicated at GASL to develop clean energy technologies. One project, funded by the US Advanced Research Projects Agency-Energy (ARPA-E) uses experience from hypersonic wind tunnel tests to improve CO_{2} capture from power plants. Another 2010 project uses GASL expertise in managing hydrogen to develop storage systems for hydrogen vehicles.

In May 2012, The Hypersonic International Flight Research Experimentation (HIFiRE), Flight 2 Payload System, designed and built by the GASL team at ATK (NYSE: ATK), executed a successful test flight achieving Mach 8.5 and acquiring the first-ever data on dual-mode-to-scramjet propulsion transition.

=== Markets ===
GASL provides research, engineering and testing to government and businesses in 12 primary areas:

- Hypersonic and propulsion systems testing
- Combustion systems and components testing
- High shear testing
- High temperature material testing (Up to 4350F and 1500 psi)
- Simulated blast testing (Shock Wave Tube)
- Energy systems integration and testing
- Gasification systems and components
- Fuel reforming systems
- Hydrogen based energy systems
- Light weight energy storage devices
- MEMS sensors for harsh environments
- Cooling, Micro-cooling and fuel injected cooling systems
