= Baranov Central Institute of Aviation Motor Development =

Russian research centre

Coordinates: 55°45′37″N 37°42′36″E

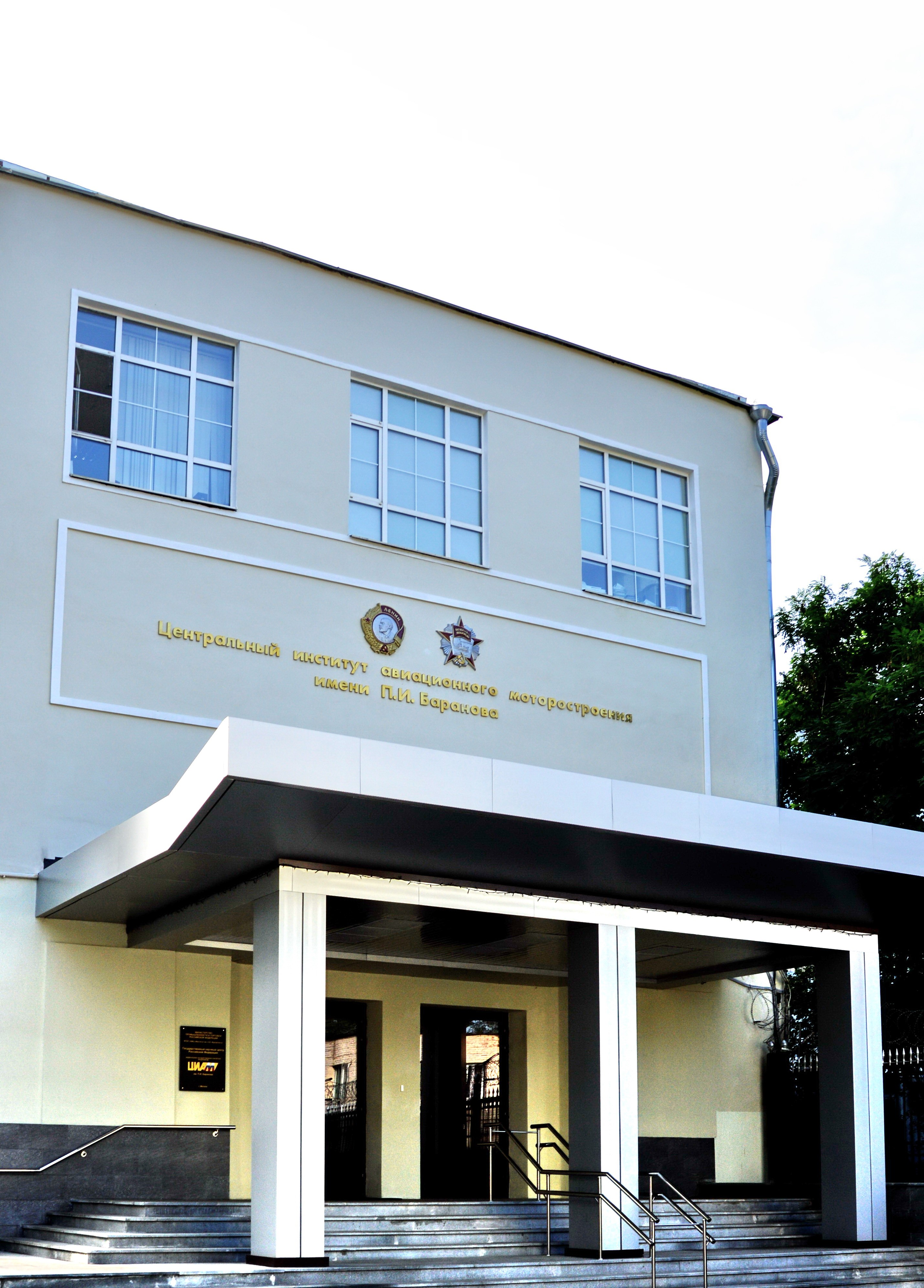
- Native name: Центральный институт авиационного моторостроения имени П. И. Баранова (ЦИАМ)
- Type: federal autonomous institution
- Industry: aerospace
- Founded: 1930; 96 years ago
- Headquarters: Lefortovo, Moscow, Russia
- Area served: Europe and Asia
- Key people: Mikhail Gordin, Director General
- Owner: Russian Federation
- Website: www.ciam.ru/en/

The P. I. Baranov Central Institute of Aviation Motor Development (also known as the "Central Institute for Aviation Motor Development named after P. I. Baranov" or simply "Central Institute of Aviation Motors", CIAM or TsIAM, Tsentralniy Institut Aviatsionnogo Motorostroeniya, Russian: Центральный институт авиационного моторостроения) is the only specialized Russian research and engineering facility dealing with advanced aerospace propulsion research, aircraft engine certification and other gas dynamics-related issues. It was founded on 3 December 1930 upon merging of the propeller engine department under the umbrella organisation Central Institute of Aerohydrodynamics and the department of experimental engine building of the M. V. Frunze Aviation Plant.

CIAM operates the largest aerospace engine testing facility in Europe, surpassed only by the United States's Arnold Engineering Development Center and Glenn Research Center. It is based in Lefortovo (the southeast okrug of Moscow) with an address of 2 Aviamotornaya street, Moscow, Postcode 111116. CIAM also operates a scientific testing center in Lytkarino, Moscow Oblast.

== History ==
The bases of the institute were formed by such academics as Keldysh, Klimov and Chelomey. Since its foundation in 1930, CIAM designed nearly all Russian aviation motors and gas turbines. In 1933 CIAM was named after the late Soviet Vice-Narkom of Heavy Industry Petr Ionovich Baranov, who was one of the leading theorists of the Soviet aviation industry. Before World War II, all engine-design work was transferred to mass-production motor-building plants and their own design bureaus. CIAM focused on theoretical and experimental research and modernization of prototypes up to the production stage.

After the war, CIAM was engaged with reactive (jet) engines for airplanes, successors to the first-generation turbojets. In the early 1950s, the largest test base in Europe was built in Lytkarino. In the 1970s, the institute began work on a ramjet engine using the special hypersonic "flying laboratory" GLL Holod. This experiment used a liquid hydrogen, actively cooled dual-mode ramjet, which was based on a hydrogen-fueled axisymmetrical engine placed on a Russian SA5 missile during the flight. The first successful test achieved Mach 5.6 in 1991, and the maximum speed achieved was Mach 5.7 in November 1992. A test with a goal of Mach 6.3 failed in March 1995.

After the dissolution of the USSR, CIAM lost a large number of emigrating engineers. With the loss of government support and a lack of state aviation strategy, CIAM stayed afloat with contracts with China, French corporations, ABB and by offering logistical services. As of 2011, the situation has stabilized; CIAM leads Russian aero engine research programs, including development of the advanced PD-35 engine. It also researches gas pipelines; in March 2006, the institute signed an agreement with JSC Gasprom.

== See also ==
- TsAGI
- Moscow Aviation Institute
- Arnold Engineering Development Center
- Glenn Research Center
