= Waverider =

Hypersonic aircraft design

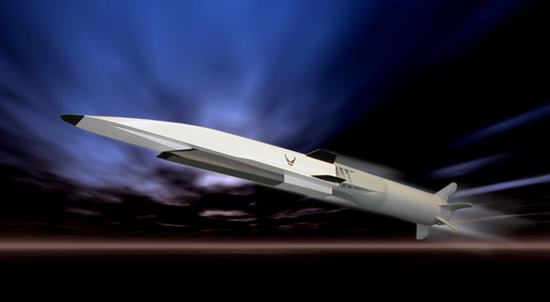
The Boeing X-51 forebody is an example of cone-derived waverider

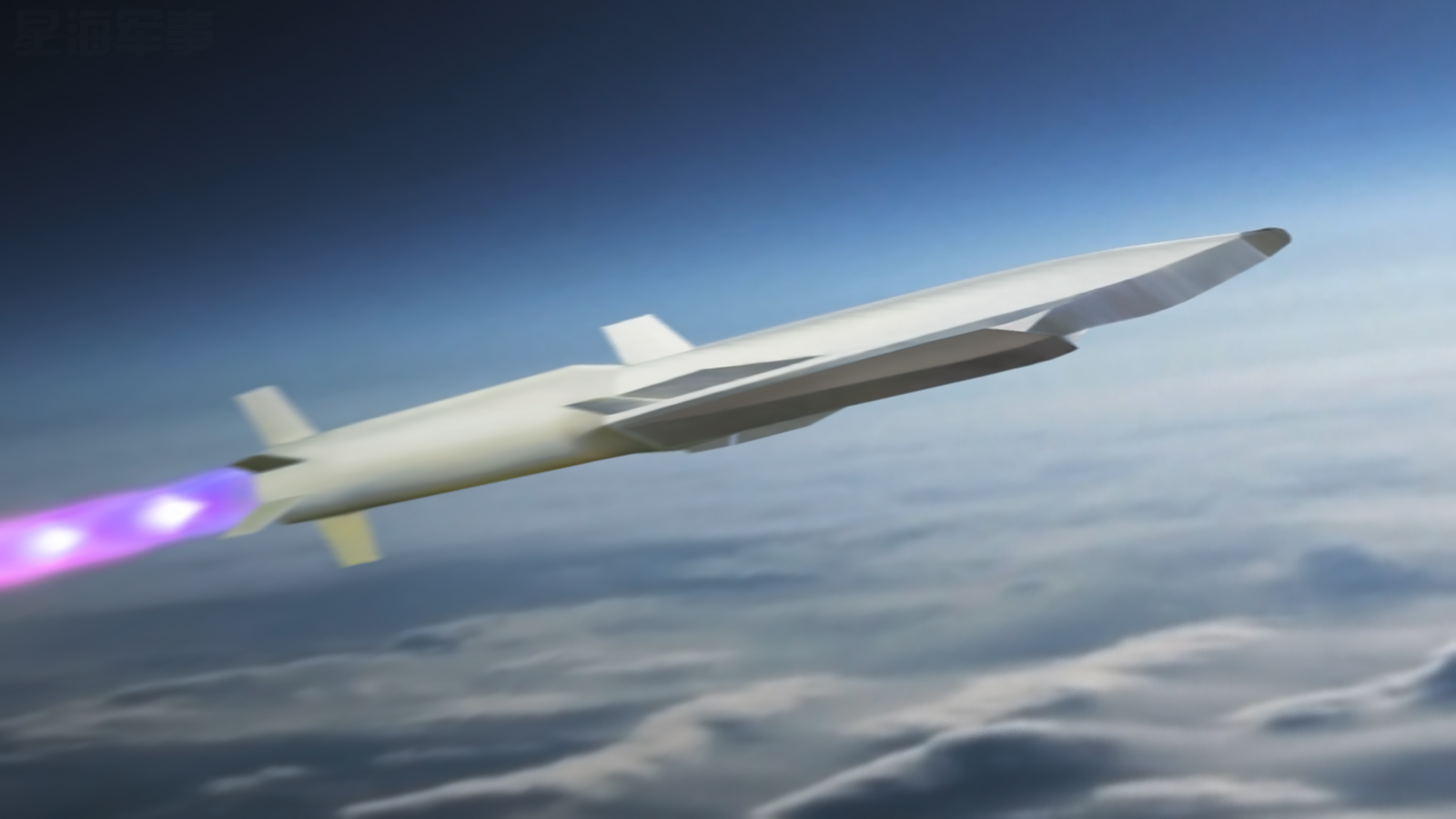
another configuration of waverider.

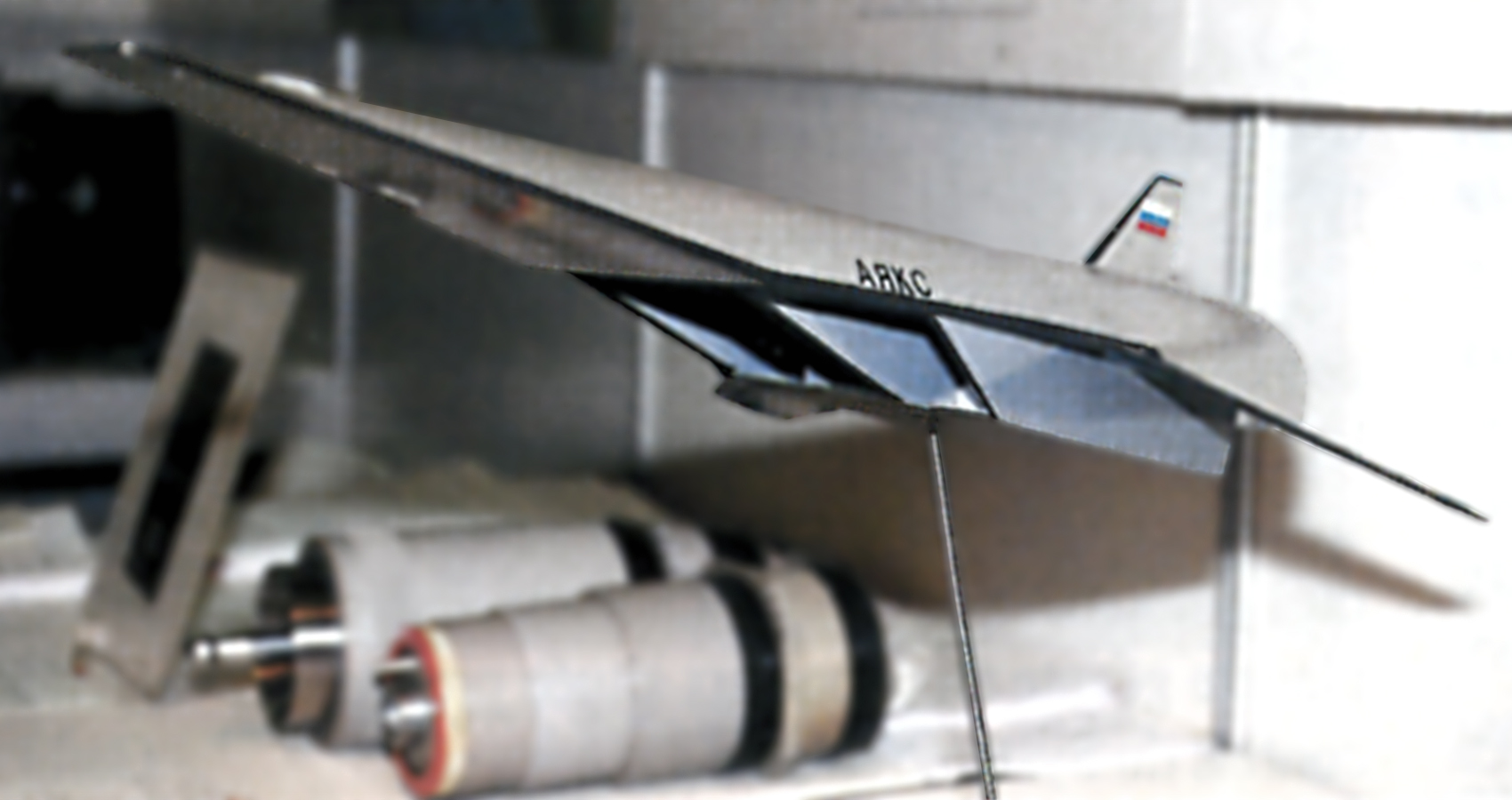
Small-scale model of the Soviet/Russian Ayaks aircraft exposed at the 1993 MAKS Air Show, Moscow. It is still currently under development

A waverider is a hypersonic aircraft design that improves its supersonic lift-to-drag ratio by using the shock waves being generated by its own flight as a lifting surface, a phenomenon known as compression lift.

The waverider remains a well-studied design for high-speed aircraft in the Mach 5 and higher hypersonic regime, although no such design has yet entered production. The Boeing X-51 scramjet demonstration aircraft was tested from 2010 to 2013. In its final test flight, it reached a speed of Mach 5.1 (5,400 km/h; 3,400 mph).

== History ==
=== Early work ===
The waverider design concept was first developed by Terence Nonweiler of the Queen's University of Belfast, and first described in print in 1951 as a re-entry vehicle. It consisted of a delta-wing platform with a low wing loading to provide considerable surface area to dump the heat of re-entry. At the time, Nonweiler was forced to use a greatly simplified 2D model of airflow around the aircraft, which he realized would not be accurate due to spanwise flow across the wing. However, he also noticed that the spanwise flow would be stopped by the shockwave being generated by the aircraft, and that if the wing was positioned to deliberately approach the shock, the spanwise flow would be trapped under wing, increasing pressure, and thus increasing lift.

In the 1950s, the British started a space program based around the Blue Streak missile, which was, at some point, to include a crewed vehicle. Armstrong-Whitworth were contracted to develop the re-entry vehicle, and unlike the U.S. space program, they decided to stick with a winged vehicle instead of a ballistic capsule. Between 1957 and 1959, they contracted Nonweiler to develop his concepts further. This work produced a pyramid-shaped design with a flat underside and short wings. Heat was conducted through the wings to the upper cool surfaces, where it was dumped into the turbulent air on the top of the wing. In 1960, work on the Blue Streak was canceled as the missile was seen as being obsolete before it could have entered service. Work then moved to the Royal Aircraft Establishment (RAE), where it continued as a research program into high-speed (Mach 4 to 7) civilian airliners.

This work was discovered by engineers at North American Aviation during the early design studies of what would lead to the XB-70 bomber. They re-designed the original "classic" delta wing to incorporate drooping wing tips in order to trap the shock waves mechanically, rather than using a shock cone generated from the front of the aircraft. This mechanism also had two other beneficial effects; it reduced the amount of horizontal lifting surface at the rear of the aircraft, which helped offset a nose-down trim that occurs at high speeds, and it added more vertical surface which helped improve the directional stability, which decreased at high speed.

=== Caret wing ===
Nonweiler's original design used the shock wave generated by the aircraft as a way to control spanwise flow, and thereby increase the amount of air trapped under the wing in the same way as a wing fence. While working on these concepts, he noticed that it was possible to shape the wing in such a way that the shock wave generated off its leading edge would form a horizontal sheet under the craft. In this case, the airflow would not only be trapped horizontally, spanwise, but vertically as well. The only area the air above the shock wave could escape would be out the back of the sheet where the fuselage ended. Since the air was trapped between this sheet and the fuselage, a large volume of air would be trapped, much more than the more basic approach he first developed. Furthermore, since the shock surface was held at a distance from the craft, shock heating was limited to the leading edges of the wings, lowering the thermal loads on the fuselage.

In 1962 Nonweiler moved to Glasgow University to become Professor of Aerodynamics and Fluid Mechanics. That year his "Delta Wings of Shapes Amenable to Exact Shock-Wave Theory" was published by the Journal of the Royal Aeronautical Society, and earned him that society's Gold Medal. A craft generated using this model looks like a delta wing that has been broken down the center and the two sides folded downward. From the rear it looks like an upside-down V, or alternately, the "caret", ^, and such designs are known as "caret wings". Two to three years later the concept briefly came into the public eye, due to the airliner work at the RAE that led to the prospect of reaching Australia in 90 minutes. Newspaper articles led to an appearance on Scottish Television.

Hawker Siddeley examined the caret wing waverider in the later 1960s as a part of a three-stage lunar rocket design. The first stage was built on an expanded Blue Steel, the second a waverider, and the third a nuclear-powered crewed stage. This work was generalized in 1971 to produce a two-staged reusable spacecraft. The 121-foot (37 m) long first stage was designed as a classical waverider, with air-breathing propulsion for return to the launch site. The upper stage was designed as a lifting body, and would have carried an 8000-pound (3.6 t) payload to low Earth orbit.

=== Cone flow waveriders ===
Nonweiler's work was based on studies of planar 2D shocks due to the difficulty understanding and predicting real-world shock patterns around 3D bodies. As the study of hypersonic flows improved, researchers were able to study waverider designs that used different shockwave shapes, the simplest being the conical shock generated by a cone. In these cases, a waverider is designed to keep the rounded shockwave attached to its wings, not a flat sheet, which increases the volume of air trapped under the surface, and thereby increases lift.

Unlike the caret wing, the cone flow designs smoothly curve their wings, from near horizontal in the center, to highly drooped where they meet the shock. Like the caret wing, they have to be designed to operate at a specific speed to properly attach the shock wave to the wing's leading edge, but unlike them the entire body shape can be varied dramatically at the different design speeds, and sometimes have wingtips that curve upward to attach to the shockwave.

Further development of the conical sections, adding canopies and fuselage areas, led to the "osculating cones waverider", which develops several conical shock waves at different points on the body, blending them to produce a single shaped shock. The expansion to a wider range of compression surface flows allowed the design of waveriders with control of volume, upper surface shape, engine integration and centre of pressure position. Performance improvements and off-design analysis continued until 1970.

During this period at least one waverider was tested at the Woomera Rocket Range, mounted on the nose of an air-launched Blue Steel missile, and a number of airframes were tested in the wind tunnel at NASA's Ames Research Center. However, during the 1970s most work in hypersonics disappeared, and the waverider along with it.

=== Viscous optimized waveriders ===
One of the many differences between supersonic and hypersonic flight concerns the interaction of the boundary layer and the shock waves generated from the nose of the aircraft. Normally the boundary layer is quite thin compared to the streamline of airflow over the wing, and can be considered separately from other aerodynamic effects. However, as the speed increases and the shock wave increasingly approaches the sides of the craft, there comes a point where the two start to interact and the flowfield becomes very complex. Long before that point, the boundary layer starts to interact with the air trapped between the shock wave and the fuselage, the air that is being used for lift on a waverider.

Calculating the effects of these interactions was beyond the abilities of aerodynamics until the introduction of useful computational fluid dynamics starting in the 1980s. In 1981, Maurice Rasmussen at the University of Oklahoma started a waverider renaissance by publishing a paper on a new 3D underside shape using these techniques. These shapes have superior lifting performance and less drag. Since then, whole families of cone-derived waveriders have been designed using more and more complex conic shocks, based on more complex software. This work eventually led to a conference in 1989, the First International Hypersonic Waverider Conference, held at the University of Maryland.

These newest shapes, the "viscous optimized waveriders", look similar to conical designs as long as the angle of the shock wave on the nose is beyond some critical angle, about 14 degrees for a Mach 6 design for instance. The angle of the shock can be controlled by widening out the nose into a curved plate of specific radius, and reducing the radius produces a smaller shock cone angle. Vehicle design starts by selecting a given angle and then developing the body shape that traps that angle, then repeating this process for different angles. For any given speed, a single shape will generate the best results.

== Design ==
During re-entry, hypersonic vehicles generate lift only from the underside of the fuselage. The underside, which is inclined to the flow at a high angle of attack, creates lift in reaction to the vehicle wedging the airflow downwards. The amount of lift is not particularly high, compared to a traditional wing, but more than enough to maneuver given the amount of distance the vehicle covers.

Most re-entry vehicles have been based on the blunt-nose reentry design pioneered by Theodore von Kármán. He demonstrated that a shock wave is forced to "detach" from a curved surface, forced out into a larger configuration that requires considerable energy to form. Energy expended in forming this shock wave is no longer available as heat, so this shaping can dramatically reduce the heat load on the spacecraft. Such a design has been the basis for almost every re-entry vehicle since, found on the blunt noses of the early ICBM warheads, the bottoms of the various NASA capsules, and the large nose of the Space Shuttle.

The problem with the blunt-nose system is that the resulting design creates very little lift, meaning the vehicle has problems maneuvering during re-entry. If the spacecraft is meant to be able to return to its point of launch "on command", then some sort of maneuvering will be required to counteract the fact that the Earth is turning under the spacecraft as it flies. After a single low Earth orbit, the launching point will be over 1,000 km (600 mi) to the east of the spacecraft by the time it has completed one full orbit. A considerable amount of research was dedicated to combining the blunt-nose system with wings, leading to the development of the lifting body designs in the U.S.

It was while working on one such design that Nonweiler developed the waverider. He noticed that the detachment of the shock wave over the blunt leading edges of the wings of the Armstrong-Whitworth design would allow the air on the bottom of the craft to flow spanwise and escape to the upper part of the wing through the gap between the leading edge and the detached shock wave. This loss of airflow reduced (by up to a quarter) the lift being generated by the waverider, which led to studies on how to avoid this problem and keep the flow trapped under the wing.

Nonweiler's resulting design is a delta-wing with some amount of negative dihedral — the wings are bent down from the fuselage towards the tips. When viewed from the front, the wing resembles a caret symbol in cross section, and these designs are often referred to as carets. The more modern 3D version typically looks like a rounded letter 'M'. Theoretically, a star-shaped waverider with a frontal cross-section of a "+" or "×" could reduce drag by another 20%. The disadvantage of this design is that it has more area in contact with the shock wave and therefore has more pronounced heat dissipation problems.

Waveriders generally have sharp noses and sharp leading edges on their wings. The underside shock-surface remains attached to this. Air flowing in through the shock surface is trapped between the shock and the fuselage, and can only escape at the rear of the fuselage. With sharp edges, all the lift is retained.

Even though sharp edges get much hotter than rounded ones at the same air density, the improved lift means that waveriders can glide on re-entry at much higher altitudes where the air density is lower. A list ranking various space vehicles in order of heating applied to the airframe would have capsules at the top (re-entering quickly with very high heating loads), waveriders at the bottom (extremely long gliding profiles at high altitude), and the Space Shuttle somewhere in the middle.

Simple waveriders have substantial design problems. First, the obvious designs only work at a particular Mach number, and the amount of lift captured will change dramatically as the vehicle changes speed. Another problem is that the waverider depends on radiative cooling, possible as long as the vehicle spends most of its time at very high altitudes. However these altitudes also demand a very large wing to generate the needed lift in the thin air, and that same wing can become rather unwieldy at lower altitudes and speeds.

Because of these problems, waveriders have not found favor with practical aerodynamic designers, despite the fact that they might make long-distance hypersonic vehicles efficient enough to carry air freight.

Some researchers controversially claim that there are designs that overcome these problems. One candidate for a multi-speed waverider is a "caret wing", operated at different angles of attack. A caret wing is a delta wing with longitudinal conical or triangular slots or strakes. It strongly resembles a paper airplane or rogallo wing. The correct angle of attack would become increasingly precise at higher Mach numbers, but this is a control problem that is theoretically solvable. The wing is said to perform even better if it can be constructed of tight mesh, because that reduces its drag, while maintaining lift. Such wings are said to have the unusual attribute of operating at a wide range of Mach numbers in different fluids with a wide range of Reynolds numbers.

The temperature problem can be solved with some combination of a transpiring surface, exotic materials, and possibly heat-pipes. In a transpiring surface, small amounts of a coolant such as water are pumped through small holes in the aircraft's skin (see transpiration and perspiration). This design works for Mach 25 spacecraft re-entry shields, and therefore should work for any aircraft that can carry the weight of the coolant. Exotic materials such as carbon-carbon composite do not conduct heat but endure it, but they tend to be brittle. Heatpipes are not widely used at present. Like a conventional heat exchanger, they conduct heat better than most solid materials, but like a thermosiphon are passively pumped. The Boeing X-51A deals with external heating through the use of a tungsten nosecone and space shuttle-style heat shield tiles on its belly. Internal (engine) heating is absorbed by using the JP-7 fuel as a coolant prior to combustion. Other high temperature materials, referred to as SHARP materials (typically zirconium diboride and hafnium diboride) have been used on steering vanes for ICBM reentry vehicles since the 1970s, and are proposed for use on hypersonic vehicles. They are said to permit Mach 11 flight at 100,000 ft (30,000 m) altitudes and Mach 7 flight at sea level. These materials are more structurally rugged than the Reinforced Carbon Composite (RCC) used on the space shuttle nose and leading edges, have higher radiative and temperature tolerance properties, and do not suffer from oxidation issues that RCC needs to be protected against with coatings.

=== Surface material ===
A surface material for waverider and hypersonic (Mach 5 – 10) vehicles developed by scientists at the China Academy of Aerospace Aerodynamics (CAAA) in Beijing was tested during 2023.

An alternative developed by RTX Corporation uses a perspiring membrane developed under work supported by the United States Air Force under Contract No. United States Air Force FA8650-20-C-7001

== See also ==
- Index of aviation articles
