= Jelení hora =

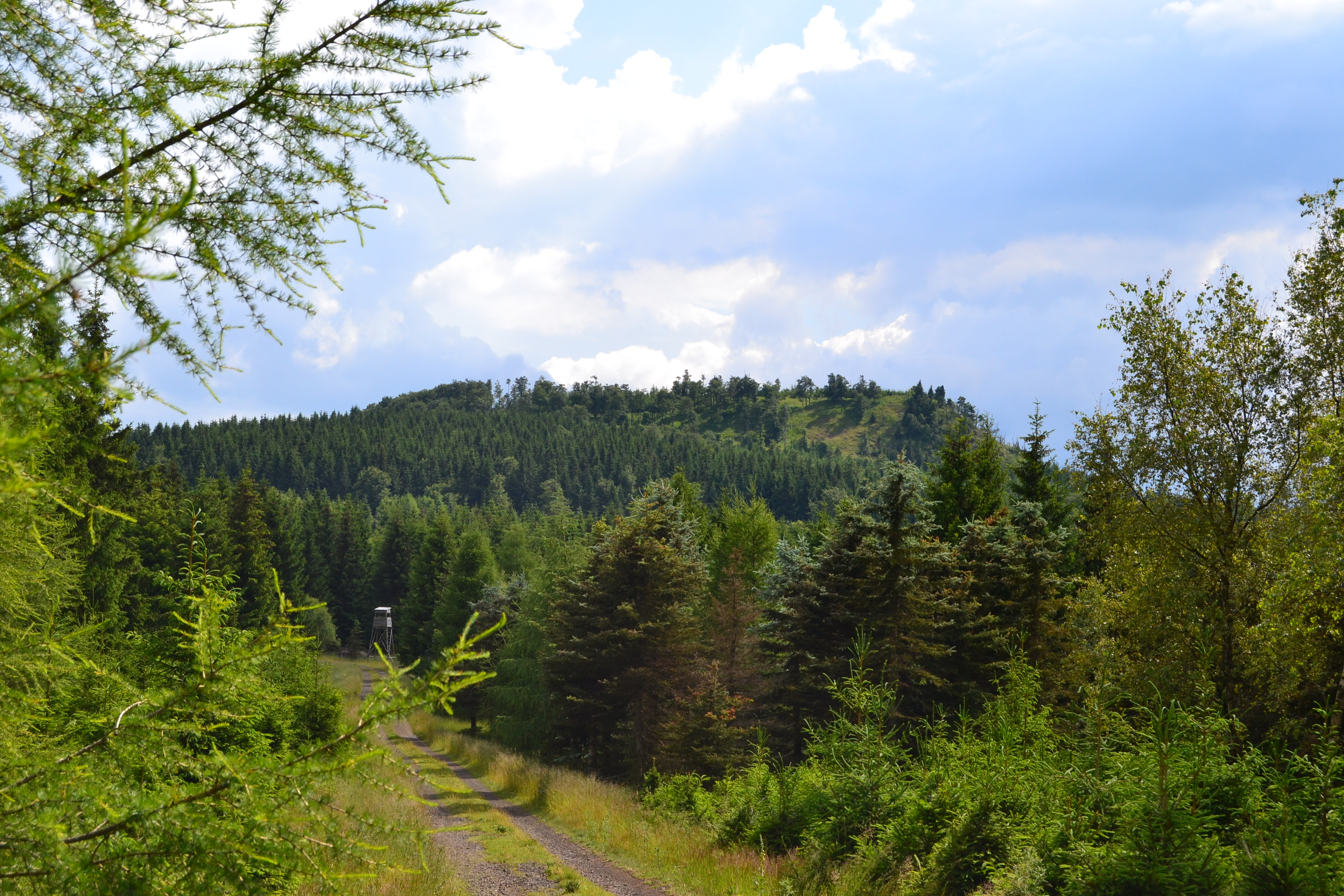
- Jelení hora seen from the north

Highest point
- Elevation: 993 m (3,258 ft)
- Prominence: 176 m (577 ft)
- Isolation: 12.1 km (7.5 mi)
- Coordinates: 50°29′25″N 13°09′31″E

Geography
- Location within Czech Republic
- Location: Ústí Region, Czech Republic
- Parent range: Ore Mountains

Geology
- Mountain type: basalt

The Jelení hora (German: Haßberg) is a 993 m (3,258 ft) high mountain in the Czech part of the Ore Mountains.

== Location and surrounding area ==
The mountain lies immediately southeast of the village of Kryštofovy Hamry. It rises above the broad valley of the Preßnitz river and the Přísečnice Reservoir, which is on the site of the former mining town of Přísečnice.

== Routes to the summit ==
The route to the summit sets out from the dam wall on the Preßnitz Reservoir, which is crossed on foot, and follows the metalled track uphill to about 500 m after the dam where another metalled track branches off to the right. It follows this for about 400 m to the first bend in the track where it turns left onto a steep, straight path. Where this climb ends after about 1600 m, the route leaves the track, again to the left, and onto a footpath. After a final short climb this reaches the plateau of the Jelení hora.

== Description ==
The steep, narrow and sparsely wooded basalt Kuppe of the mountain is striking as it rises above the broad plateaus of the Ore Mountain ridge and offers a good view of the Upper Ore Mountains and a glimpse into the Eger valley. At its highest elevation is a summit cross with a summit register.

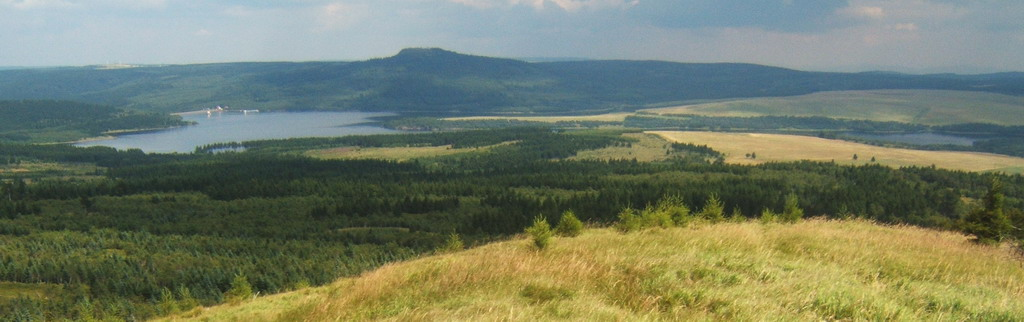
Jelení hora and Preßnitz reservoir, seen from the Velký Špičák

== See also ==
- List of mountains in the Ore Mountains
