= Space bomber =

Space bomber may refer to:

- スペースボンバー or Space Bomber, a Japanese arcade game
- The alien bomber, a spacecraft from Space: 1999

Military spacecraft bomber projects
These designs are also referred to variously as sub-orbital bombers, antipodal bombers, orbital bombers.

- Blackstar (spaceplane), a suspected USAF black project of the 1990s.
- Amerika Bomber, the Nazi Germany proposal for a very long range bomber, some of which were spacecraft.
  - Silbervogel, a Nazi Germany project from Sanger.
- Mikoyan-Gurevich MiG-105 project options.
- X-20 Dyna-Soar project options.
- Keldysh bomber.
- The stratospheric bomber, a US military project mentioned in Interstellar.
