= V-S Day =

2014 novel by Allen Steele

- First edition cover
- Author: Allen Steele
- Illustrators: Scott Lowther, Ron Miller
- Language: English
- Genre: Alternate history, science fiction
- Publisher: Ace Books
- Publication date: February 2014
- Publication place: United States
- Media type: Hardback
- Pages: 308
- ISBN: 978-0-425-25974-0
- Dewey Decimal: 813'.54—dc23
- LC Class: PS3569.T338425V8 2014

V-S Day: A Novel of Alternate History is a 2014 science fiction novel by American writer Allen Steele. It was first published in the United States in February 2014 by Ace Books. The story is set during an alternate history of World War II and is about a space race between Germany and the United States. Some of the historical figures included in the book are rocket scientists Wernher von Braun and Robert H. Goddard.

V-S Day was nominated for the 2015 Sidewise Award for Alternate History in the category "Best Long Form".

== Plot introduction ==
In Germany in late 1941, Hitler is concerned that Wernher von Braun's development of the V-2 rocket is behind schedule. Hermann Göring suggests that the V-2 should be shelved and Eugen Sänger's proposed spaceplane, Silbervogel (English: Silver bird) be considered instead. When Hitler learns that the Silbervogel would be capable of bombing America from the edge of space, he says "Der Silbervogel fliegen müssen" [sic] (English: The Silver Bird must fly), and instructs von Braun to build it.

In early 1942, the French Resistance uncover Germany's plans to build the Silbervogel and inform the Allies. When American President Franklin D. Roosevelt learns of the threat, he suspends the Manhattan Project and tasks Robert H. Goddard with designing and building the X-1 to intercept the Silbervogel.

The narrative switches between Germany and America in 1942. These chapters focus on rocket scientists von Braun and Goddard and their respective teams of engineers working under extreme pressure to build their spaceplanes as quickly as possible. Occasionally the story moves to 2013 where a reunion of survivors of Goddard's team, the secret 390 Group, takes place. In attendance is a journalist, Douglas Walker. He interviews members of the group, who are more than happy to explain to him what really happened back in 1942, including revealing information that had, until recently, been classified.

== Background ==
The sub-orbital bomber, the Silbervogel (English: Silver bird) that features in V-S Day is based on an actual design proposal that Austrian aerospace engineer Eugen Sänger and German mathematician and physicist Irene Sänger-Bredt made to the Third Reich in 1944. Their design was for a spaceplane that could bomb the United States and return to Europe. But the design was shelved and not revisited until after the war.

Steele said "V-S Day" first began as a novelette, "Operation Blue Horizon", which was published in 1988. The idea for the story came while researching his first book, Orbital Decay (1989) when he stumbled onto references to Sänger's space bomber. Steele stated that he "wasn't completely satisfied" with "Operation Blue Horizon" and rewrote it. This new version of the story was published in Asimov's Science Fiction as "Goddard's People" in 1991. In 1995 Steele published an alternate history novel, The Tranquillity Alternative that drew on the alternate history of "Goddard's People" and a short story of his, "John Harper Wilson", published in 1989.

In 1997 "Goddard's People" was optioned for a film and Steele wrote the screenplay. This gave him an opportunity to expand the story and correct historical mistakes he had made and include new information that had come to light since the publication of the story. The film was never made, but a few years later, Steele expanded the screenplay and turned it into V-S Day.

== Critical reception ==
In a review at Tor.com, Michael M. Jones described V-S Day as "thoughtful and fascinating, [and] as entertaining and well-executed an alternate history as you’re going to find." Jones praised Steele's historical research, his use of historical figures, and the way he works the story into "the cracks of established history". Jones also complimented Steele on his handling of the book's technical content. He said Steele "doesn’t dumb [it] down", but "has that same approachability and love for the mechanics that Heinlein did."

David Marshall wrote in the San Francisco Book Review that "V-S Day is an interesting alternate history novel" with some "very clever" concepts that are "full of possibilities". But he felt that it is "a less than riveting read, [which] is a shame." Marshall stated that despite the urgency of the situation in both the German and American camps, the book conveys "very little sense of threat". He added that despite being forced to work as fast as they can, both teams manage build a plane that "works perfectly the first time", and fires it "into the right place at the right time." Marshall concluded: "Such triumphalism takes the edge off the tension." He gave V-S Day three stars out of five.

In a review of V-S Day in Locus, Russell Letson stated that while he found "Goddard's People", an early version of the novel, "minimally fictionalized journalism", V-S Day "is a fully formed historical-procedural WWII drama". Letson said Steele gives more attention to von Braun than Goddard, but noted that the book is more about rival programs and new technologies than the characters. One disappointment Letson felt was that the book's outcome came as no surprise. He said the 2013 interviews with the survivors of Goddard's team made it clear what had happened long before the end of the book.

Reviewing V-S Day at SFF World, Mark Yon found the novel "great fun ... unravelling ... what is real and what was almost-real". He liked the way Steele includes real people in his story, and noted that while Goddard was driven by patriotism, von Braun was driven by fear. Yon said that even though the story is wrapped up rather quickly, "the general feeling at the end is one of satisfaction." He concluded: "It's not the longest novel, nor the deepest", but readers who enjoy science fiction films from the 1950s, with "their rocket-sleds and their silver ... ships" will find V-S Day "a searing blast of 'what if'."

== Works cited ==
- Steele, Allen (2014). V-S Day. Ace Books. ISBN 978-0-425-25974-0.
