= Kryštofovy Hamry =

- Municipality
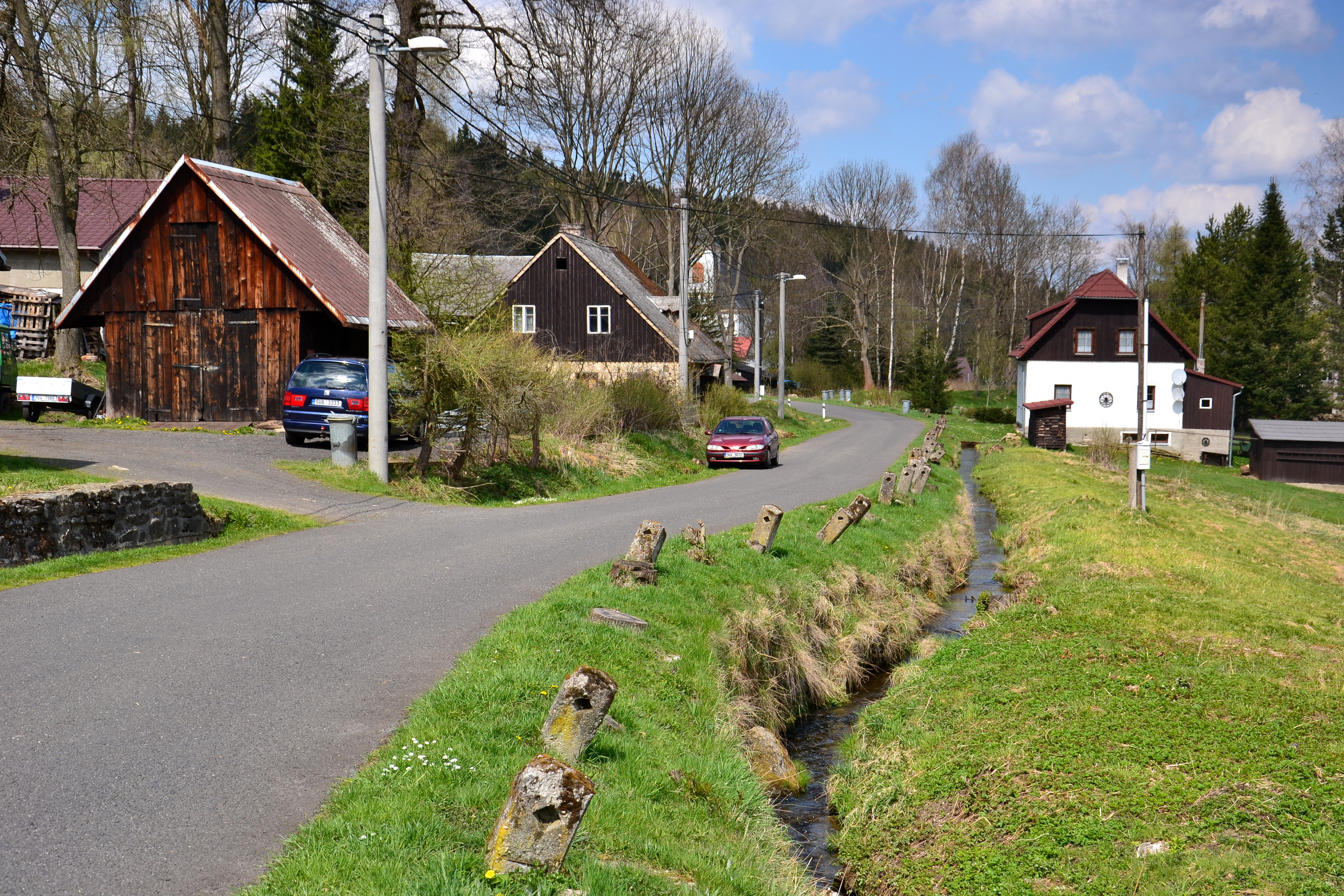
- Main street in Kryštofovy Hamry

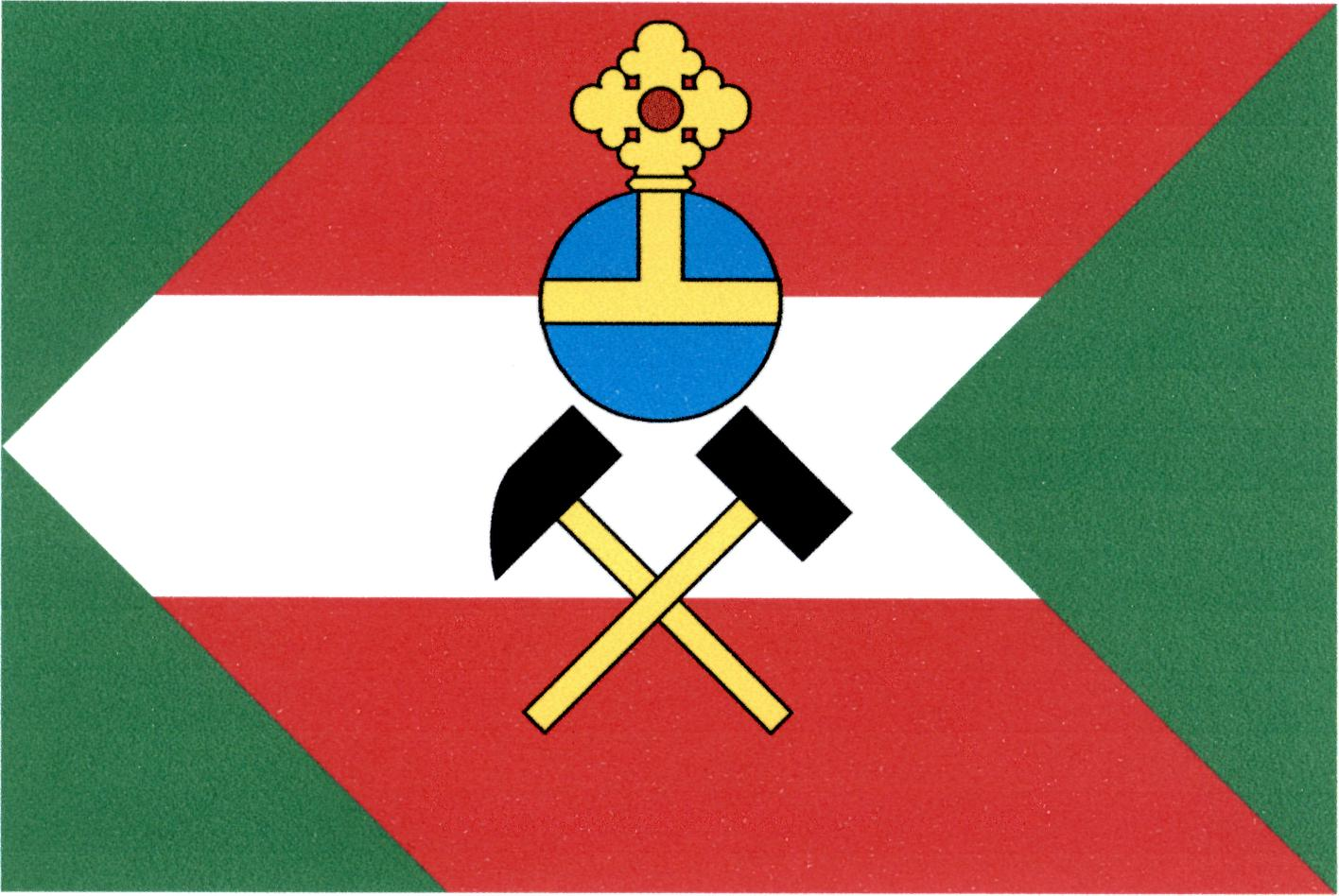
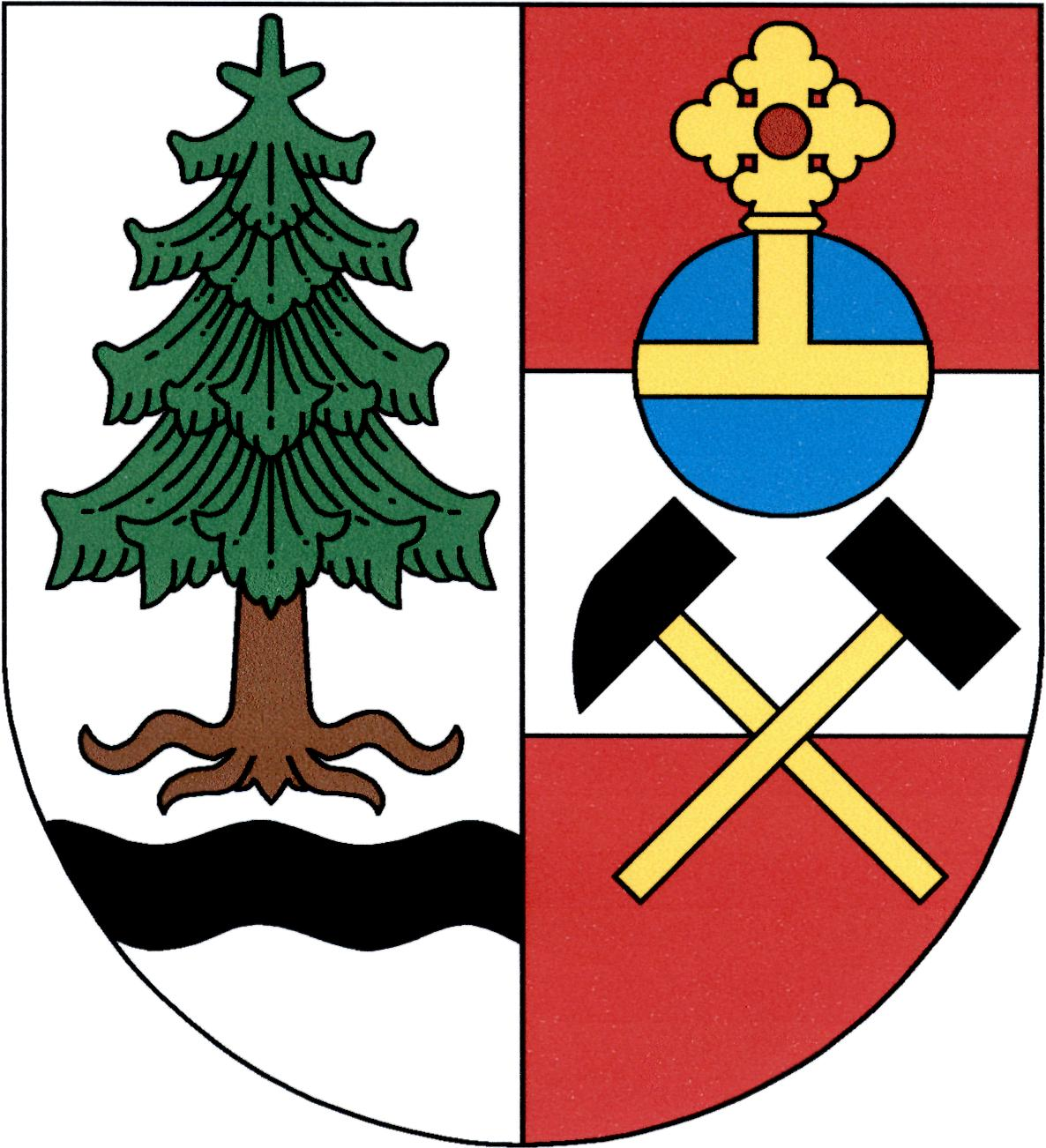
- Flag Coat of arms

- Location in the Czech Republic
- Coordinates: 50°29′58″N 13°8′10″E
- Country: Czech Republic
- Region: Ústí nad Labem
- District: Chomutov
- First mentioned: 1720

Area
  - Total: 68.42 km^{2} (26.42 sq mi)
- Elevation: 680 m (2,230 ft)

Population (2026-01-01)
  - Total: 155
  - Density: 2.27/km^{2} (5.87/sq mi)
- Time zone: UTC+1 (CET)
  - Summer (DST): UTC+2 (CEST)
- Postal code: 431 91
- Website: www.krystofovyhamry.cz

Kryštofovy Hamry (German: Christophhammer) is a municipality and village in Chomutov District in the Ústí nad Labem Region of the Czech Republic. It has about 200 inhabitants.

== Administrative division ==
Kryštofovy Hamry consists of four municipal parts (in brackets population according to the 2021 census):

- Kryštofovy Hamry (129)
- Černý Potok (31)
- Mezilesí (2)
- Rusová (0)

The former town of Přísečnice was also located in what is today the territory of Kryštofovy Hamry.

== Etymology ==
The name Kryštofovy Hamry means "Kryštof's (Christopher's) hammer mills" in Czech. The village is named after Christopher (Kryštof) Grad of Grünberg, who founded here a hammer mill and named it after St. Christopher.

== Geography ==
Kryštofovy Hamry is located about 19 km (12 mi) west of Chomutov and 34 km (21 mi) southeast of Karlovy Vary. The municipality borders Germany in the north. It is adjacent to the German town of Jöhstadt. Kryštofovy Hamry lies in the Ore Mountains. The highest point is the mountain Jelení hora at 994 m (3,261 ft) above sea level.

The central part of the municipality is formed by the Přísečnice Reservoir, built on the Preßnitz River (Czech: Přísečnice). The reservoir was built in 1969–1976 and serves as a source of drinking water for the region.

== History ==
The area was part of the Přísečnice estate. At the beginning of the 15th century, first hammer mills were established there, but they were destroyed during the Hussite Wars. Kryštof Grad of Grünberg founded here a new hammer mill between 1621 and 1625 and named him after St. Christopher. A brickyard was built next to the hammer mill in 1660, but the village did not yet exist at that time. The first written mention of the village of Kryštofovy Hamry is from 1720. In the 19th century, various manufactories were established in the village.

== Demographics ==
Historical population

Year	Pop.	±%
1869	7,257	—
1880	8,766	+20.8%
1890	9,177	+4.7%
1900	10,427	+13.6%
1910	9,677	−7.2%

Year	Pop.	±%
1921	7,270	−24.9%
1930	7,225	−0.6%
1950	1,492	−79.3%
1961	1,340	−10.2%
1970	828	−38.2%

Year	Pop.	±%
1980	129	−84.4%
1991	88	−31.8%
2001	89	+1.1%
2011	81	−9.0%
2021	162	+100.0%

Source: Censuses

== Transport ==
The train stop called Rusová is located on the railway line Chomutov–Cranzahl. However, trains run on it only on weekends in the summer season.

== Sights ==
The main landmark of Kryštofovy Hamry is the Church of Saint Christopher. It was built in 1829–1832.

== Notable people ==
- Richard Markgraf (1869–1916), palaeontologist
- Eugen Sänger (1905–1964), Austrian aerospace engineer
