= Keldysh bomber =

Soviet sub-orbital bomber project

The Keldysh bomber was a Soviet design for a rocket-powered sub-orbital bomber spaceplane, which drew heavily upon work carried out by Eugen Sänger and Irene Bredt for the German Silbervogel project.

== Development ==
During the closing weeks of World War II, the German work at Peenemünde was investigated by Soviet intelligence, amongst whom was rocket motor constructor Aleksei Isaev, who found a copy of a report by Sänger and Bredt titled "A Rocket Drive for Long Range Bombers". A translation was soon circulating among Soviet rocket designers, and a condensed version made its way to Stalin himself.

In November 1946 the NII-1 NKAP research institute was formed with mathematician Mstislav Keldysh as its head to investigate and develop the German Sänger–Bredt design. In 1947, studies indicated that the high fuel consumption of Sänger's rocket-based design rendered the concept impracticable in the short term. Using engines considered to be available in a reasonable timespan, 95% of the vehicle's initial mass would have to be propellant. However, use of a rocket driven slide for the takeoff run and ramjets during the atmospheric acceleration phase would be more efficient than the original concept and could give the craft a more reasonable 22% dead weight and still achieve the 5 km·s^{−1} velocity required for a 12000 km intercontinental range. The mission would be started using five to six rocket engines RKDS-100, burning LOX/Kerosene and driving a sled including the bomber mounted on top with a total thrust of 5 to 6 MN running on a 3 km long track. After horizontal acceleration with approximate 5 g for about 10 to 11 s up to a speed of 500 m/s the craft would separate and lift off, still driven by its single on-board RKDS-100 rocket engine delivering about 1 MN thrust, but now supported by two more fuel efficient wingtip mounted ramjets. After passing 60,000 ft (18,000 m) altitude, reaching a speed of Mach 3 and the flame out of the ramjets, the still burning rocket engine would allow leaving the atmosphere and reaching a sub-orbital flight path. It was estimated that this ambiguous development would take until the mid-1950s before a draft project of a feasible design could be prepared, and by that time the design had been made obsolete by more advanced designs. However, the work carried out lead to the EKR, MKR, Buran, and Burya ramjet cruise missiles. But when Burya reached the flight-ready status, the era of the much more powerful ICBM R-7 has already began.

== Proposed mission profile ==
- The 100-tonne craft would be accelerated to 500 m/s using a sled running along a 3 km track and powered by five or six RKDS-100 rocket engines of 600 tonnes total thrust. Separation velocity would be reached 11 seconds after ignition.
- After separation from the sled, the craft would climb using its main RKDS-100 rocket engine and two wingtip-mounted ramjets, which would accelerate it to an altitude of 20 km and a speed of over Mach 3.
- The rocket would continue working after the ramjets had flamed out at high altitude; it had a specific impulse of 285 seconds, a thrust of 100 tonnes, and used liquid oxygen/kerosene propellants.

== Specifications ==
=== General characteristics ===
- Function: Sub-orbital bomber
- Launch mass: 100000 kg
- Total length: 28 m
- Launch platform: Rocket sled
- Status: Canceled

=== Launch sled (stage 0) ===
- Engine: 5/6 × RKDS-100 rocket engines
- Length: 14 m (45 ft)
- Diameter: 3.6 m (11.8 ft)
- Thrust: 5880 kN (1321870 lb_{F})
- Oxidizer: LOx
- Combustible: Kerosene

=== Keldysh bomber (stage 1) ===
- Engine: 1 × RKDS-100 rocket, 2 × ramjets
- Speed : Mach 3
- Range: 12000 km
- Flight altitude:
- Warhead:
- Length: 28.0 m
- Diameter: 3.6 m
- Wing span: 15 m
- Wing area: 126 m²

== See also ==
- Silbervogel
- Spacecraft propulsion
- X-20 Dynasoar
