= MKR =

MKR may refer to

- Interdynamics MKR, a Swedish assault rifle prototype
- Lincoln MKR, an automobile
- Magic Knight Rayearth, a Japanese manga series
- Meekatharra Airport, IATA airport code "MKR"
- MKR (missile), a Soviet cruise missile study 1957–1960
- My Kitchen Rules, an Australian reality television series
  - My Kitchen Rules NZ, a New Zealand adaptation
  - My Kitchen Rules SA, a South African adaptation
  - My Kitchen Rules (British TV series), a British and Irish adaptation
  - My Kitchen Rules (U.S. TV series), an American adaptation
