= Schwarzwasser (Preßnitz) =

River in Germany and the Czech Republic

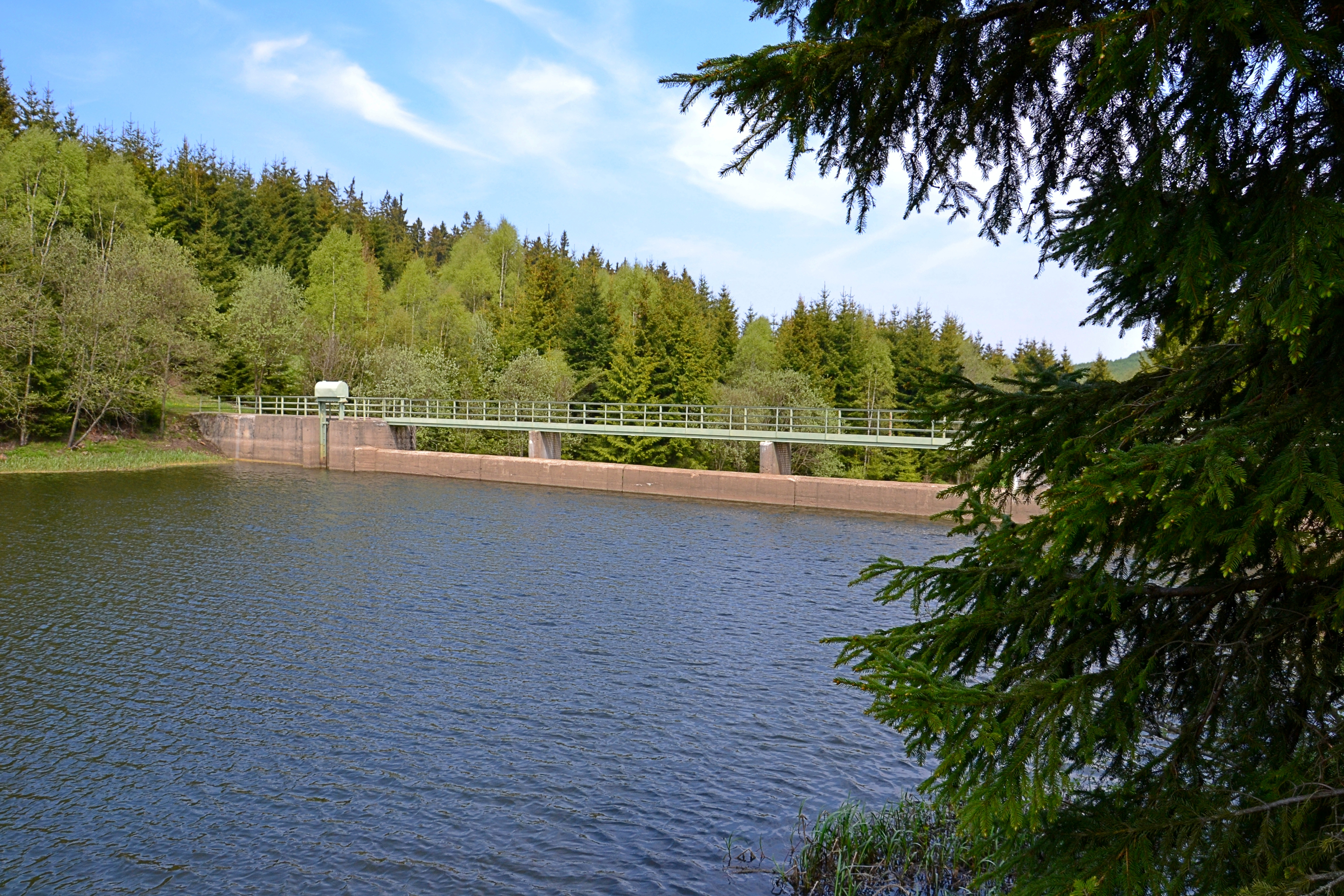
- The weir below Kovářská

Location
- Countries: Czech Republic; Germany
- Region: Ústí nad Labem
- State: Saxony

Physical characteristics
- Mouth
  - location: Preßnitz
  - coordinates: 50.5301°N 13.1299°E

Basin features
- Progression: Preßnitz→ Zschopau→ Freiberger Mulde→ Mulde→ Elbe→ North Sea

The Schwarzwasser (Czech: Černá Voda) is a river in Bohemia (Czech Republic) and Saxony (Germany). It is a left tributary of the Preßnitz, which it joins near Jöhstadt.

== See also ==
- List of rivers of Saxony
- List of rivers of the Czech Republic
