= Jabal Hamzah ballistic missile test and launch facility =

Egyptian missile test facility

Jabal Hamzah Ballistic Missile Test and Launch Facility
- قاعدة إطلاق و اختبار الصواريخ الباليستية بجبل حمزة
- Part of the Egyptian Army
- near 6th October City and Sheikh Zayed City, Giza, Cairo in Egypt

Site information
- Type: Missile launch facility
- Owner: Egyptian Armed Forces
- Operator: Egyptian Army
- Open to the public: No
- Condition: Unknown

Location
- Location of Jabal Hamzah Ballistic Missile Test and Launch Facility
- Coordinates: 30°07′32.7″N 30°36′18.5″E
- Area: Unknown

Site history
- Built: Late 1950s
- Battles/wars: Yom Kippur War
- Events: Al Zafir and Al Kahir SRBMs testing

Ballistic missile test and launch facility was built in the late 1950s and it is the oldest functioning ballistic missile installation in the developing world, located near Jabal Hamzah 62 kilometres (39 mi) west-northwest of Cairo.

== History ==
After Egypt's defeat in 1948 Arab-Israeli War, Egypt started the missile program and became interested in ballistic missiles after the presidency of Gamal Abdel Nasser and the 1956 Suez Crisis, as the importance of ballistic missiles had arisen to penetrate Israeli airspace.

Egypt attempted to acquire ballistic missiles from the Soviet Union but failed and then Egypt focused on the indigenous rocket program that was developed by German scientists based on German V-2, Wasserfall and the French Véronique rockets technology in 1960.

During the late 1950s, Egypt constructed the Jabal Hamzah ballistic missile facility to conduct test fires.

=== Chronology of events at Jabal Hamzah ballistic missile facility ===
- July 1962 - four successful test flights of single stage, liquid fueled rockets of Al Zafir and Al Kahir SRBMs.
- 23 September 1971 - launch of Al Kahir rocket.
- 6 October 1973 - launch of Al Kahir rocket.

== Overview ==
In 2010, an analysis had been published using satellite imagery from commercial sources that shows between 2001 and 2009, Jabal Hamzah facility experienced an increase in activity and expansion as new constructions took place including a new missile launch pad and horizontal processing building.

== See also ==
- List of rocket launch sites
