= Russell L. Rogers =

US Air Force pilot and astronaut (1928–1967)

- Born: April 12, 1928; Lawrence, Kansas, U.S.
- Died: September 13, 1967 (aged 39); Kadena AFB, Okinawa, Japan
- Other name: Russell Lee Rogers
- Education: University of Colorado, B.S. 1958
- Occupation: Test pilot
- Space career

USAF astronaut
- Rank: Lieutenant Colonel, USAF
- Selection: 1960 Dyna-Soar Group 1
- Missions: None

Russell Lee Rogers (April 12, 1928 – September 13, 1967), (Lt Col, USAF), was an American electrical engineer, U.S. Air Force officer, test pilot, and astronaut in the X-20 Dyna-Soar program.

== Early life and education ==
Rogers was born on April 12, 1928, in Lawrence, Kansas. He received a Bachelor of Science degree in electrical engineering from the University of Colorado in 1958. He was married with five children.

== Test pilot ==
Rogers flew 142 missions as a fighter pilot during the Korean War. As a USAF Test Pilot School graduate, he was an experimental test pilot at Edwards AFB, California. During this assignment, Rogers served as a key member of the team that tested the Northrop T-38 Talon jet trainer. He was also a member of the Society of Experimental Test Pilots. In April 1960, he was selected for the X-20 program. After several years supporting the Boeing-led program as a pilot consultant, Rogers left the X-20 program on December 10, 1963, when it was cancelled.

After the X-20 program, he remained in the U.S. Air Force on active flight duty as a pilot and was commander of the 12th Tactical Fighter Squadron with the rank of Lt. Colonel at the time of his death.

== Death ==
Rogers was killed when the engine of his F-105 fighter plane failed near Kadena AFB, Okinawa, Japan on September 13, 1967. He ejected from his aircraft, but his parachute failed to deploy properly. He was 39 years old.
