= Henry Charles Gordon =

Henry C. Gordon
- Born: December 23, 1925; Valparaiso, Indiana, U.S.
- Died: September 24, 1996 (aged 70); Peoria, Arizona, U.S.
- Other name: Henry Charles Gordon
- Education: Purdue University, B.S. 1950; University of Southern California, MBA 1966
- Occupation: Test pilot
- Space career

USAF astronaut
- Rank: Colonel, USAF
- Selection: 1960 Dyna-Soar Group 1
- Missions: None

Henry Charles Gordon (December 23, 1925 – September 24, 1996) (Col, USAF) was an American aeronautical engineer, U.S. Air Force officer, test pilot, and astronaut in the X-20 Dyna-Soar program.

== Early life and education ==
Gordon was born in Valparaiso, Indiana, on December 23, 1925. In 1950 he earned his Bachelor of Science degree in Aeronautical Engineering from Purdue University, and in 1966 he earned his Master of Business Administration degree from the University of Southern California. He was married and had four children.

== Test pilot ==
Gordon was in the Air Force, and flew combat missions in the Korean and Vietnam wars. He was selected as an astronaut in the X-20 Dyna-Soar program in April 1962 and began training at the Air Force Flight Test Center, Edwards Air Force Base, California.

He retired as an astronaut when the Dyna-Soar program was cancelled on December 10, 1963, having never flown in space. He remained in the U.S. Air Force after the Dyna-Soar program was cancelled and retired from the Air Force with the rank of Colonel.

== Death ==
Gordon died in Peoria, Arizona on September 24, 1996, age 70.
