= Al-Zafir (missile) =

Egyptian ballistic missile

Al-Zafir was a liquid propellant short-range ballistic missile developed by Eugen Sänger at the Jabal Hamzah ballistic missile test and launch facility for Egypt. Its length was 6.1 m, diameter 0.61 m, range was 376 km and payload was 500 kg. It was cancelled in 1962.
