= Preßnitz =

River in Germany and the Czech Republic

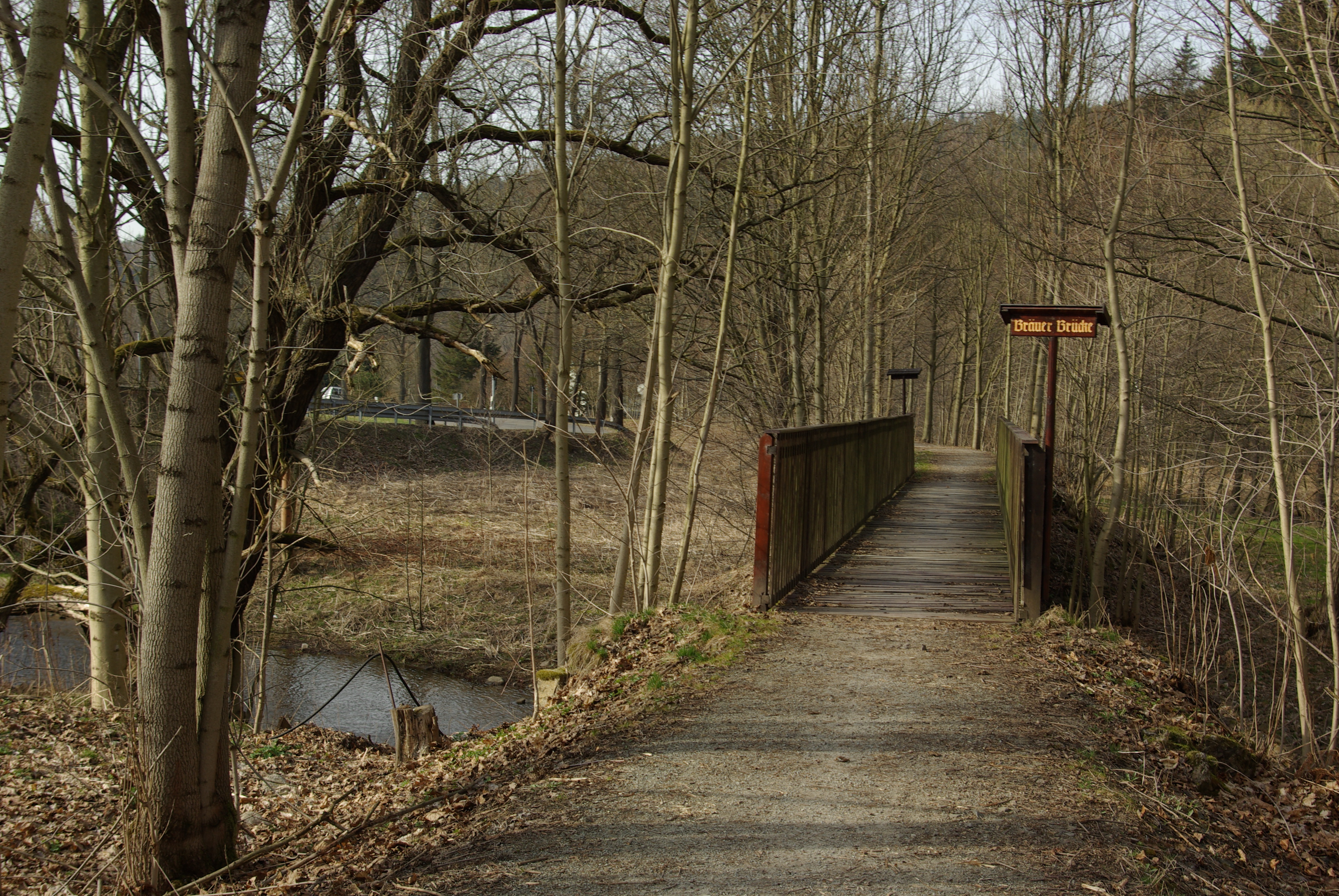

Location
- Countries: Czech Republic; Germany
- Region: Ústí nad Labem
- State: Saxony

Physical characteristics
- Source
  - location: Source region: Near Horní Halže
  - coordinates: 50°25′12″N 13°04′23″E
- Mouth
  - location: Near Wolkenstein into the Zschopau
  - coordinates: 50°38′17″N 13°04′12″E
  - elevation: 395.5 m (1,298 ft)

Basin features
- Progression: Zschopau→ Freiberger Mulde→ Mulde→ Elbe→ North Sea

The Preßnitz (Czech: Přísečnice) is a right-hand tributary of the Zschopau River in the state of Saxony in eastern Germany and in the Czech Republic. It rises in the Bohemian part of the Ore Mountains near Horní Halže.

== Course ==
The upper section of the Preßnitz, through the mining areas of Mezilesí to its confluence with the stream Hammerbach from Dolina, was formerly known as the Hammerlebach.

Along the rest of the Preßnitz as it flows northwards are the old mining town of Přísečnice, which was blown up in 1973 along with the neighbouring villages of Rusová and Dolina, in order to dam the Preßnitz at that point and form a reservoir. In 1976, the Přisečnice Reservoir was completed.

At the first village in Saxony that the Preßnitz flows through, Schmalzgrube, it is joined by the Schwarzwasser stream from Jöhstadt.

Above the town of Wolkenstein the Preßnitz finally discharges into the Zschopau.

== Industry ==
Due to the iron ore deposits in the area there were many hammer mills along the Preßnitz in the past, for example in Schmalzgrube, Oberschmiedeberg, Mittelschmiedeberg und Niederschmiedeberg.

North of the dam on the border with Saxony is the village of Kryštofovy Hamry, in which one of the seven factories that manufactured cobalt blue paint in Bohemia, the Blaufarbenwerk St. Christoph, was located until 1874.

From 1955 to 2001 refrigerators were manufactured at Niederschmiedeberg. In 1993 the factory developed the first chlorofluorocarbon- and fluorocarbon-free refrigerators under the trade name of FORON.

On the way to Steinbach in the Preßnitz Valley is the show mine of Andreas Gegentrum Stolln.

== Railway ==
From 1892 to 1986 the Pressnitz Valley Railway ran between Wolkenstein and Schmalzgrube, parallel to the Preßnitz River. After its closure a walking and cycling path was built between Wolkenstein and Steinbach on the old railway embankment along which the course of the river can be followed. Between 1995 and 2000 a museum railway was built between Steinbach and Schmalzgrube on the old embankment.

== See also ==
- List of rivers of Saxony
- List of rivers of the Czech Republic

== Sources ==
- Bernd Schreiter: Hammerwerke im Preßnitz- und Schwarzwassertal. Streifzüge durch die Geschichte des oberen Erzgebirges. Heft 14. Annaberg-Buchholz 1997. Download (pdf 200 KB)
