= Richard Markgraf =

Czech paleontologist

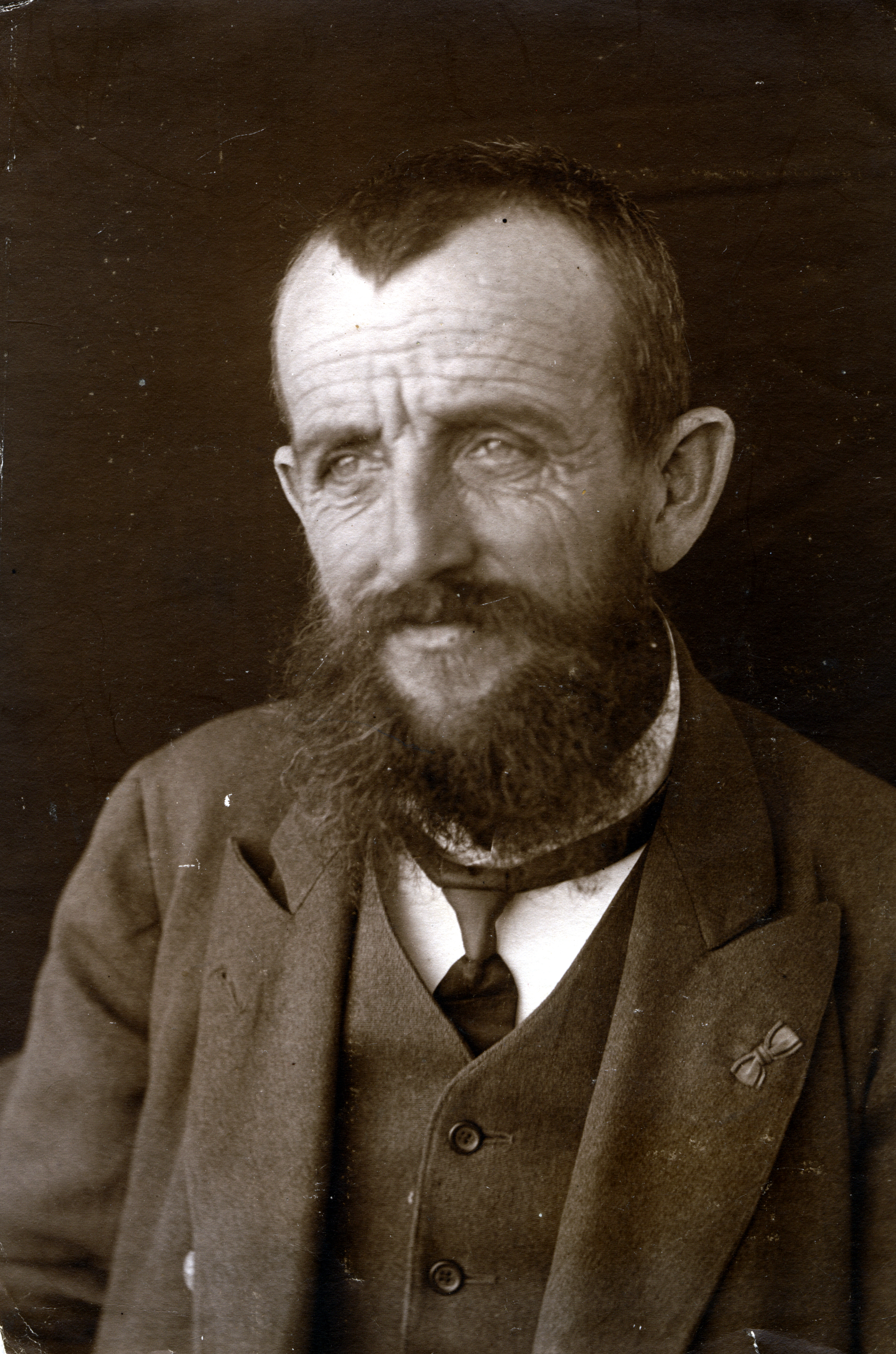
- Markgraf in 1900
- Born: 13 March 1869; Pressnitz, Austria-Hungary (now extinct Přísečnice, the Czech Republic)
- Died: January-March 1916 (aged 46)
- Known for: discovery of Spinosaurus
- Scientific career
- Fields: Paleontology

Richard Markgraf (13 March 1869 – January-March 1916) was a German Bohemian paleontologist. He is best remembered for his expeditions to Egypt, which discovered the first known remains of many extinct fossil reptiles, such as Aegyptosaurus, Tameryraptor and Spinosaurus.

== Early life ==
Richard Markgraf was born in Přísečnice, Austria-Hungary (now the Czech Republic) on 13 March 1869 and he became a bricklayer before joining one of the travelling Preßnitz music groups until he eventually ended up impoverished in Cairo, Egypt, working as a pianist in the Shepheard's Hotel.

He eventually met the German palaeontologist Eberhard Fraas in 1897 who hired him because of his knowledge of Arabic and he taught Markgraf the basic techniques of fossil hunting; he subsequently worked as a collector for Fraas.

== Career in Egypt with Stromer ==
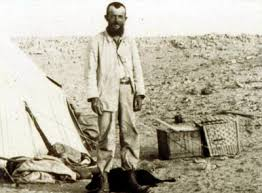
Markgraf in the Fayum, 14 May 1907

Markgraf eventually met Ernst Stromer during the winter of 1901–02 and the two got along very well. Markgraf was Stromer's Sammler, or fossil collector, for 10½ years, and became a close friend of Stromer. Markgraf, however, was often ill by this time. It is unclear whether the cause was malaria, intestinal bleeding from typhoid, or chronic amebic dysentery.

It was during the expeditions with Stromer where many of his notable discoveries were made, such as Aegyptosaurus during the early 1910s, Spinosaurus in 1912 and Bahariasaurus in 1911. Because of his discoveries, he was awarded the Medal of Merit of the Royal Order of Württemberg in 1904 and also the Bene-Merenti Medal (in silver) from the Bavarian Academy of Sciences in 1902.

He is known to have worked for weeks at a time during the winter of 1912–13.

=== 1907 Fayum expedition ===
He also met another palaeontologist, Henry Fairfield Osborn, when his 1907 expedition to the Faiyum Oasis accidentally stumbled across Markgraf while he was collecting fossils for Stromer, and despite a language barrier, Markgraf began to also collect fossils for Osborn for six weeks during this 1907 expedition, which became a success after the discovery of the Jebel Qatrani Formation, which is a large Oligocene fossil deposit within the oasis.

== Later life ==
Stationed at Ain Gedid in Egypt, Markgraf stopped collecting upon the request of Stromer in April 1914 and after the outbreak of the First World War in 1914, Markgraf lost his main source of income because his fossil collecting was reduced on British soil (he mainly collected in Egypt), leading him to fall back into poverty again, with the last known fossil that he found being Tameryraptor markgrafi in early April 1914.

Markgraf stopped collecting upon the request of Stromer in April 1914, with the last known fossil that he found being the dinosaur Tameryraptor markgrafi. He then returned to Cairo to begin the process of shipping the fossils to Munich (which would not be completed until 1922), but the outbreak of the First World War in July 1914 halted this process, and because Markgraf would not be paid until the fossils reached Stromer in Germany, Markgraf would quickly lose his main source of income because his fossil collecting was reduced on British soil (he mainly collected in Egypt), leading him to fall back into poverty again.

The Egyptian government refused to send the shipment to Munich as they viewed all German citizens as being "suspicious"; Markgraf wrote to the British and Egyptian authorities about the release of the fossils but they declined his request and Stromer did not receive the shipment until it arrived in Munich eight years later in 1922.

=== Death ===
In early 1916, Stromer received a letter from Markgraf's wife in which she said that Markgraf had died from an unknown illness aged 46; this illness was likely one of the ones that he had been suffering from in 1901 when he first met Stromer.

His wife, who became destitute upon her husband's death, was paid a fee for the shipment of the fossils.

== Legacy ==
The dinosaur Tameryraptor markgrafi was named after Richard Markgraf in 2025.
