= Silbervogel =

Proposed sub-orbital bomber

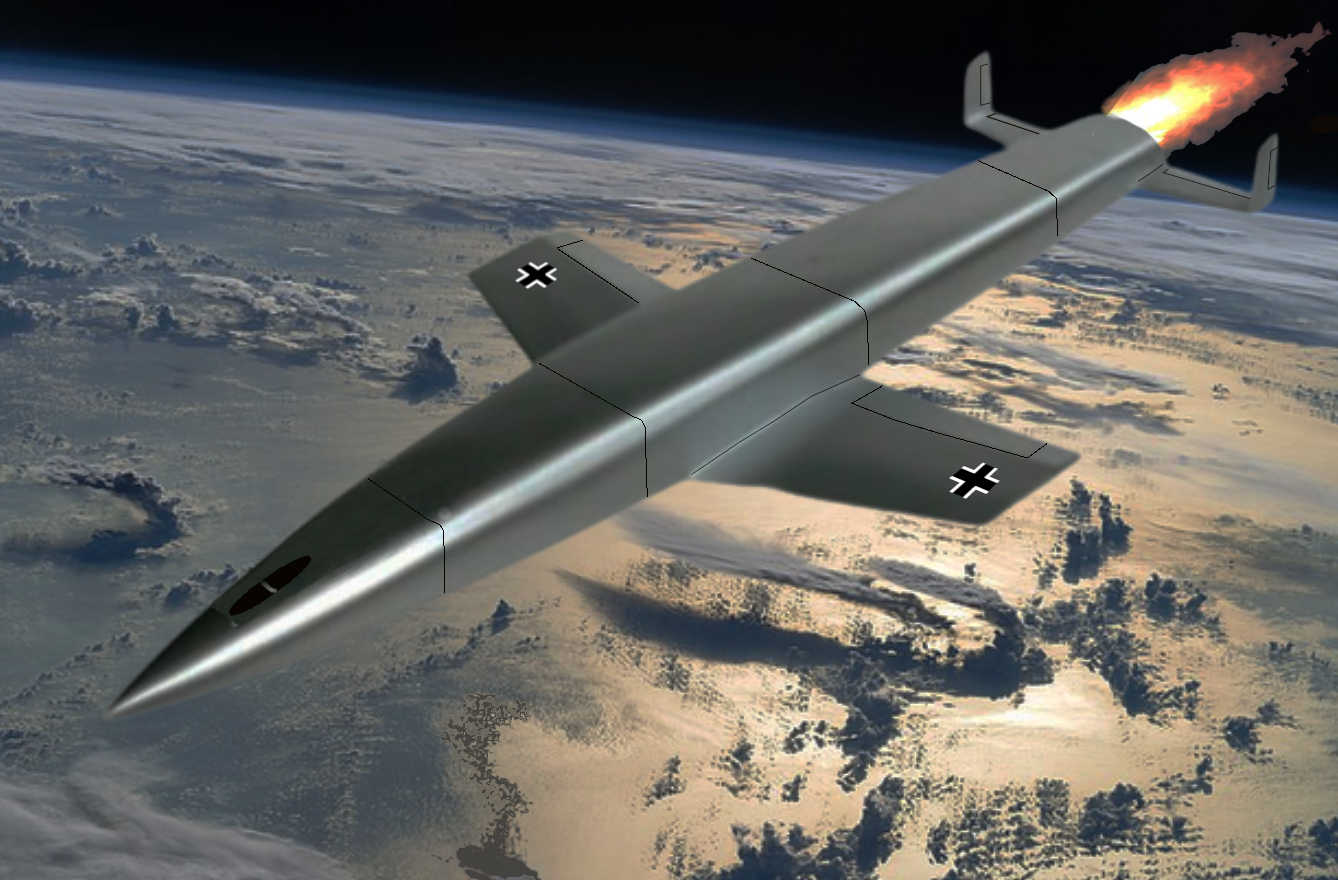

General information
- Type: Bomber
- Status: Project
- Primary user: Luftwaffe
- Number built: None

Silbervogel (German for "silver bird") was a design for a liquid-propellant rocket-powered sub-orbital bomber produced by Eugen Sänger and Irene Bredt in the late 1930s for the Third Reich. It is also known as the RaBo (Raketenbomber – "rocket bomber"). It was one of a number of designs considered for the Amerikabomber project, which started in the spring of 1942, being focused solely on trans-Atlantic-range piston-engined strategic bombers such as the Messerschmitt Me 264 and the Junkers Ju 390, the only two airframe types which were actually built and flown for the competition. When Walter Dornberger attempted to create interest in military spaceplanes in the United States after World War II he chose the more diplomatic term antipodal bomber.

== Concept ==
The design incorporated new rocket technology and the principle of the lifting body, foreshadowing future development of winged spacecraft such as the X-20 Dyna-Soar of the 1960s and the Space Shuttle of the 1970s. In the end, it was considered too complex and expensive to produce. The design never went beyond the mock-up stage.

The Silbervogel was intended to fly long distances in a series of short hops. The aircraft was to have begun its mission propelled along a 3 km (2 mi) long rail track by a large rocket-powered sled to about 1,930 km/h (1,200 mph). Once airborne, it was to fire its own rocket engine and continue to climb to an altitude of 145 km (90 mi), at which point it would be travelling at about 21,800 km/h (13,500 mph). It would then gradually descend into the stratosphere, where the increasing air density would generate lift against the flat underside of the aircraft, eventually causing it to "bounce" and gain altitude again, where this pattern would be repeated. Because of aerodynamic drag, each bounce would be shallower than the preceding one, but it was still calculated that the Silbervogel would be able to cross the Atlantic, deliver a 4,000 kg (8,800 lb) bomb to the continental United States, and then continue its flight to a landing site somewhere in the Empire of Japan–held Pacific, a total journey of 19,000 to 24,000 km (12,000 to 15,000 mi).

Postwar analysis of the Silbervogel design involving a mathematical control analysis unearthed a computational error. It turned out that the heat flow during the initial atmospheric re-entry would have been much greater than the original one calculated by Sänger and Bredt. Hence, if the design had been actually constructed, it would have been destroyed by the heat, which would have exceeded design limits and melted the craft. The problem could have been solved by augmenting the heat shield, but this would have reduced the craft's payload capacity significantly, reducing its use for the intended mission of bombing distant areas.

== History ==
On 3 December 1941 Sänger sent his initial proposal for a suborbital glider to the Reichsluftfahrtministerium (RLM) as Geheime Kommandosache Nr. 4268/LXXX5. The 900-page proposal was regarded with disfavor at the RLM due to its size and complexity and was filed away. Then Sänger went to work on more modest projects such as the Skoda-Kauba Sk P.14 ramjet fighter.

Professor Walter Gregorii had Sänger rework his report, and a greatly reduced version was submitted to the RLM in September 1944, as UM 3538. It was the first serious proposal for a vehicle which could carry a pilot and payload to the lower edge of space.

Two manned and one unmanned version were proposed: the Antipodenferngleiter (antipodal long-range glider) and the Interglobalferngleiter (interglobal long-range glider). Both were to be launched from a rocket-powered sled. The two manned versions were identical, except in payload. The Antipodenferngleiter was to be launched at a very steep angle (which would shorten the range) and after dropping its bomb load on New York City was to land at a Japanese base in the Pacific.

== Postwar ==
After the war ended, Sänger and Bredt worked for the French government and in 1949 founded the Fédération Astronautique. Whilst in France, Sänger was the subject of a botched attempt by Soviet agents to win him over. Joseph Stalin had become intrigued by reports of the Silbervogel design and sent his son Vasily and scientist Grigori Tokaty to kidnap Sänger and Bredt and bring them to the USSR. When this plan failed, a new design bureau was set up by Mstislav Vsevolodovich Keldysh in 1946 to research the idea. A new version powered by ramjets instead of a rocket engine was developed, usually known as the Keldysh bomber, but not produced. The design formed the basis for a number of additional cruise missile designs into the early 1960s, none of which were produced.

In the US, a similar project, the X-20 Dyna-Soar, was to be launched on a Titan II booster. As the crewed space role moved to NASA, and uncrewed reconnaissance satellites were thought to be capable of all required missions, the United States Air Force gradually withdrew from crewed space flight, and Dyna-Soar was cancelled.

One lasting impact of the Silverbird project is the "regenerative cooling–regenerative engine" design, in which fuel or oxidizer is run in tubes around the engine bell to cool the bell and pressurize the fluid. The concept had been known for a long time, but Sänger's team made important work towards its practical use. Almost all modern rocket engines use a similar design.

== Sänger (Raumtransportsystem) ==
On 18 October 1985 Messerschmitt-Bölkow-Blohm (MBB) began renewed studies of the Sänger spaceplane, now a "piggyback" two-stage-to-orbit horizontal takeoff concept.

== See also ==
- Boost-glide
- Keldysh bomber
- Spacecraft propulsion
- Blue Streak (missile)
- Rocket sled launch
