= Boeing X-20 Dyna-Soar =

Research spaceplane by Boeing

X-20 Dyna-Soar
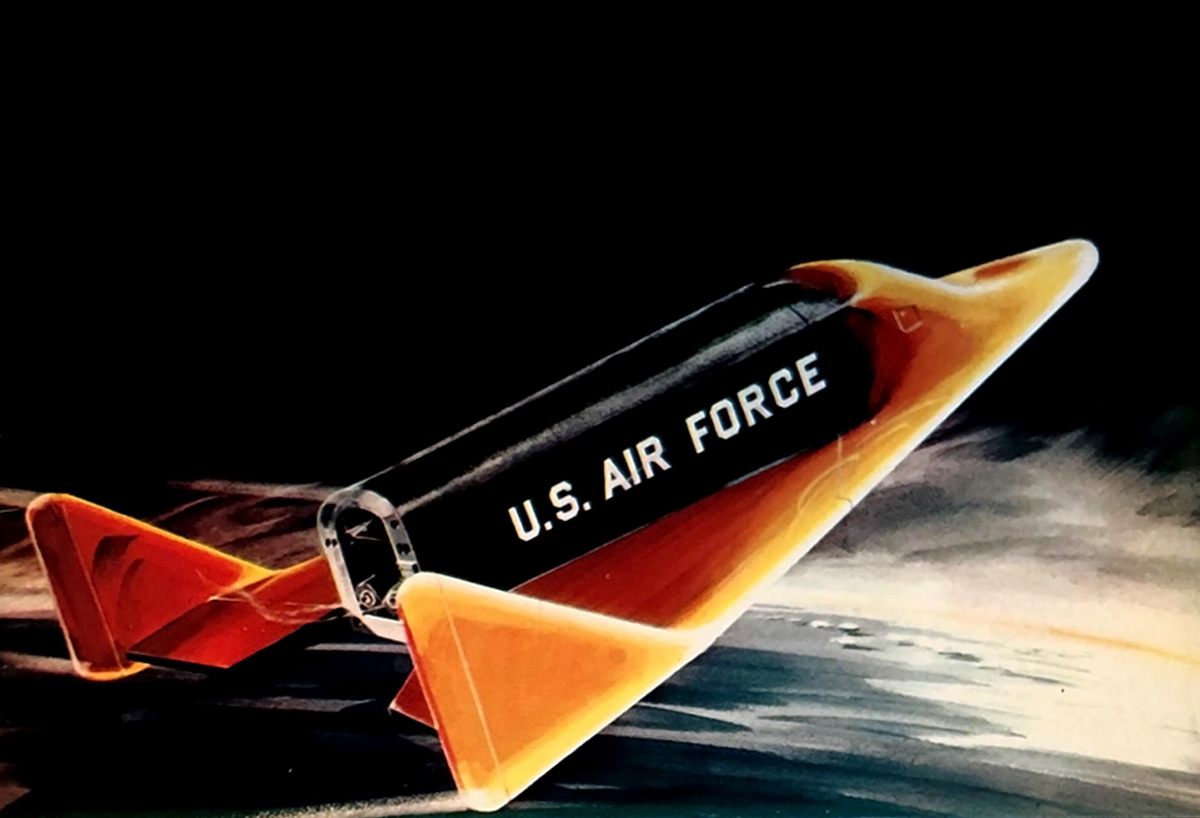
- Artist's impression of the X-20 during re-entry
- Country of origin: United States

Specifications
- Crew capacity: 1

Production
- Status: Canceled just after spacecraft construction had begun
- Maiden launch: 1 January 1966 (proposed)
- Last launch: 1 March 1968 (proposed)

The Boeing X-20 Dyna-Soar ("Dynamic Soarer") was a United States Air Force (USAF) program to develop a spaceplane that could be used for a variety of military missions, including aerial reconnaissance, bombing, space rescue, satellite maintenance, and as a space interceptor to sabotage enemy satellites. The program ran from 24 October 1957, to 10 December 1963, cost US$660 million ($6.94 billion in 2024 dollars), and was cancelled just after spacecraft construction had begun.

Other spacecraft under development at the time, such as Mercury or Vostok, were space capsules with ballistic re-entry profiles that ended in a landing under a parachute. Dyna-Soar was more like an aircraft. It could travel to distant targets at the speed of an intercontinental ballistic missile, was designed to glide to Earth like an aircraft under the control of a pilot, and could land at an airfield. Dyna-Soar could also reach Earth orbit, like conventional, crewed space capsules.

These characteristics made Dyna-Soar a far more advanced concept than other human spaceflight missions of the period. Research into a spaceplane was realized much later in other reusable spacecraft such as the 1981–2011 Space Shuttle and the more recent Boeing X-40 and X-37B spacecraft.

== Background ==
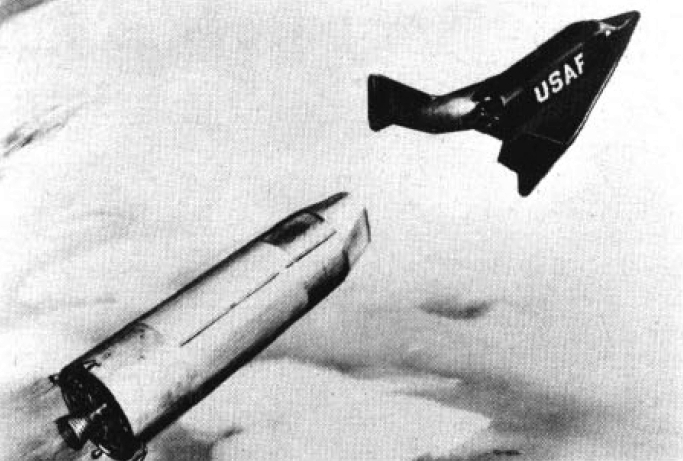
Artist's conception of an X-20 Dyna-Soar after separation from booster (1961)

The concept underlying the X-20 was developed in Germany during World War II by Eugen Sänger and Irene Bredt as part of the 1941 Silbervogel proposal. This was a design for a rocket-powered bomber able to attack New York City from bases in Germany and then fly on for landing somewhere in the Pacific Ocean held by the Empire of Japan. The idea would be to use the vehicle's wings to generate lift and pull up into a new ballistic trajectory, exiting the atmosphere again and giving the vehicle time to cool off between the skips. After the war, it was demonstrated that the heating load during the skips was much higher than initially calculated and would have melted the spacecraft.

Following the war, many German scientists were taken to the United States by the Office of Strategic Services's Operation Paperclip, bringing with them detailed knowledge of the Silbervogel project. Among them, Walter Dornberger and Krafft Ehricke moved to Bell Aircraft, where, in 1952, they proposed what was essentially a vertical launch version of Silbervogel known as the "Bomber Missile", or "BoMi".

These studies all proposed various rocket-powered vehicles that could travel vast distances by gliding after being boosted to high speed and altitude by a rocket stage. The rocket booster would place the vehicle onto a suborbital, but exoatmospheric, trajectory, resulting in a brief spaceflight followed by re-entry into the atmosphere. Instead of a full re-entry and landing, the vehicle would use the lift from its wings to redirect its glide angle upward, trading horizontal velocity for vertical velocity. In this way, the vehicle would be "bounced" back into space again. This skip-glide method would repeat until the speed was low enough that the pilot of the vehicle would need to pick a landing spot and glide the vehicle to a landing. This use of hypersonic atmospheric lift meant that the vehicle could greatly extend its range over a ballistic trajectory using the same rocket booster.

There was enough interest in BoMi that by 1956 it had evolved into three separate programs:

- RoBo (Rocket Bomber), an updated version of BoMi
- Brass Bell, a long-range reconnaissance vehicle
- Hywards (Hypersonic Weapons Research and Development Supporting system), a smaller prototype system to develop the technologies needed for Robo and Brass Bell

== Development ==
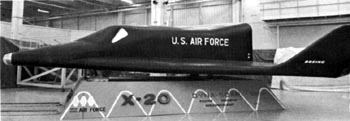
Boeing mock-up of X-20 Dyna-Soar

Days after the launch of Sputnik 1 on 4 October 1957, on either 10 October or 24 October, the USAF Air Research and Development Command (ARDC) consolidated Hywards, Brass Bell, and Robo studies into the Dyna-Soar project, or Weapons System 464L, with a three-step abbreviated development plan. The proposal drew together the existing boost-glide proposals into a single vehicle designed to carry out all the bombing and reconnaissance tasks examined by the earlier studies, and would act as successor to the X-15 research program.

The three stages of the Dyna-Soar program were to be a research vehicle (Dyna-Soar I), a reconnaissance vehicle (Dyna-Soar II, previously Brass Bell), and a vehicle that added strategic bombing capability (Dyna-Soar III, previously Robo). The first glide tests for Dyna-Soar I were expected to be carried out in 1963, followed by powered flights, reaching Mach 18, the following year. A robotic glide missile was to be deployed in 1968, with the fully operational weapons system (Dyna-Soar III) expected by 1974.

In March 1958, nine U.S. aerospace companies tendered for the Dyna-Soar contract. Of these, the field was narrowed to proposals from Bell and Boeing. Even though Bell had the advantage of six years' worth of design studies, the contract for the spaceplane was awarded to Boeing in June 1959 (by which time their original design had changed markedly and now closely resembled what Bell had submitted). In late 1961, the Titan III was chosen as the launch vehicle. The Dyna-Soar was to be launched from Cape Canaveral Air Force Station, Florida.

== Spacecraft description ==
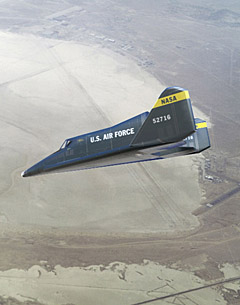
Artist's impression of the X-20 on landing approach at Edwards Air Force Base

The overall design of the X-20 Dyna-Soar was outlined in March 1960. It had a low-wing delta shape, with winglets for control rather than a more conventional tail. The framework of the craft was to be made from the René 41 super alloy, as were the upper surface panels. The bottom surface was to be made from molybdenum sheets placed over insulated René 41, while the nose-cone was to be made from graphite with zirconia rods.

Due to changing requirements, several versions of the Dyna-Soar were considered, all sharing the same basic shape and layout. A single pilot sat at the front, with an equipment bay situated behind. This bay contained data-collection equipment, weapons, reconnaissance equipment, or a four-person mid-deck in the case of the X-20X shuttle space vehicle. A Martin Marietta Transtage upper stage attached to the aft end of the craft would allow orbital maneuvers and a launch abort capability before being jettisoned before descent into the atmosphere. While falling through the atmosphere an opaque heat shield made from a refractory metal would protect the window at the front of the craft. This heat shield would then be jettisoned after aerobraking so the pilot could see, and safely land.

A drawing in the Space/Aeronautics magazine from before the project's cancellation depicts the craft skimming the atmosphere for an orbital inclination change. It would then fire its rocket to resume orbit. This would be a unique ability for a spacecraft, as the laws of celestial mechanics ordinarily mean a change of plane requires an enormous expenditure of energy. The Dyna-Soar was projected to be able to use this capability to rendezvous with satellites even if the target conducted evasive maneuvers.

Unlike the later Space Shuttle, Dyna-Soar did not have wheels on its tricycle undercarriage, as rubber tires would have caught fire during re-entry. Instead Goodyear developed retractable wire-brush skids made of the same René 41 alloy as the airframe.

== Operational history ==
In April 1960, seven astronauts were secretly chosen for the Dyna-Soar program:

- Neil Armstrong (1930–2012; NASA) 1960–1962
- William H. "Bill" Dana (1930–2014; NASA) 1960–1962
- Henry C. Gordon (1925–1996; Air Force) 1960–1963
- Pete Knight (1929–2004; Air Force) 1960–1963
- Russell L. Rogers (1928–1967; Air Force) 1960–1963
- Milt Thompson (1926–1993; NASA) 1960–1963
- James W. Wood (1924–1990; Air Force) 1960–1963

Neil Armstrong and Bill Dana left the program in mid-1962. On 19 September 1962, Albert Crews was added to the Dyna-Soar program and the names of the six remaining Dyna-Soar astronauts were announced to the public.

By the end of 1962, Dyna-Soar had been designated X-20, the booster (to be used in the Dyna-Soar I drop-tests) successfully fired, and the USAF had held an unveiling ceremony for the X-20 in Las Vegas.

The Minneapolis-Honeywell Regulator Company (later the Honeywell Corporation) completed flight tests on an inertial guidance sub-system for the X-20 project at Eglin Air Force Base, Florida, using an NF-101B Voodoo by August 1963.

Boeing B-52C-40-BO Stratofortress 53-0399 was assigned to the program for air-dropping the X-20, similar to the X-15 launch profile. When the X-20 was cancelled, it was used for other air-drop tests including that of the B-1A escape capsule.

=== Problems ===
Besides the funding issues that often accompany research efforts, the Dyna-Soar program suffered from two major problems: uncertainty over the booster to be used to send the craft into orbit, and a lack of a clear goal for the project.

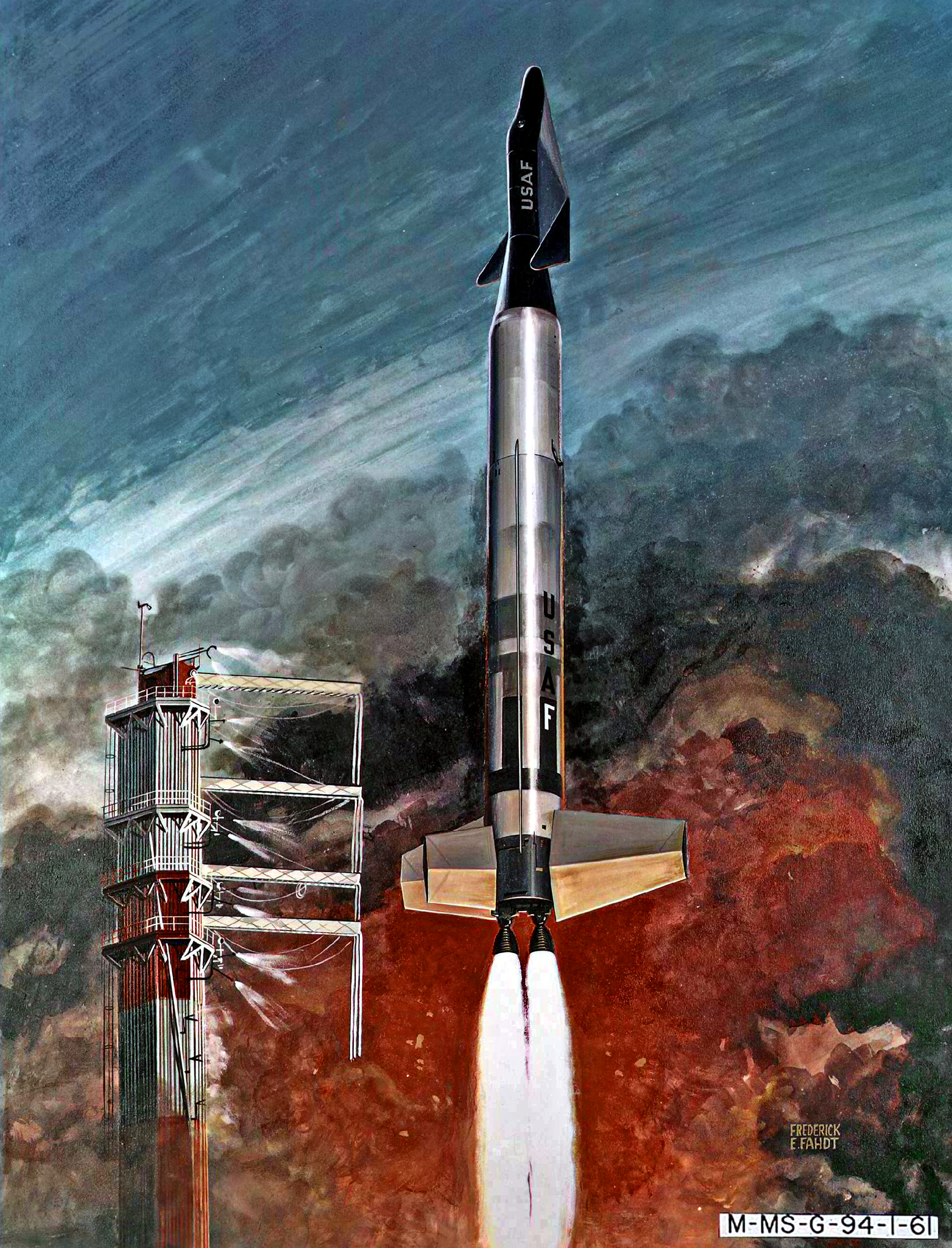
An artist's impression of Dyna-Soar being launched using a Titan booster, with large fins added to the Titan's first stage

Many different boosters were proposed to launch Dyna-Soar into orbit.

The original USAF proposal suggested LOX/JP-4, fluorine-ammonia, fluorine-hydrazine, or RMI (X-15) engines, but Boeing, the principal contractor, favored an Atlas-Centaur combination. Eventually, in November 1959, the Air Force stipulated a Titan, as suggested by failed competitor Martin, but the Titan I was not powerful enough to launch the five-ton X-20 into orbit.

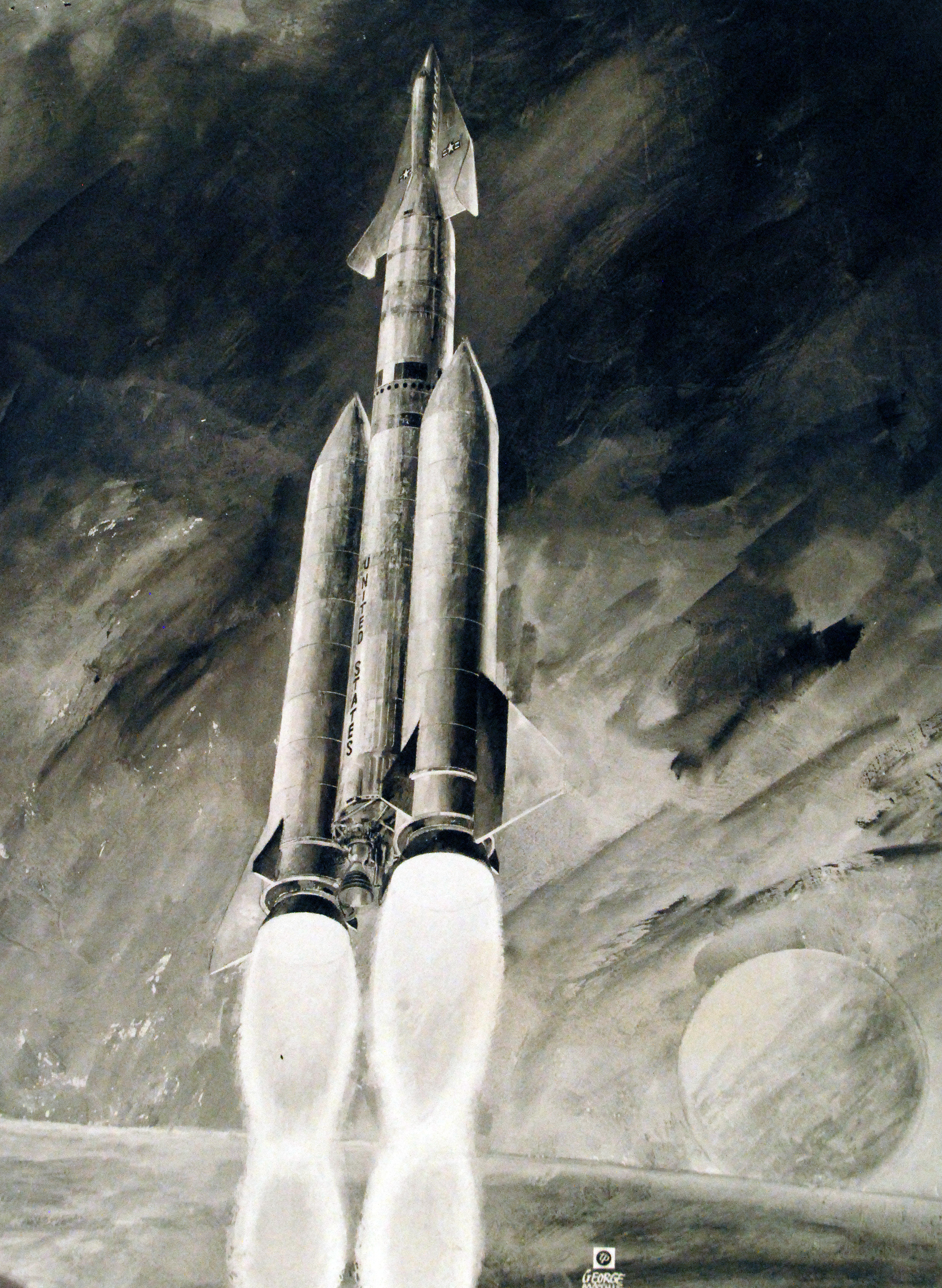
An artist's impression of an Air Force Titan III boosting the X-20 Dyna-Soar into orbit (1962)

The Titan II and Titan III boosters could launch Dyna-Soar into Earth orbit, as could the Saturn C-1 (later renamed the Saturn I), and all were proposed with various upper-stage and booster combinations. In December 1961, the Titan IIIC was chosen,) but the vacillations over the launch system delayed the project and complicated planning.

The original intention for Dyna-Soar, outlined in the Weapons System 464L proposal, called for a project combining aeronautical research with weapons system development. Many questioned whether the USAF should have a crewed space program, when that was the primary domain of NASA. It was frequently emphasized by the Air Force that, unlike the NASA programs, Dyna-Soar allowed for controlled re-entry, and this was where the main effort in the X-20 program was placed.

On 19 January 1963, the Secretary of Defense, Robert McNamara, directed the U.S. Air Force to undertake a study to determine whether Gemini or Dyna-Soar was the more feasible approach to a space-based weapon system. In the middle of March 1963, after receiving the study, Secretary McNamara "stated that the Air Force had been placing too much emphasis on controlled re-entry when it did not have any real objectives for orbital flight". This was seen as a reversal of the Secretary's earlier position on the Dyna-Soar program. Boeing had felt confident enough to display a full scale Mock-up of the X-20 and had started to cut parts and start construction on the X-20. Dyna-Soar was also an expensive program that would not launch a crewed mission until the mid-1960s at the earliest. This high cost and questionable utility made it difficult for the U.S. Air Force to justify the program.

Eventually, the X-20 Dyna-Soar program was canceled on 10 December 1963. On the day that X-20 was canceled, the U.S. Air Force announced another program, the Manned Orbiting Laboratory, a spin-off of Gemini. This program was also eventually canceled.

Another black program, ISINGLASS, which was to be air-launched from a B-52 bomber, was evaluated and some engine work done, but was eventually cancelled as well.

=== Legacy ===
Despite cancellation of the X-20, the affiliated research on spaceplanes influenced the much larger Space Shuttle. The final design also used delta wings for controlled landings. The later, and much smaller Soviet BOR-4 was closer in design philosophy to the Dyna-Soar, while NASA's Martin X-23 PRIME and Martin Marietta X-24A/HL-10 research aircraft also explored aspects of sub-orbital and space flight. The ESA's proposed Hermes crewed spacecraft was superficially similar to but not derived from the X-20.

== Specifications (as designed) ==
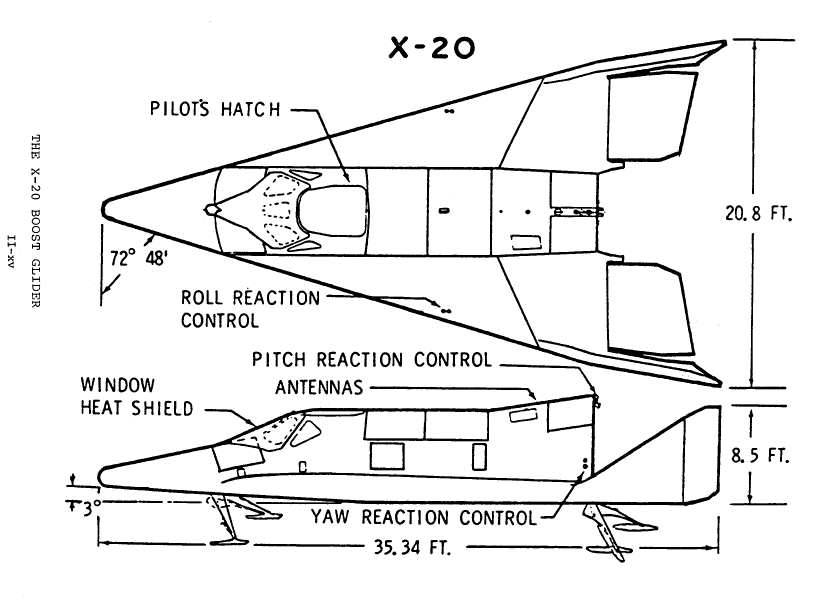
Orthographically projected diagram of the X-20

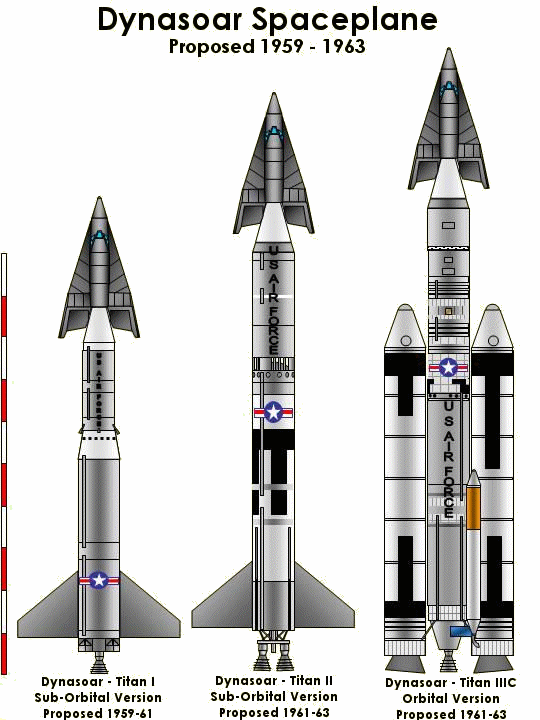
Possible X-20 Dyna-Soar launchers

General characteristics

- Crew: One pilot
- Length: 35.34 ft (10.77 m)
- Wingspan: 20.8 ft (6.3 m)
- Height: 8.5 ft (2.6 m)
- Wing area: 345 sq ft (32.1 m^{2})
- Empty weight: 10,395 lb (4,715 kg)
- Max takeoff weight: 11,387 lb (5,165 kg)
- Powerplant: 2 × AJ10-138 rocket engine, 8,000 lbf (36 kN) thrust each

Performance

- Maximum speed: 17,500 mph (28,200 km/h, 15,200 kn)
- Range: 25,000 mi (41,000 km, 22,000 nmi)
- Service ceiling: 530,000 ft (160,000 m)
- Rate of climb: 100,000 ft/min (510 m/s)
- Wing loading: 33 lb/sq ft (160 kg/m^{2})

== Media ==
- The 1959 Twilight Zone season 1 episode titled "And When the Sky Was Opened" made reference to a spacecraft called the X-20 which had a similar profile but could carry a crew of three.
- In 1962, the fifth book in Donald A. Wollheim's Mike Mars series, Mike Mars flies the Dyna-Soar, had the title character fly an emergency rescue mission in the Dyna-Soar.
- John Berryman's 1963 short story "The Trouble with Telstar" featured a Dyna-Soar being used to intercept communications satellites for repair.
- The 1969 Hollywood film drama Marooned featured a rescue craft modeled somewhat after the Dyna-Soar (called the X-RV for experimental rescue vehicle) being hurriedly deployed to rescue astronauts aboard a crippled Apollo command capsule. This was lampooned in Mad Magazine as the XRT, the experimental rescue thing.

== See also ==
- Boeing X-37 – Reusable robotic spaceplane used by US military since 2010
- Dream Chaser
- Saturn-Shuttle – Concept of launching the Space Shuttle orbiter using the Saturn V rocket
- Hermes
- Hypersoar – US program to develop a hypersonic weapon

Related development

- Manned Orbital Laboratory

Aircraft of comparable role, configuration, and era

- ASSET – a subscale reentry test vehicle designed to verify the superalloy heatshield of the DynaSoar.
- BOR-4
- BOR-5
- Mikoyan-Gurevich MiG-105
- North American X-15
- Silbervogel
