= Saenger (spacecraft) =

German cancelled spaceplane project

Sänger
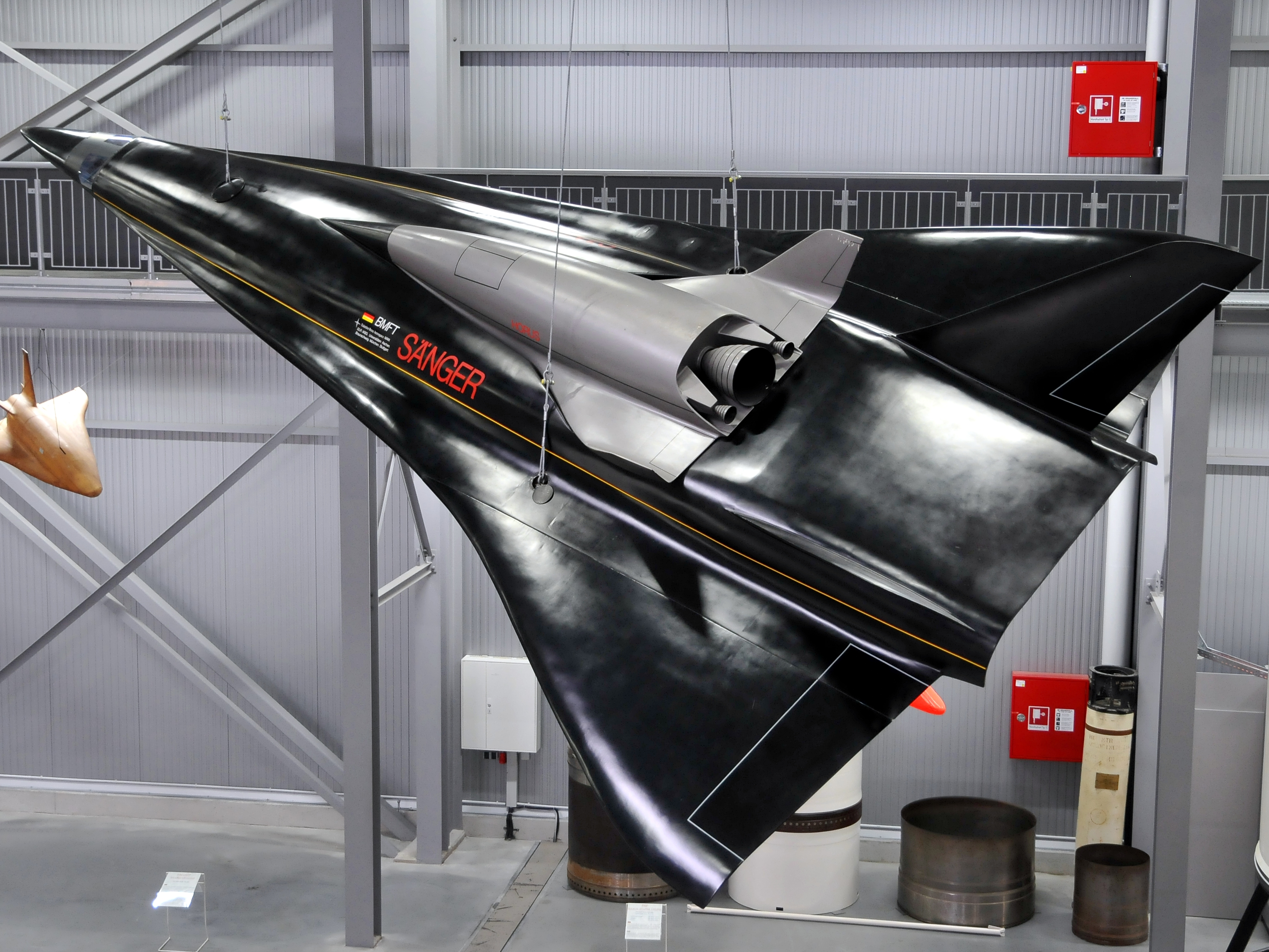
- Model in the Technik Museum Speyer.

General information
- Type: Re-usable spaceplane
- National origin: Germany
- Manufacturer: Junkers
- Designer: Eugen Sänger
- Status: Cancelled in 1994

History
- Manufactured: 0

Saenger or Sänger was a West German concept design for a two-stage-to-orbit spaceplane. It is named after Eugen Sänger, who had been a key figure in the development of the concept for aerospace company Junkers.

Its first incarnation, designated as Saenger I, started development during the 1960s. German aerospace firm Messerschmitt-Bölkow-Blohm (MBB) produced concepts for its use as both a hypersonic passenger airliner and as a two-stage launch vehicle for deploying various payloads, including astronauts via the conceptual Horus (Hypersonic Orbital Upper Stage) spaceplane, into orbit. These ideas drew the support of the German Aerospace Center (DLR), leading to further detailed studies being conducted as a part of a national-level hypersonic study.

During the 1980s, the German government took increasing interest in the project for use as a reusable launch system, resulting in the project gaining official support and work commencing on an enlarged version of the vehicle, known as Saenger II. Work on the project was terminated during 1995 as a consequence of the high projected costs of proceeding and perceived limited performance gains (in comparison to existing expendable launch systems such as the Ariane 5 rocket).

== Development ==
During the early 1940s, German engineer and rocket scientist Eugen Sänger produced the initial designs for a two-stage rocket-aircraft. Proposed in the backdrop of the Second World War, it was proposed that the envisioned aircraft for military purposes; in concept, this vehicle would have been capable of travelling at speeds of up to 17,000 kilometers per hour, traversing the Atlantic ocean and dropping a one-tonne payload of armaments upon targets on the East Coast of the United States, including New York City. While such an aircraft was never constructed at this time, as a concept, it served as a starting point for later work.

During the 1960s and 1970s, Messerschmitt-Bölkow-Blohm (MBB) resumed work on the concept, which became known as Saenger. The study project drew the attention of the German Aerospace Center (DLR), who formally adopted it as a reference concept for a West German hypersonic programme. Saenger was viewed as being a potential passenger airliner, which would have been both larger and faster than the Anglo-French Concorde, as well as for its use for launching payloads into low Earth orbit (LEO). Another key potential use for the type was as a first stage of a two-stage launch platform for an envisioned spacecraft, which was known as Horus (Hypersonic Orbital Upper Stage), as well as an uncrewed cargo module, which was known as Cargus (Cargo Upper Stage). It was also believed that, in theory, Saenger was to have been capable of reducing the costs of launching payloads into orbit from $3,500 per pound to $500 per pound; the projected launch cost was viewed as a major economic argument for proceeding with development.

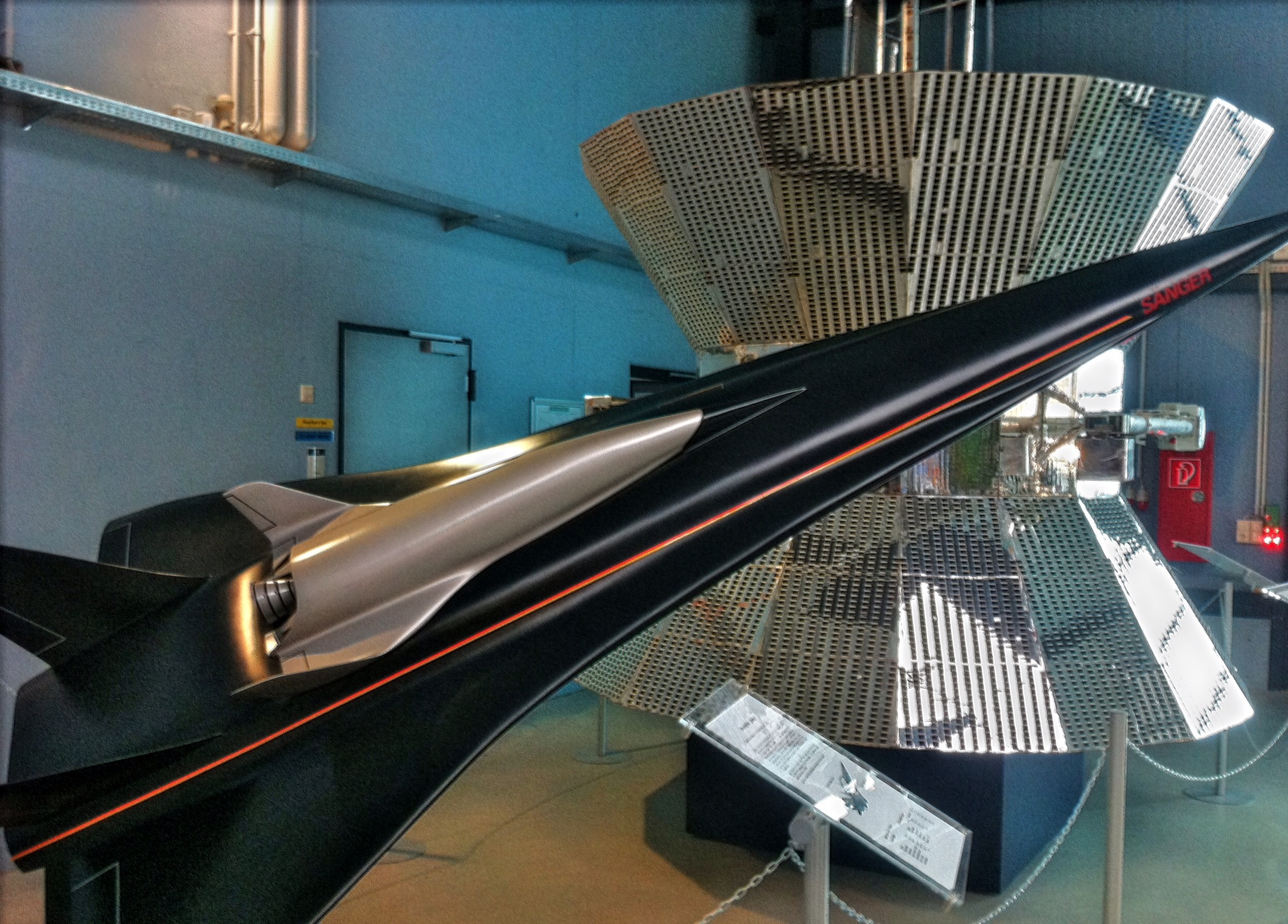
A scale model of Saenger

During the mid-1980s, official interest in the Saenger programme became increasingly prominent. In June 1985, a formal presentation on the Saenger launch system was made to the European Space Agency (ESA) council. At this point, the ESA had three competing projects to consider, aside from Saenger, these being the French Hermes and HOTOL. According to aerospace publication Flight International, from the onset, it was apparent that funding from the ESA would already be difficult to obtain, both due to the agency's lack of available budget and a perceived lack of political support for the programme. While German support for Saenger was present, there was also a widely-felt desire for the ESA to de-emphasise and de-prioritise the development and deployment of independent crewed space programmes, instead focusing upon the utilisation of existing capabilities and other space-related research programmes.

The West German government came to an agreement to finance development work on the Saenger; this was intended to work towards a component demonstration, which was scheduled to be held between 1993 and 1999, and a prototype, which was to be completed by 2000. Throughout the first phase, which had been anticipated to run into 1992, the West German Research Ministry provided $122 million, 7 per cent of its space-related budget, while the DLR contributed $48 million, the German Research Society gave $17 million, and German industry invested another $22 million. During August 1988, the first configuration of the Saenger was established.

By this point, the projected time and cost involved in order to fully complete development work was $12 billion over the course of 20 years. However, attention within the German government was not focused on Saenger alone; a rival Hermes spaceplane, which had been approved by the European Space Agency (ESA), also attracted attention and was viewed as having broader support amongst European partners. In 1995, the project was discontinued primarily due to concerns of development costs and limited gains in price and performance compared to the existing space launch systems such as the Ariane 5 rocket.

== Design ==
The Saenger was a highly aerodynamic hypersonic aircraft, similar in size to a conventional Boeing 747 airliner, and capable of taking off like conventional aircraft. As a conventional aircraft, it was projected to have been capable of cruising speeds of up to Mach 4.4 over a range of 11,000 kilometers while carrying around 230 passengers; this was more than double the speed, range, and capacity of the Anglo-French Concorde, the only operational supersonic passenger airliner to see long term service. The Saenger would have been powered by an arrangement of six hybrid turboramjet engines; According to aerospace publication Flight International, "the key for success is, without doubt, the availability of very advanced jet engines for the mothership".

The Saenger was intended to be developed for various functions. For space launches, it would have been employed as a mother ship for the air-launching of payloads into orbit. As envisioned, it would have carried a smaller piloted orbital spaceplane, known as Horus (Horizontal Upper Stage); Horus would have been principally used to service and supply space stations by transporting various payloads, including between 4,000 lb and 6,000 lb of cargo and up to six astronauts, into a 270-mile orbit. The employment of additional upper stages was anticipated, including the uncrewed expendable Cargus (Cargo Upper Stage) vehicle, which would have been used to convey payloads between 5 and 15 tonnes, into low Earth orbit (LEO). The propulsion of Cargus would have re-used elements of the Ariane 5 rocket. In a space launch configuration, Saenger would have taken off conventionally and ascended up to a ceiling altitude of 100,000 ft and a maximum speed of Mach 6, after which the second stage would have separated and began its independently-powered ascent to orbit.

The use of Saenger as a hypersonic passenger airliner was studied in depth; as it would have flown at very high altitudes, there would have been greatly reduced noise levels at ground level, which had been a high-profile matter of public controversy for the earlier Concorde. The first stage of the Saenger launch system was aerodynamically similar to the proposed hypersonic airliner model, and thus shared a level of a commonality in terms of development work.

== Variants ==
=== Saenger I ===
The Saenger I vehicle utilised a two-stage concept, similar to that of the American Space Shuttle. The first stage with the second stage attached on top would take off horizontally using a runway and climb to an altitude of 30 km using airbreathing ramjet engines. The second stage would then detach and accelerate to orbital speeds and altitudes using its LOX/LH2 rocket engine. The advantage of this approach is that the first stage utilises the advantages of air-breathing engines (such as higher specific impulse) until they are no longer viable due to low air pressure and high velocities. The second stage had dimensions of 31 m × 12 m and would have been capable of carrying a pair of astronauts. Another concept RT-8 "Raumtransporter-8", or "Space Transport 8", was to be powered by a steam rocket, which propelled the first and second stages on a 3-km track to a release velocity of 900 km/h.

=== Saenger II ===
The Saenger II project grew out of Saenger I in the late 1980s; it was planned to be a European launch vehicle, which was intended to emulate the concept and capabilities of the Space Shuttle programme. Development work was undertaken by West German aerospace company Messerschmitt-Bölkow-Blohm (MBB). As envisioned, the vehicle would take off from a runway using ramjet engines and climb to 30 km altitude and reach Mach 7. The second stage would then detach and accelerate to orbital velocities and altitudes using its rocket engine, the first stage would return to the original runway. The spacecraft would have been able to deliver a payload of 10,000 kg or a crew module to low Earth orbit.

Another use of Sanger II would have been as passenger plane EHTV (European Hypersonic Transportation Vehicle) MBB HST-230 with 230 passengers for a range of more than 10,000 km (Frankfurt to Tokyo) at a cruise speed of Mach 4.4 in 24.5 km altitude.

== See also ==
- List of canceled launch vehicle designs
