= Přísečnice =

- Former town
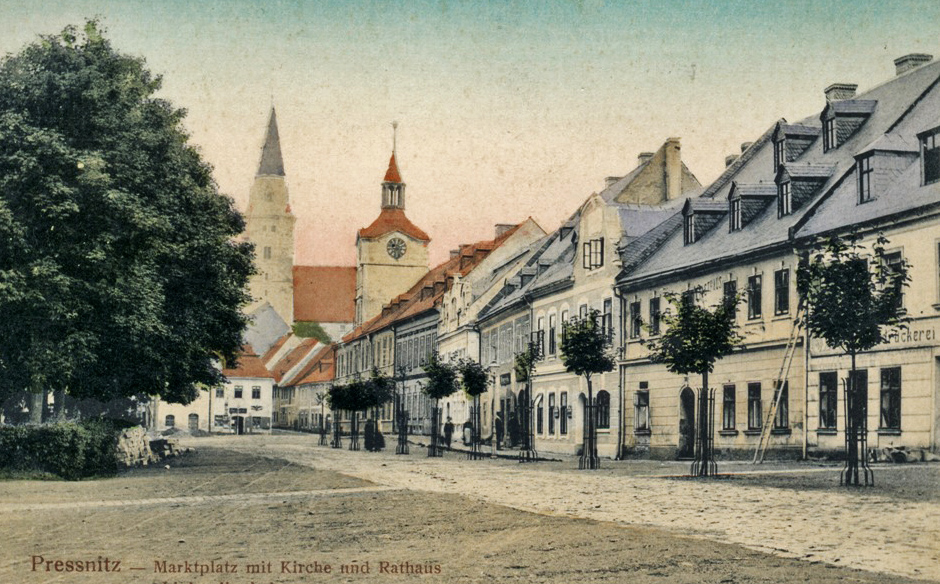
- Old postcard from Přísečnice

- Location in the Czech Republic
- Coordinates: 50°27′55″N 13°7′55″E
- Country: Czech Republic
- Region: Ústí nad Labem
- District: Chomutov

Přísečnice (German: Preßnitz) was a mining town in what is today the municipality of Kryštofovy Hamry in the Ústí nad Labem Region of the Czech Republic. It was located in the Ore Mountains.

== Name ==
The town got its Czech name from the stream of the same name that flowed through it. The German name was created by distortion of the Czech name.

Another possible origin of the town's name is the Czech hydronym breznica.

== History ==
The origins of the town are unclear. The surrounding area had been used by people in prehistory, but the oldest known archaeological evidence of medieval inhabitance in the area was a pyrotechnical object from the turn of the thirteenth century, this was located about 1.5 kilometers southeast of the town.

Přísečnice once sat on an important trade route from Saxony to Bohemia. The road to Bohemia spanned from Saxon Zwickau via Schlettau to Přísečnice, from where two branches continued into the Bohemian interior; the first spanned via Louchov to Kadaň and the second via Výsluní to Kralupy u Chomutova. The first written mention of Přísečnice is from 1335, when John of Bohemia granted the inhabitants an exemption from customs. It was disestablished in 1974 due to the construction of the Přísečnice Reservoir; though the region was already underpopulated due to the expulsion of the German population after World War II.

== Demographics ==
Historical population

Year	Pop.	±%
1869	2,988	—
1880	3,487	+16.7%
1890	3,433	−1.5%
1900	4,080	+18.8%
1910	3,668	−10.1%

Year	Pop.	±%
1921	2,632	−28.2%
1930	2,606	−1.0%
1950	731	−71.9%
1961	660	−9.7%
1970	395	−40.2%

Source: Censuses

== Notable people ==
- Richard Markgraf (1869–1916), palaeontologist
- Eugen Sänger (1905–1964), Austrian aerospace engineer
