= MKR (missile) =

Soviet study for an intercontinental cruise missile

MKR (Межконтинентальная крылатая ракета Intercontinental Cruise Missile) was a Soviet study for an intercontinental cruise missile. A wide range of MKR (intercontinental winged missiles) were studied in 1957–1960 in accordance with a decree of the General Staff. The trade-off studies encompassed long-range air-breathing aircraft, winged rockets, and aircraft launchers for air-breathing missiles. Range was expected to be at least 8000 km.
