= Eugen Sänger =

Austrian aerospace engineer (1905–1964)

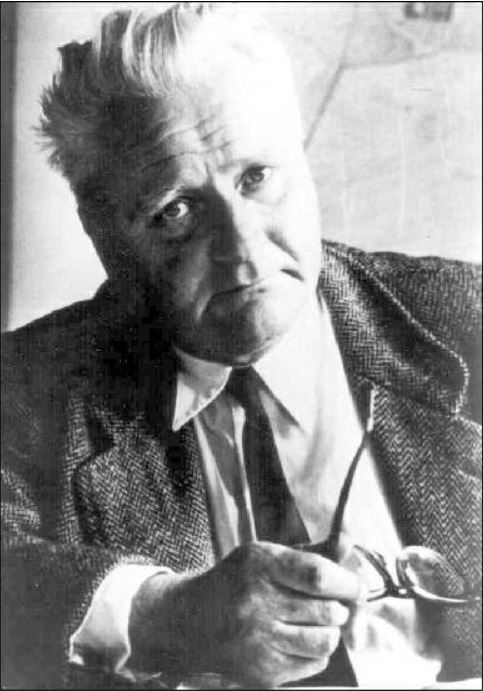
- Born: 22 September 1905; Preßnitz, Bohemia, Austria-Hungary
- Died: 10 February 1964 (aged 58); West-Berlin, Germany
- Education: TU Graz; TU Wien
- Spouse: Irene Sänger-Bredt
- Engineering career
- Significant advance: lifting body and ramjet

Eugen Sänger (22 September 1905 – 10 February 1964) was an Austrian aerospace engineer best known for his contributions to lifting body and ramjet technology.

== Early career ==
Sänger was born in the former mining town of Preßnitz (Přísečnice), near Komotau in Bohemia, part of the Austro-Hungarian Empire at that time . He studied civil engineering at the Technical Universities of Graz and Vienna. As a student, he came in contact with Hermann Oberth's book Die Rakete zu den Planetenräumen ("By Rocket into Planetary Space"), which inspired him to change from studying civil engineering to aeronautics. He also joined Germany's amateur rocket movement, the Verein für Raumschiffahrt (VfR – "Society for Space Travel") which was centered on Oberth.

In 1932 Sänger became a member of the SS and was also a member of the NSDAP.

Sänger made rocket-powered flight the subject of his thesis, but it was rejected by the university as too fanciful.

Sänger was allowed to graduate when he submitted a far more mundane paper on the statics of wing trusses. Sänger would later publish his rejected thesis under the title Raketenflugtechnik ("Rocket Flight Engineering") in 1933. In 1935 and 1936, he published articles on rocket-powered flight for the Austrian journal Flug ("Flight"). These attracted the attention of the Reichsluftfahrtministerium (RLM, or "Reich Aviation Ministry") which saw Sänger's ideas as a potential way to accomplish the goal of building a bomber that could strike the United States from Germany (the Amerikabomber project). The RLM gave him a research institute near Braunschweig and also built a liquid oxygen plant and a test stand for a 100 tonne thrust engine. At the time, Sänger's hiring was opposed by Wernher von Braun, who felt that his own work was being duplicated and may have seen the Austrian and his work as a threat to his own dominance of the field.

== Sub-orbital bomber concept ==
Sänger agreed to lead a rocket development team in the Lüneburger Heide region in 1936. He gradually conceived a rocket-powered sled that would launch a bomber with its own rocket engines that would climb to the fringe of space and then skip along the upper atmosphere – not actually entering orbit, but able to cover vast distances in a series of sub-orbital hops. This remarkable design was called the Silbervogel ("Silverbird") and would have relied on its fuselage creating lift (as a lifting body) to carry it along its sub-orbital path. Sänger was assisted in this design by mathematician Irene Bredt, whom he married in 1951. Sänger also designed the rocket motors that the space-plane would use, which would need to generate 1 meganewton (225,000 lbf) of thrust. In this design, he was one of the first to suggest using the rocket's fuel as a way of cooling the engine, by circulating it around the rocket nozzle before burning it in the engine.

By 1942, the Reich Air Ministry canceled this project along with other more ambitious and theoretical designs in favour of concentrating on proven technologies. Sänger was sent to work for the Deutsche Forschungsanstalt für Segelflug (DFS, or "German Gliding Research Institute"). There he did important work on ramjet technology, working on projects such as the Skoda-Kauba Sk P.14 interceptor, until the end of World War II.

== Postwar ==
After the war ended, Sänger worked for the French government and in 1949 founded the Fédération Astronautique. Whilst in France, he was the subject of a botched attempt by Soviet agents to win him over. Joseph Stalin had become intrigued by reports of the Silbervogel design and sent his son, Vasily, and scientist Grigori Tokaty to convince him to come to the Soviet Union, but they failed to do so. It has also been reported that Stalin instructed the NKVD to kidnap him.

In 1951, he became the first President of the International Astronautical Federation. In the same year he married Dr. Irene Bredt, his first assistant, a German engineer, mathematician and physicist co-credited with the design of a proposed intercontinental spaceplane/bomber.

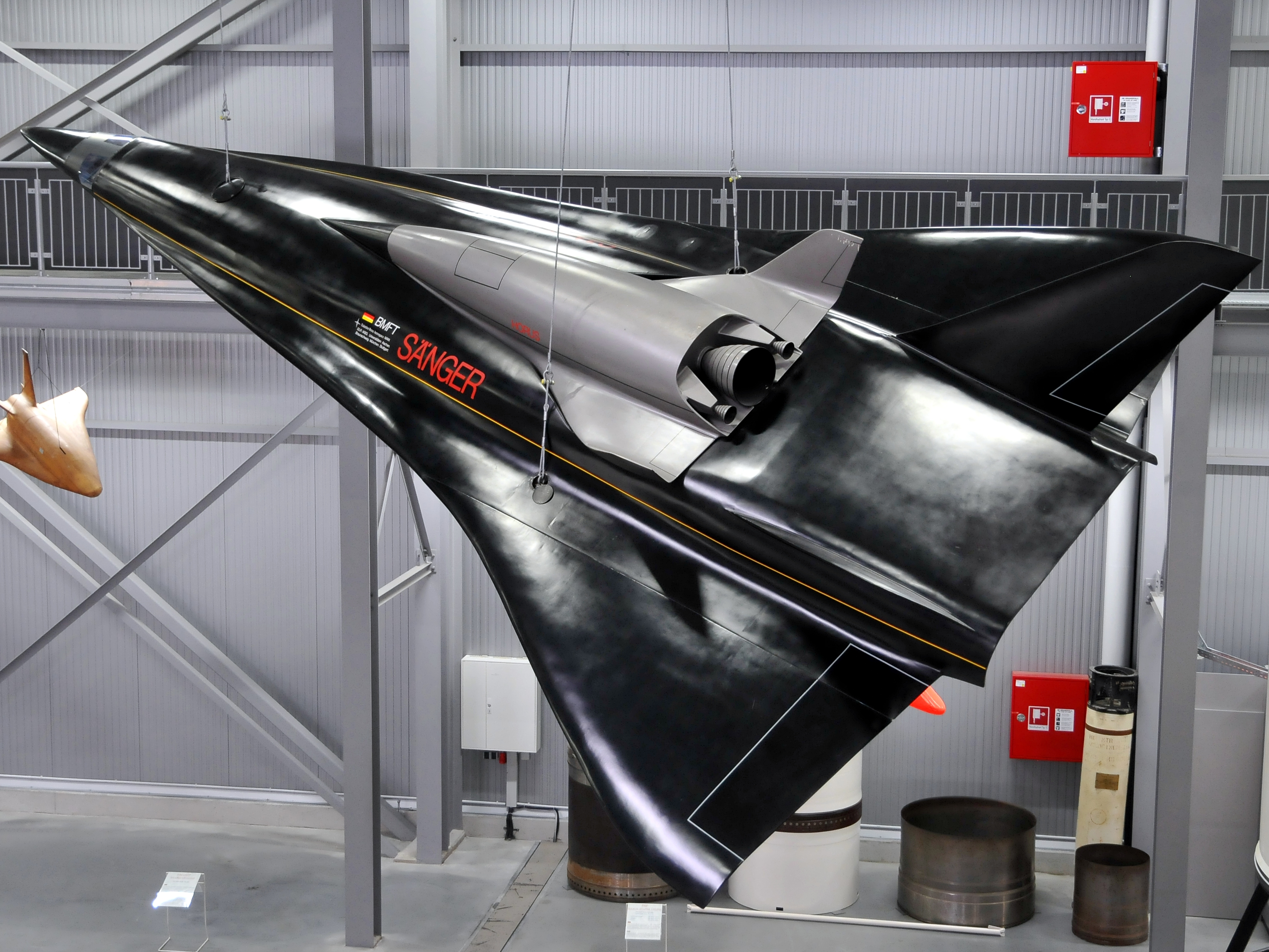
Model of concept Sänger II at Technik Museum Speyer

By 1954, Sänger had returned to Germany and three years later was directing a jet propulsion research institute in Stuttgart. Between 1961 and 1963 he acted as a consultant for Junkers in designing a ramjet-powered space-plane that never left the drawing board. In 1963, he became full professor at Technische Universität Berlin, where he worked until his death. Sänger's other theoretical innovations during this period were proposing means of using photons for interplanetary and interstellar spacecraft propulsion prefiguring the concept of laser propulsion and the solar sail.

In 1960, he assisted the United Arab Republic in developing the Al-Zafir missile.

He died in Berlin, in 1964. Sänger's grave is located in the cemetery "Alter Friedhof" in Stuttgart-Vaihingen. His work on the Silbervogel would prove important to the X-15, X-20 Dyna-Soar, and ultimately Space Shuttle programs. The Saenger spaceplane concept was named after him.

== Honours ==
Honorary member of numerous societies for Space Research in Germany, Great Britain, Austria, the United States of America, Norway, Sweden, Switzerland, Argentina, Italy.

- Elected Honorary Fellow of the British Interplanetary Society (B.I.S.) in 1949
- Hermann Oberth Medal for services to aerospace research
- Austrian Cross of Honour for Science and Art, 1st class
- Commander of the Ordre du Merite pour la Recherche et l'Invention, Paris
- Gagarin Gold Medal Associazione Internazionale Uomo nello Spazio, Rome
- Gold Medal at the Milan Fair
- Sängergasse named after him in Vienna Simmering (11th District) (1971)

== See also ==
- Keldysh bomber
- Laser propulsion
- Silbervogel
- Spacecraft propulsion

== References and further reading ==
=== Books and technical reports ===
- Sänger, Eugen (1956). Zur Mechanik der Photonen-Strahlantriebe. München: R. Oldenbourg. p. 92.
- Sänger, Eugen (1957). Zur Strahlungsphysik der Photonen-Strahlantriebe und Waffenstrahlen. München: R. Oldenbourg. p. 173.
- Sänger, Eugen (1933). Rocket Flight Engineering. Washington, 1965: NASA Tech. Trans. F-223.
- Sänger, Eugen; Irene Sänger-Bredt (August 1944). "A Rocket Drive For Long Range Bombers" (PDF). Astronautix.com. Archived from the original (PDF) on June 14, 2006.
- Saenger, Hartmut E and Szames, Alexandre D, From the Silverbird to Interstellar Voyages, IAC-03-IAA.2.4.a.07.
- Sänger, Eugen; trans, Karl Frucht (1965). Space Flight: Countdown for the Future. New York: McGraw-Hill.
- Dressel, Joachim & Griehl, Manfred (January 1990). "Un bombardier spatial... en 1940" [A Space Bomber... in 1940]. Le Fana de l'Aviation (in French) (242): 35–38. ISSN 0757-4169.
- Duffy, James P. (2004). TARGET: AMERICA : Hitler's Plan to Attack the United States. Praeger. ISBN 0-275-96684-4.
- Shayler, David J. (2005). Women in Space – Following Valentina. Springer. ISBN 1-85233-744-3.

=== Other ===
- Westman, Juhani (2006). "Global Bounce". Archived from the original on 2007-10-09.
- Wade, Mark. "Eugen Albert Saenger". Astronautix.com. Archived from the original on 2007-10-13.
