= Jöhstadt =

- Town
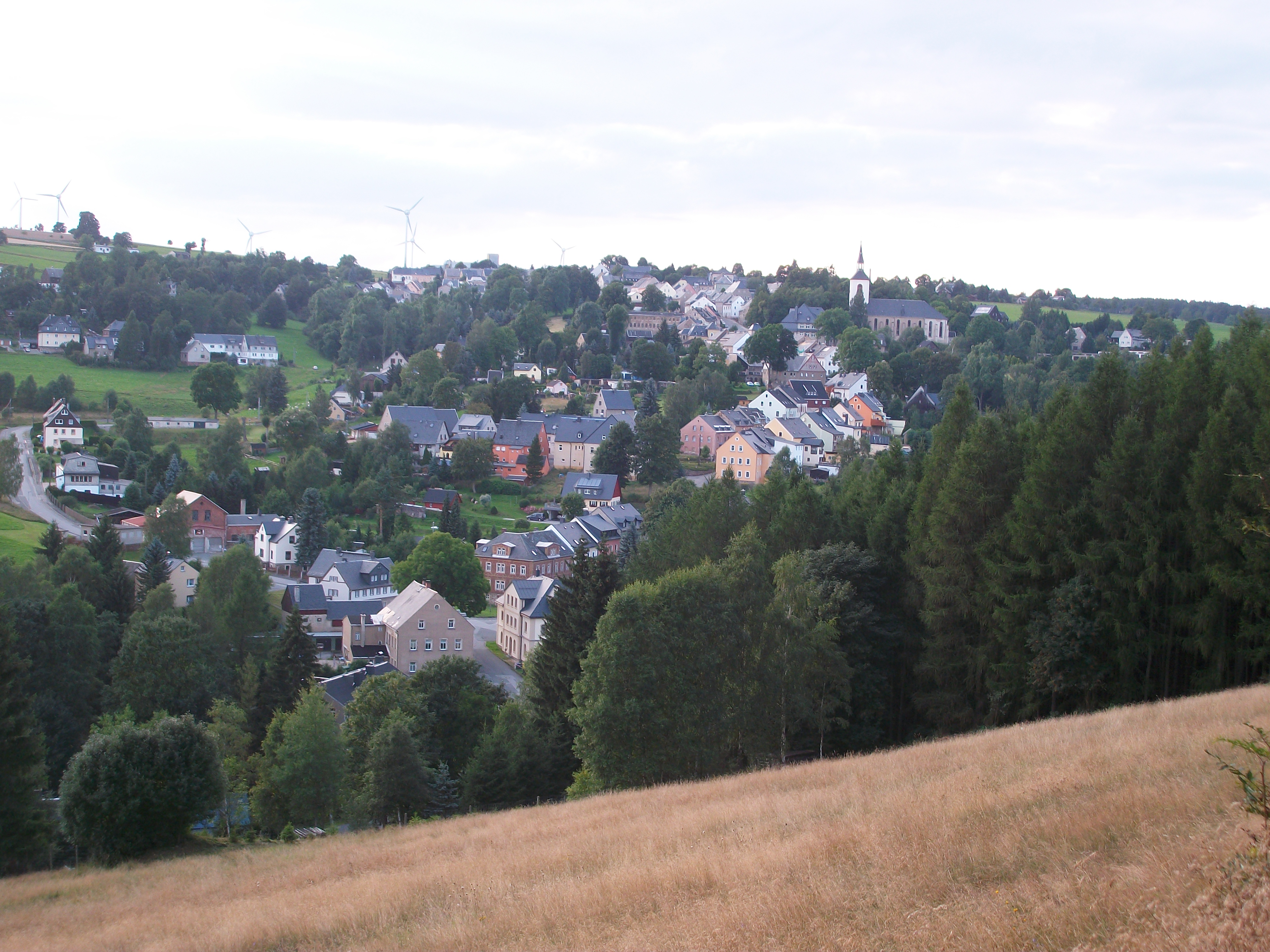
- Jöhstadt

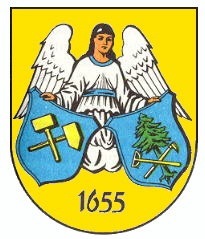
- Coat of arms

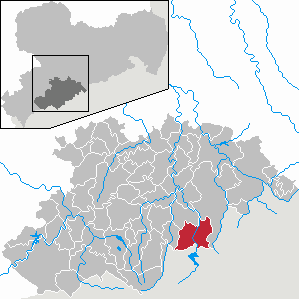
- Location of Jöhstadt within Erzgebirgskreis district
- Interactive map of Jöhstadt
- Location within Germany Location within Saxony
- Coordinates: 50°30′52″N 13°5′19″E
- Country: Germany
- State: Saxony
- District: Erzgebirgskreis

Government
  - Mayor (2020–27): André Zinn (CDU)

Area
  - Total: 49.7 km^{2} (19.2 sq mi)
- Elevation: 520–821 m (1,706–2,694 ft)

Population (2025-12-31)
  - Total: 2,376
  - Density: 47.8/km^{2} (124/sq mi)
- Time zone: UTC+01:00 (CET)
  - Summer (DST): UTC+02:00 (CEST)
- Postal codes: 09477
- Dialling codes: 037343
- Vehicle registration: ERZ, ANA, ASZ, AU, MAB, MEK, STL, SZB, ZP
- Website: www.joehstadt.de

Jöhstadt (German pronunciation: [ˈjøːˌʃtat]) is a town in the district of Erzgebirgskreis, in Saxony, Germany. It is situated in the Ore Mountains, on the border with the Czech Republic, 10 km southeast of Annaberg-Buchholz, and 35 km northeast of Karlovy Vary.

== History ==
From 1952 to 1990, Jöhstadt was part of the Bezirk Karl-Marx-Stadt of East Germany.
