= Irene Sänger-Bredt =

German engineer, mathematician and physicist (1911–1983)

- Born: 24 April 1911; Bonn, Rhine Province, German Empire
- Died: 20 October 1983 (aged 72); Stuttgart, West Germany
- Spouse: Eugen Sänger
- Awards: Hermann Oberth Gold Medal (1970)
- Scientific career
- Fields: Applied mathematics, engineering
- Thesis: X-rays from Rare Earths (1936)

Irene Reinhild Agnes Elisabeth Sänger-Bredt (24 April 1911 – 20 October 1983) was a German aerospace engineer, mathematician, and physicist. She is co-credited with the Silbervoger proposal, a suborbital strategic bomber considered for the Nazi German Amerikabomber project during World War II. She worked as assistant to Eugen Sänger, later marrying him in 1951.

Following the Silbervogel's cancellation, she worked on ramjet test flights at the German Research Institute for Gliding Flight. From 1945 to 1954 Sänger-Bredt worked as a researcher for France's Arsenal de l'Aéronautique. From 1963, she acted as a consultant engineer on space matters for the companies Junkers and Bölkow. In 1960, she became the only woman founding member of the International Academy of Astronautics.

== Life and career ==
Irene Bredt received her doctorate in natural science in 1936. Her thesis was entitled X-rays from Rare Earths. For her first job she was attracted by a tender with few details of the little-known Research Center for Aviation at Trauen, Germany. Bredt began her research work as an assistant of Eugen Sänger at this rocket research centre. Her field of activities became thermodynamic and gas kinetics problems related to liquid-propelled rockets. She became the head of the Physics Department there in 1941 and the following year became a First Assistant at the German Research Institute for Gliding Flight at Ainring. Her task was the maintenance and analysis of ramjet test flights.

In 1945, Bredt moved to Paris and worked there as a researcher in the same area as before but now for the Arsenal de l'Aéronautique, later known as SNECMA. At the same time she acted as consultant to MATRA in Paris Billancourt as well as the Institute of Technology in Madras, South India. In 1954, after her marriage to Eugen Sänger and the birth of their son, Sänger-Bredt returned to Germany. She became deputy scientific director of the Research Institute for the Physics of Jet Propulsion, which had been founded by Sänger in Stuttgart.

In 1960, Sänger-Bredt became one of the founder members — the only woman — of the International Academy of Astronautics. From 1963, she acted as a consultant engineer on space matters for the companies Junkers and Bölkow (later Messerschmitt-Bölkow-Blohm GmbH). Irene Sänger-Bredt died in 1983 in Stuttgart, Germany, by which time she had published 88 papers on topics relating to natural science and the science of culture.

== Honors ==
In 1970 Bredt was honored by the German Rocket Society with the Hermann Oberth Gold Medal, for her impressive scientific accomplishments.
