= Laboratoire Aerodynamique Eiffel =

French research laboratory

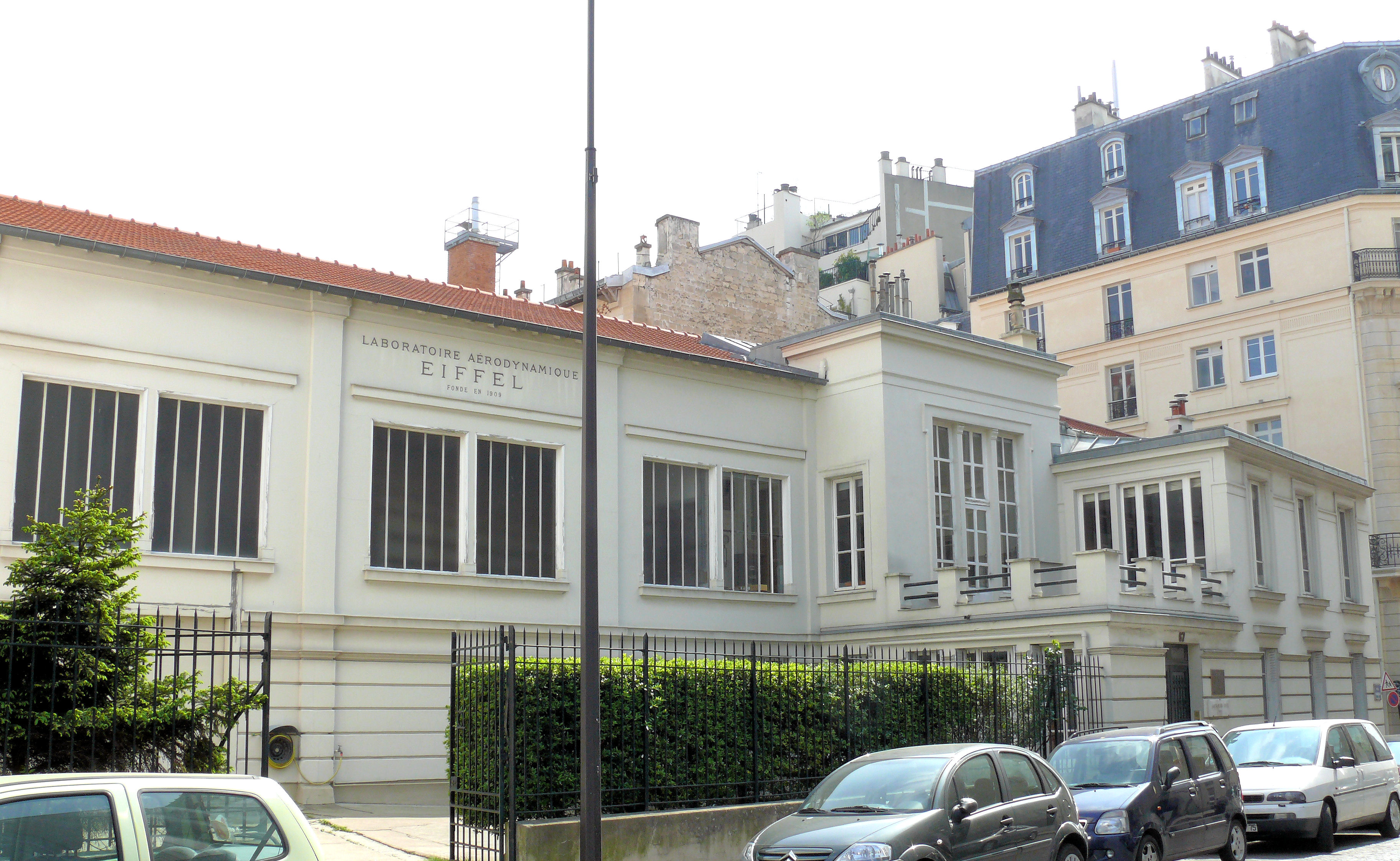
- Established: 1912
- Mission: Fundamental research
- Location: Paris, France
- Coordinates: 48.8422966003418°N 2.263073444366455°E
- Interactive map of Laboratoire Aerodynamique Eiffel
- Website: aerodynamiqueeiffel.fr
- Position in France

The Laboratoire Aerodynamique Eiffel (English: Laboratory of Aerodynamics Eiffel) is a research institute, associated with the Scientific and Technical Centre for Building. It is located in Paris, France, 16th arrondissement.

== History ==
La Société Aérodynamique Eiffel operates the Auteuil wind tunnel, designed in 1912 by Gustave Eiffel and listed as a Monument historique.

Although he was concerned about the wind resistance of structures, Gustave Eiffel did not do a great deal of work on this issue. He carried out very few wind tunnel tests on this specific subject and only studied one of his constructions, the Garabit viaduct. His main contribution to aerodynamics concerns aviation.

Gustave Eiffel is recognised as one of the precursors of experimental aerodynamics, particularly for aeronautics.

As early as 1915, Gustave Eiffel put his facilities and knowledge at the service of the Peugeot Company to improve the performance of a racing car.

This activity remained marginal until 1950, but then developed very rapidly at the request of the car industry. The laboratory designed and manufactured an aerodynamic balance for measuring the main aerodynamic coefficients.

From 1945, the Eiffel Laboratory's facilities were used to determine the wind dimensions of engineering structures.

In 2016, the Eiffel laboratory assisted ADEME (Agence de l'environnement et de la maîtrise de l'énergie) and the public authorities in drafting rules for natural ventilation in housing in the French overseas departments.

== Research partners ==
The following are research partners of the laboratory:

- Institut polytechnique des sciences avancées
- École nationale supérieure d'architecture de Paris-Malaquais
- École d'Architecture de La Réunion
- University of Florence
- IUT de Cachan
