= Stephen Sauvestre =

French architect

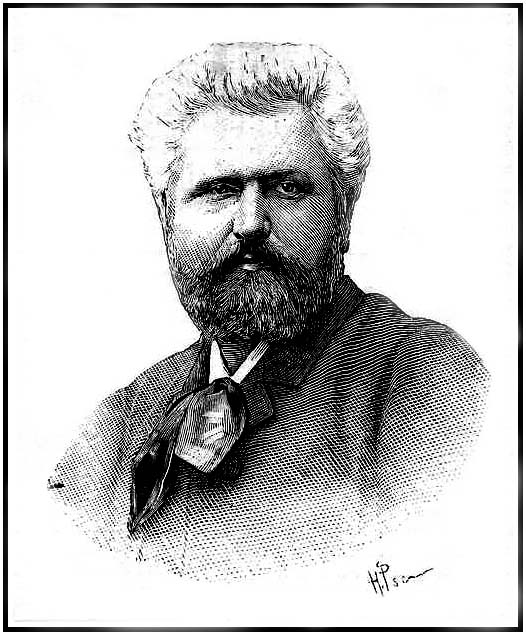
- Stephen Sauvestre, c. 1889
- Born: Charles Léon Stephen Sauvestre; 26 December 1847; Bonnétable, France
- Died: 18 June 1919 (aged 71); Paris, France
- Education: École Spéciale d'Architecture
- Occupation: Architect
- Buildings: Eiffel Tower

Charles Léon Stephen Sauvestre (26 December 1847 – 18 June 1919) was a French architect. He is notable for being one of the architects contributing to the design of the Eiffel Tower, built for the 1889 Universal Exposition in Paris, France.

== Early life ==
Sauvestre was born in Bonnétable, Sarthe in France in 1847. His father Charles Sauvestre was a writer, socialist, activist and teacher and his mother was a housewife. He graduated with first class honors from École Spéciale d'Architecture in 1868. He died in 1919 at the age of 72.

== Career ==
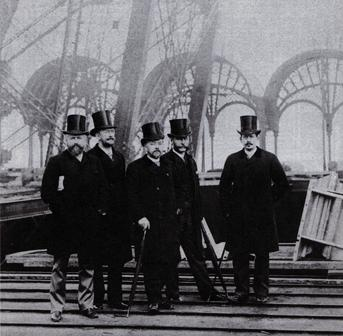
The project team of the Eiffel Tower. Stephen Sauvestre is left, center Gustave Eiffel.

Sauvestre contributed to the design of the Eiffel Tower, adding the decorative arches to the base, a glass pavilion to the first level and the cupola at the top. He also chose the color of the tower. He received the support of Gustave Eiffel who bought the rights to the patent on the design which he had filed together with Maurice Koechlin and Émile Nouguier. He was also the head of the Architecture department Compagnie des Etablissements Eiffel

== Notable projects ==
- 1878: Gas Pavilion, Expo, Paris
- 1879: National School of Chemistry Mulhouse, Kennedy Avenue, Mulhouse
- 1876: Hotel Seyrig in Paris
- 1881: House 61 Rue Ampere
- 1884: Maison d'Albert Menier
- 1884: Hotel Beranger
- 1887 - 1889: Eiffel Tower
- 1889: Galerie des Machines
- 1900 - 1902: Chateaux
- 1905 - 1908: Ancienne usine Menier
- 1906: Menier Chocolate Factory
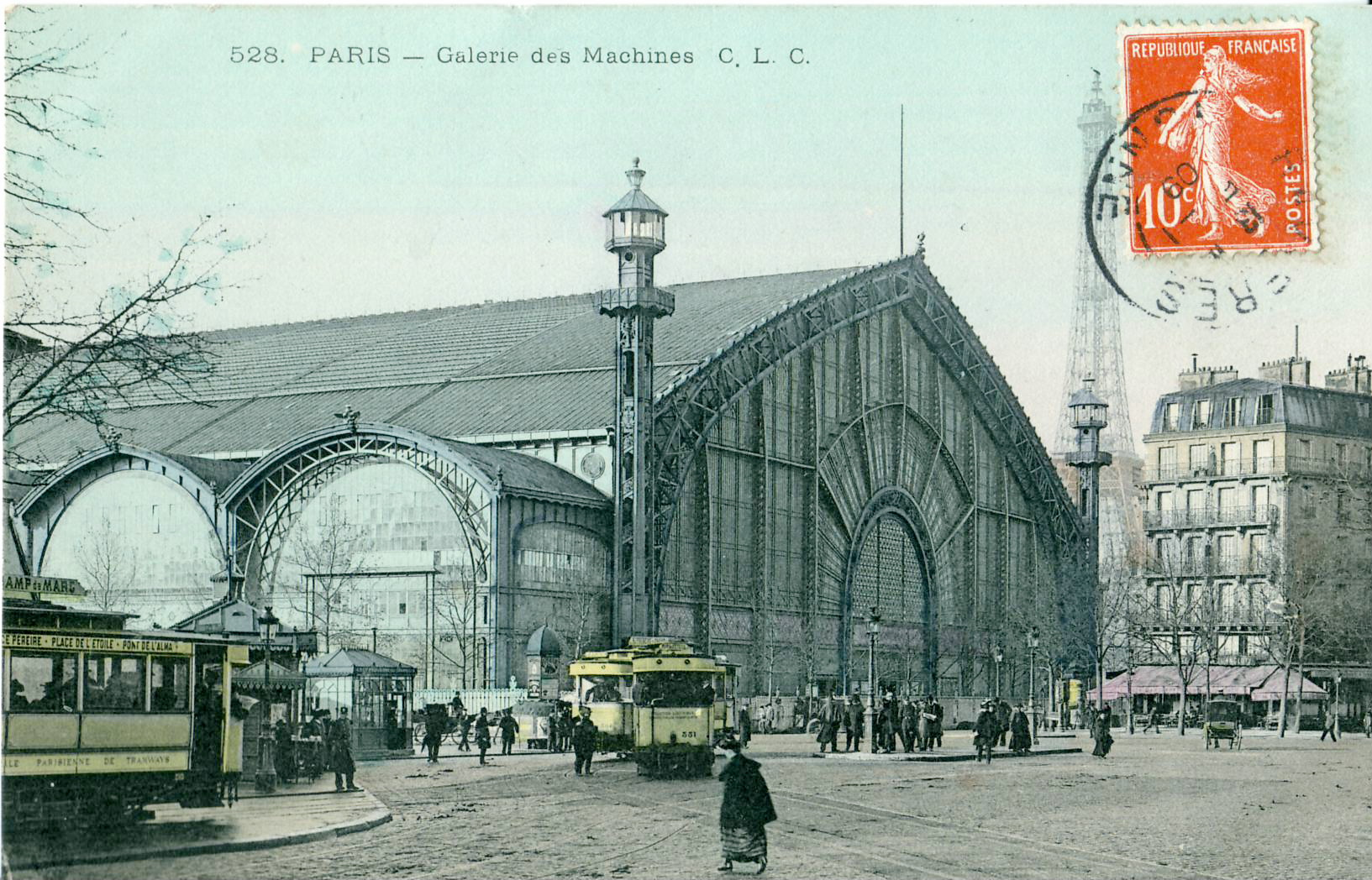
Galerie des Machines

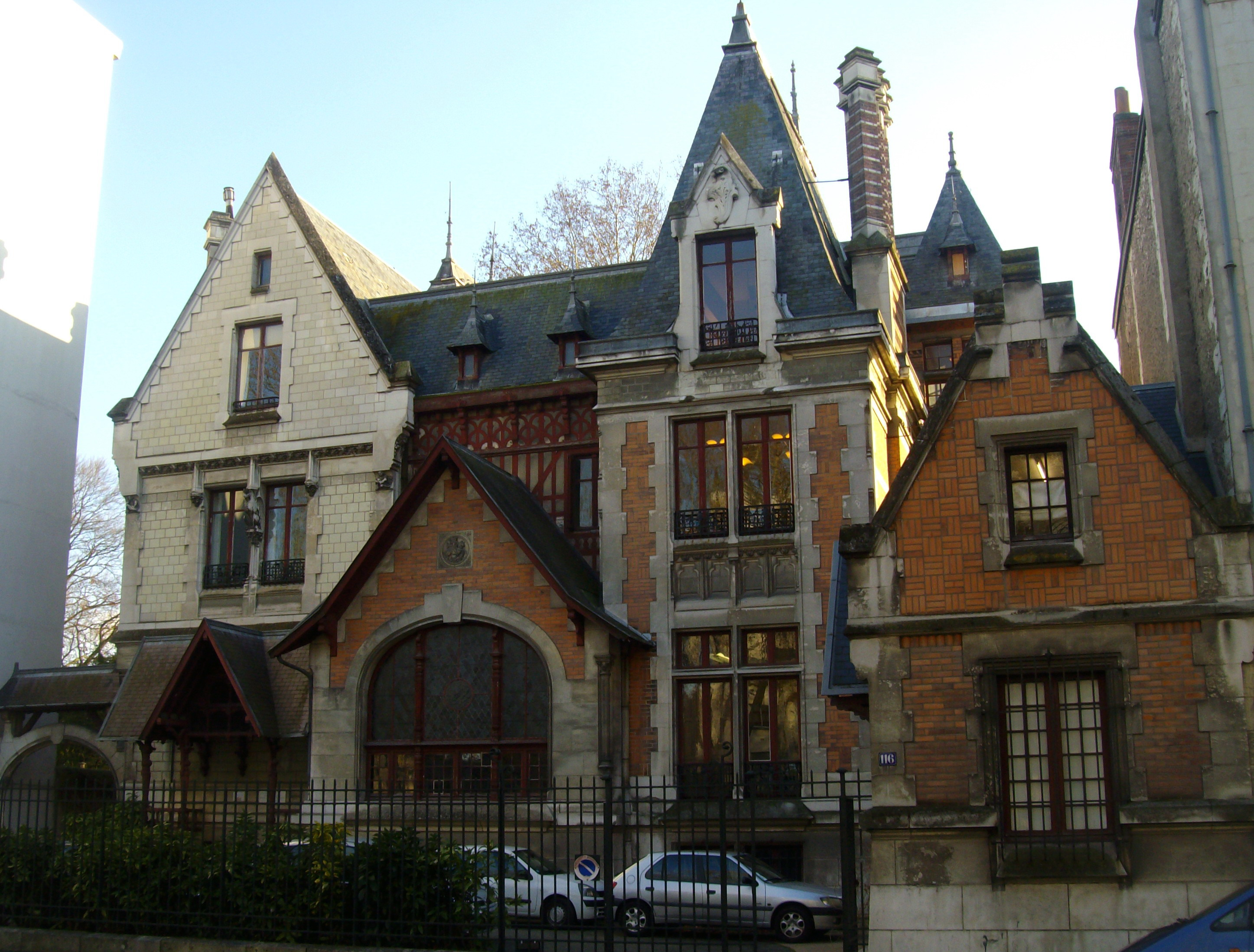
Hotel Beranger

== See also ==
- Exposition Universelle (1889)
- Eiffel Tower
- Maurice Koechlin
- Émile Nouguier
- Alexandre Gustave Eiffel
