= Émile Nouguier =

French civil engineer, architect and a co-designer of the Eiffel Tower

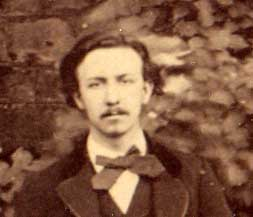
- Born: 17 February 1840; Paris, France
- Died: 23 November 1897 (aged 57); Argenteuil
- Occupation: Architect
- Buildings: Eiffel Tower, Garabit viaduct and Faidherbe Bridge

Émile Nouguier (French pronunciation: [emil nuɡje]; 17 February 1840 – 23 November 1897) was a French civil engineer and architect. He is famous for co-designing the Eiffel Tower, built 1887–1889 for the 1889 Universal Exposition in Paris, France, the Garabit viaduct, the highest in the world at the time, near Ruynes-en-Margeride, Cantal, France, and the Faidherbe Bridge over the Sénégal River in Senegal.

In 1861 he attended and graduated the École Polytechnique in Paris, in 1862 he joined the École nationale supérieure des mines de Paris from which he graduated in 1865 with the title of mining construction engineer.

== Early career ==
After graduating, Émile Nouguier started to work for Ernest Goüin et Cie. and was involved in the construction of:

- Expo Palace in Paris, 1867;
- Road bridge on Rue Brémontier in Paris;
- Rybinsk Bridge over the Volga in Russia;
- Margaret Bridge over the Danube in Budapest, Hungary.

== Career with Gustave Eiffel ==
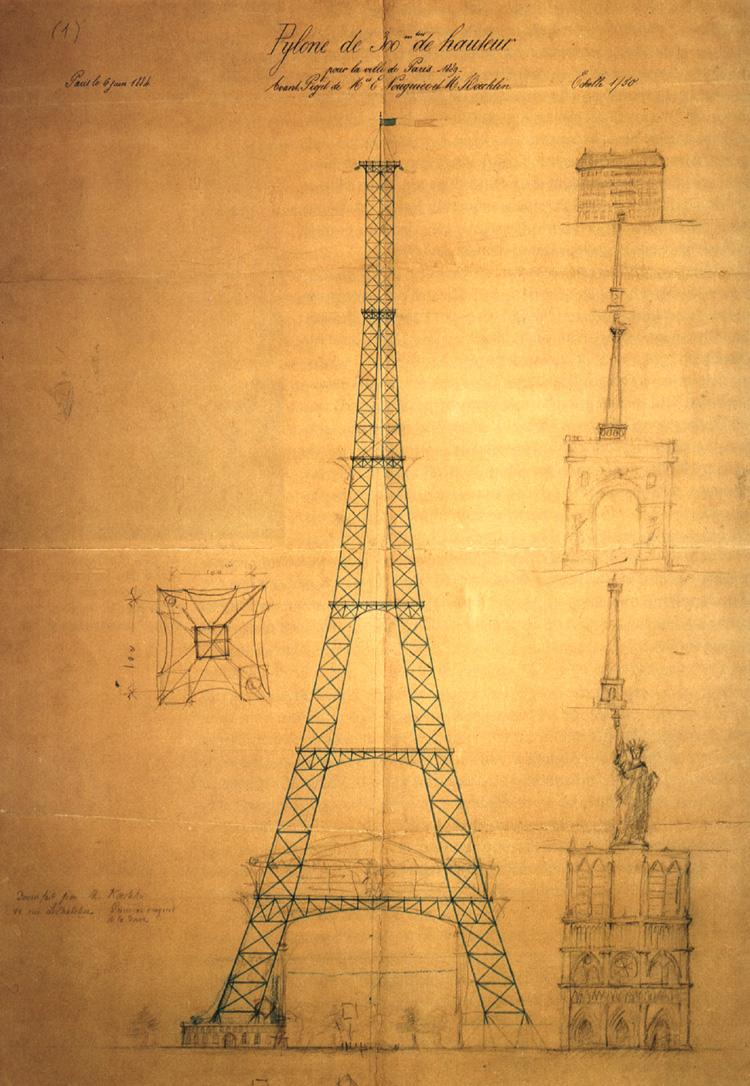
The first sketch of the 300 m metallic pylon made by Émile Nouguier and Maurice Koechlin on 6 June 1884

In 1867 Émile Nouguier was employed by Eiffel et Cie, later the Compagnie des Establissments Eiffel owned by Gustave Eiffel and between 1867 and 1893 he contributed to many construction projects:

- Empalot Bridge, Valentine Bridge and Sarrieu Bridge over the Garonne;
- Cubzac-les-Ponts Bridge over the Dordogne;
- Tardes viaduct over the Tardes;
- Garabit viaduct;
- Port-Mort Dam over the Seine;
- Eiffel Tower in Paris;
- Maria Pia Bridge in Porto, Portugal;
- Vianna Bridge over the Lima River in Portugal;
- Railroad bridges in Portuguese provinces Minho, Douro Litoral and Beira Alta;
- Railroad bridge over the Tagus in Spain;
- Railroad bridges in the Spanish provinces Asturias, León and Galicia;
- Railroad bridges on the Ploiești – Predeal railway in Romania;
- Bridge over the Tisza near Szeged, Hungary.

== Contribution to the Eiffel Tower ==
In 1884 Nouguier and the structural engineer Maurice Koechlin, who also worked for Eiffel, came up with the idea of a large tower to act as the centerpiece of the Universal Exposition which was to be held in 1889. The two engineers consulted Stephen Sauvestre, head of the architectural division of the Eiffel company, who added embellishments including the decorative arches of the base and the glazed pavilion on the first level. The proposal was put before Eiffel, who approved the project, and presented it to the French Minister for Trade and Industry.

In 1884 Gustave Eiffel, Émile Nouguier and Maurice Koechlin registered a patent for the construction of pylons with heights of over 300 m. Later Gustave Eiffel bought the rights from the other two for one percent of the total earnings of the tower if it will be built. They received around 50,000 francs.

== Last years of activity ==
In 1893 Nouguier resigned from the Gustave Eiffel Entreprise and became co-president of Nouguier, Kessler et Cie in Argenteuil, Île-de-France. He continued to work on many important projects, including:

- Tourville Bridge and Oissel Bridge over the Seine on the Paris – Rouen railway
- The compressed air foundations for the bridges at Maisons-Laffitte for the Paris – Rouen railway
- Faidherbe Bridge over the Sénégal River in Senegal
- The bridge at Disuq over the Nile in Egypt
- Road bridges in La Chapelle Boulevard and Rue de Jessaint in Paris
- Saint-Bernard Bridge in Paris.

He died, at the age of 57, on 23 November 1897, three months before the Saint-Bernard Bridge in Paris was officially opened.

== In popular culture ==
Émile Nouguier is a main character in the 2016 novel To Capture What We Cannot Keep by British author Beatrice Colin.
