= Belvárosi Bridge (Szeged) =

Belvárosi Bridge Belvárosi híd
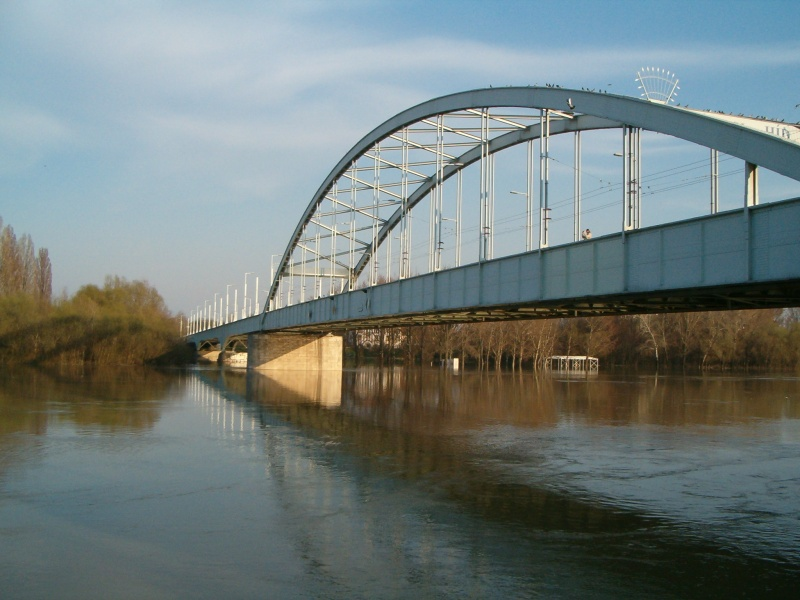
- Coordinates: 46°15′03″N 20°09′11″E
- Crosses: Tisza
- Locale: Szeged, Hungary
- Other name(s): Régi híd (Old Bridge)

Characteristics
- Design: Langer tied-arch bridge
- Total length: 678,2
- Piers in water: 2
- No. of lanes: two lanes road and pedestrian

History
- Architect: Gustave Eiffel and Feketeházy János
- Construction start: 1880
- Construction end: 1883
- Rebuilt: 1948

The Belvárosi Bridge in Szeged, Hungary, is the main bridge of the city, connecting Újszeged, on the left bank of the river Tisza, to the other quarters. It was the only crossing on the river in the County until the finishing of the Bertalan Bridge in 1979. Every year in May the Hídivásár (Bridgemarket) is held there, drawing thousands of visitors to the city.

Its two ends are:

- Roosevelt Square in Szeged, with the Móra Ferenc Múzeum
- Torontál Square in Újszeged, with the Erzsébet Park

== History ==
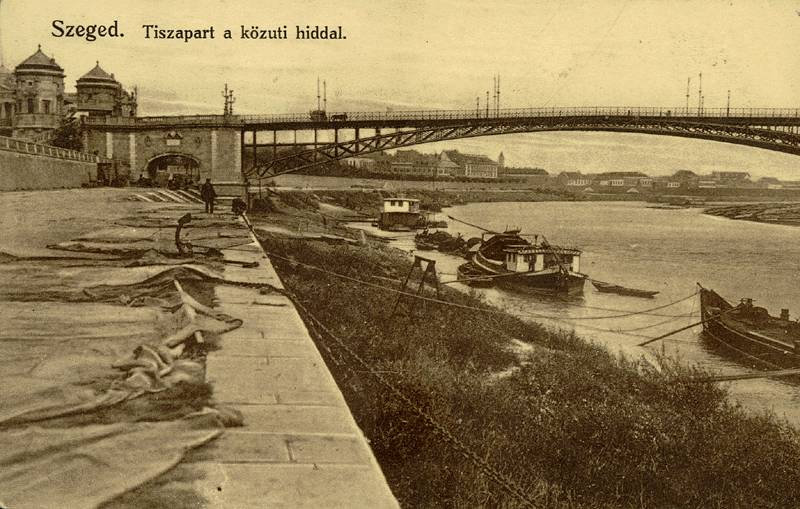
The old bridge opened in 1883.

After the Great Flood of Szeged in 1879, it was an important aspect of the renovations to create a permanent crossing on the Tisza river. Construction began in December 1880, according to the plans of Gustave Eiffel and János Feketeházy, and finished on September 23, 1883.

During the World War II it was seriously damaged on September 3, 1944, in an air attack by the Allies, then at October 9 the same year, German soldiers exploded it while withdrawing before Soviet troops.

The removal of the wreckage started only after the war in 1946, and the reconstruction took two years by the plans of Győző Mihailich and Róbert Folly. The renovated bridge finally reopened in 1948.

Between 1909–1944 and 1949–1979 the Tram line 5 ran through the bridge, since then Trolleybus lines 5 and 7 superseded it.

== Gallery ==
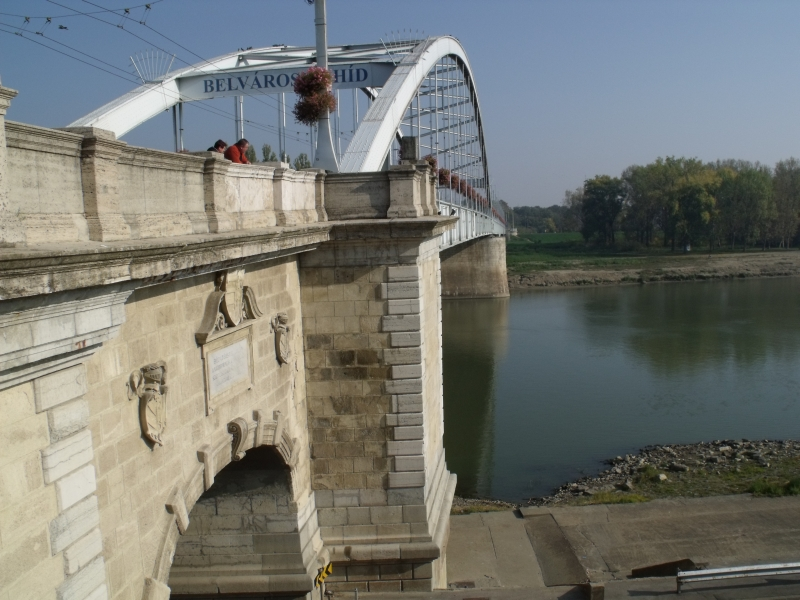
The bridge pictured from the staircase on the right bank

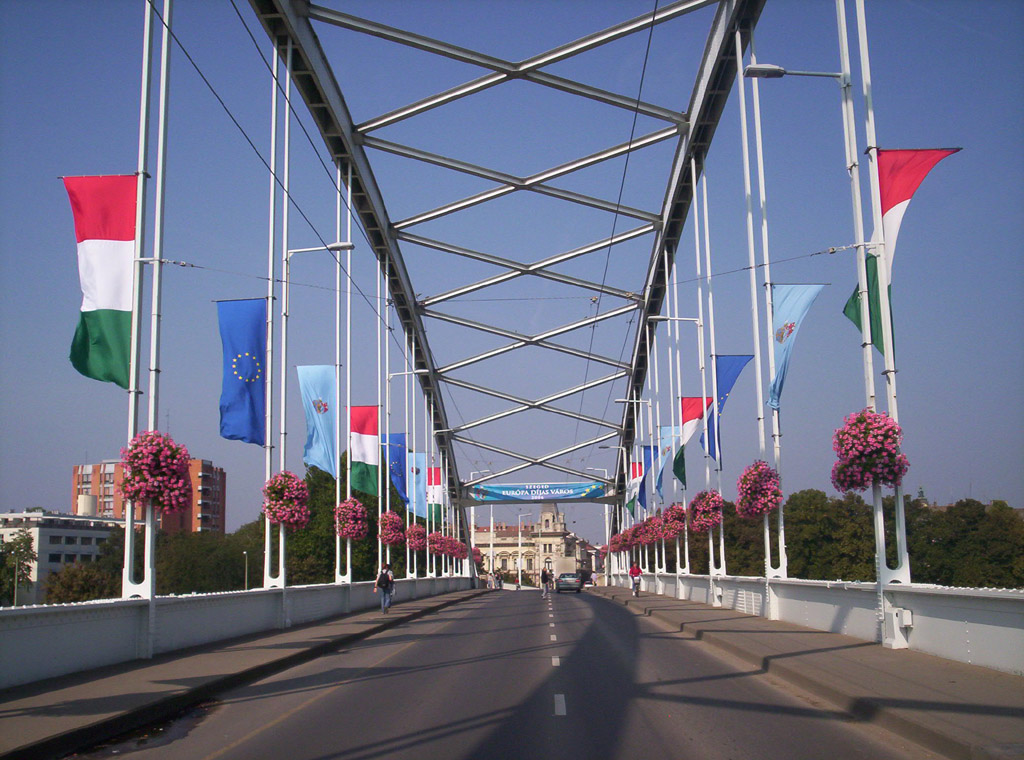
The flags of the city of Szeged, the Republic of Hungary, and the European Union decorate the bridge during national holidays

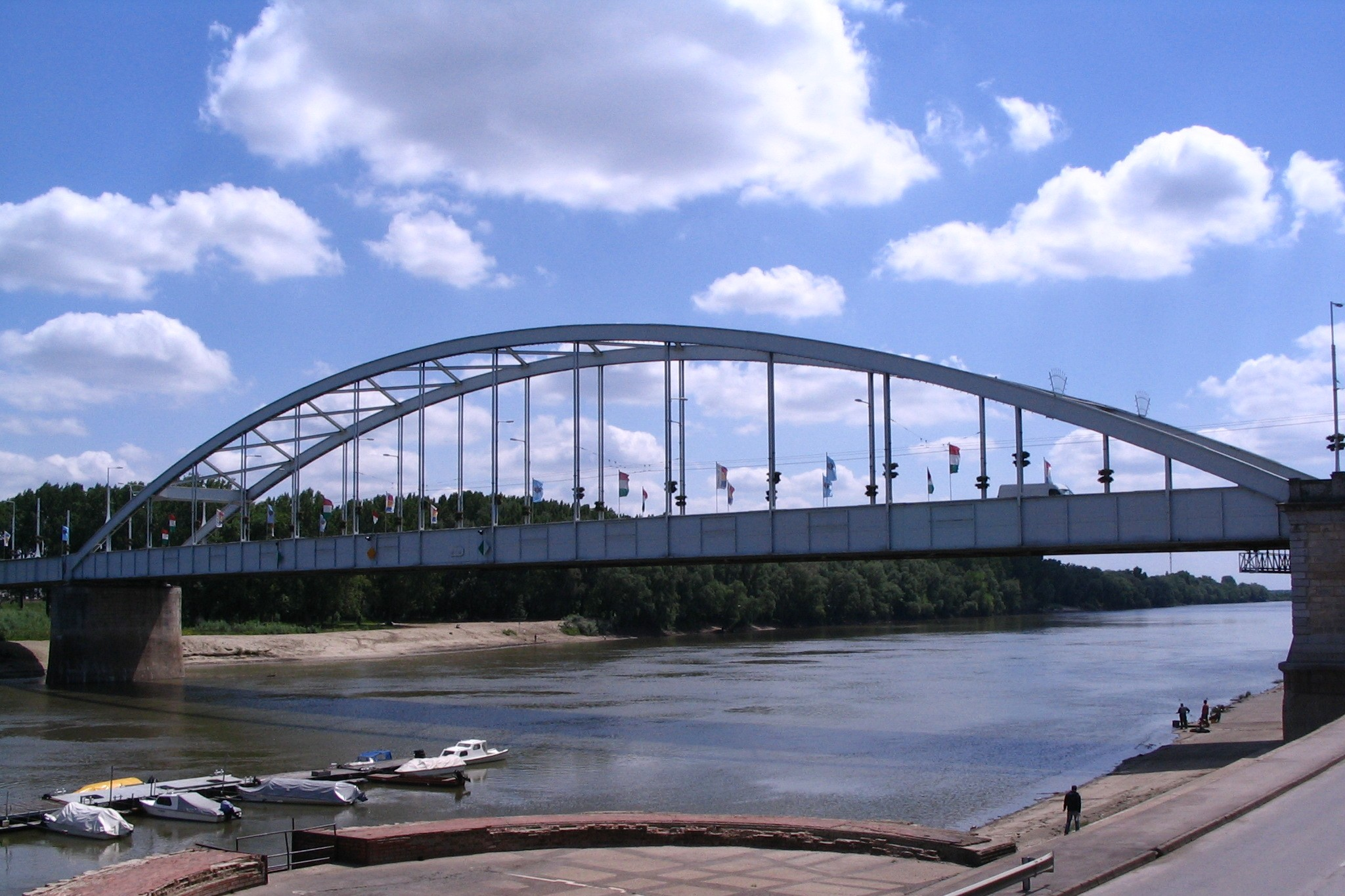
View from the Rakpart

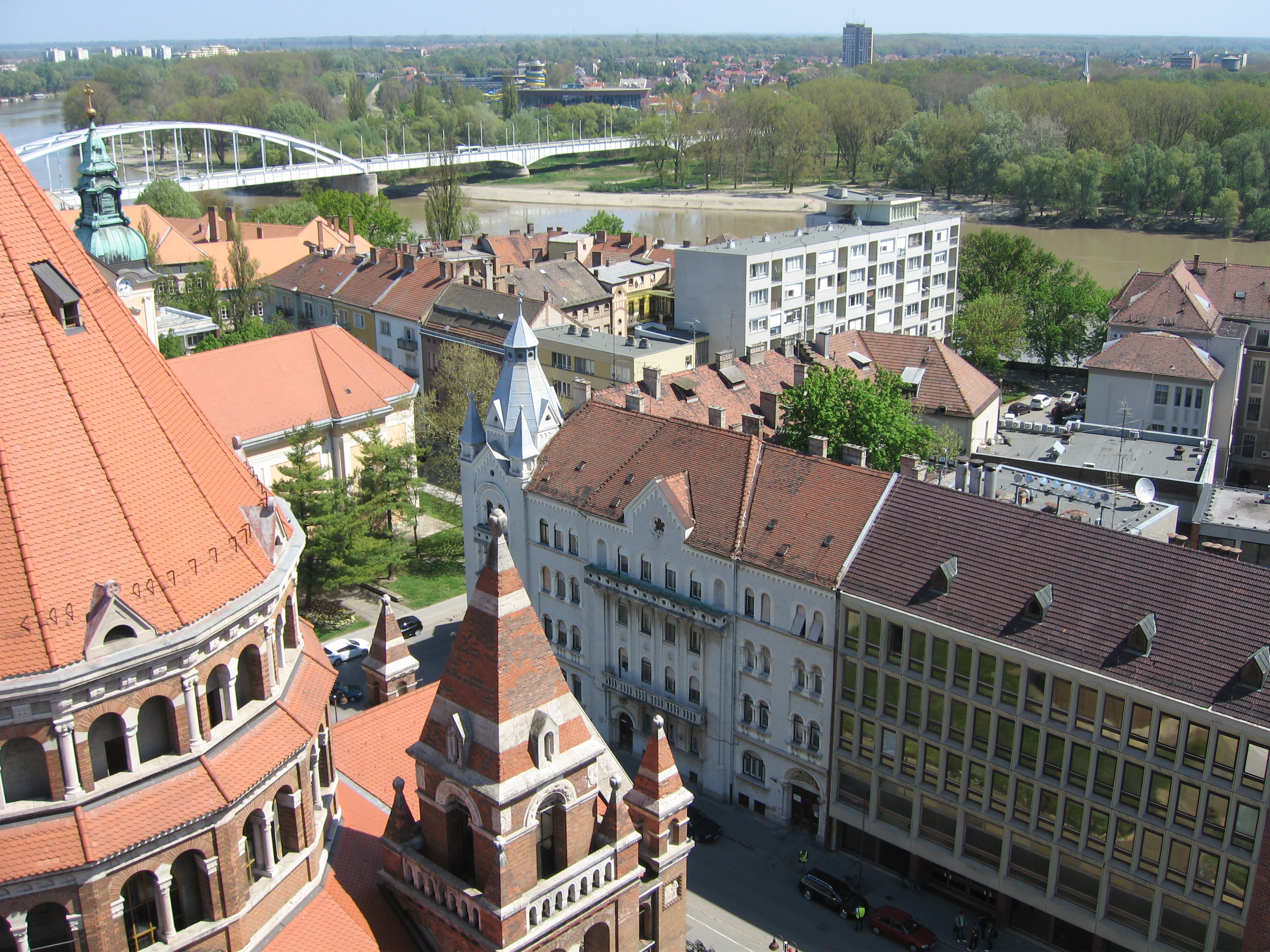
The Belvárosi Bridge from the tower of the Votive Church, Szeged

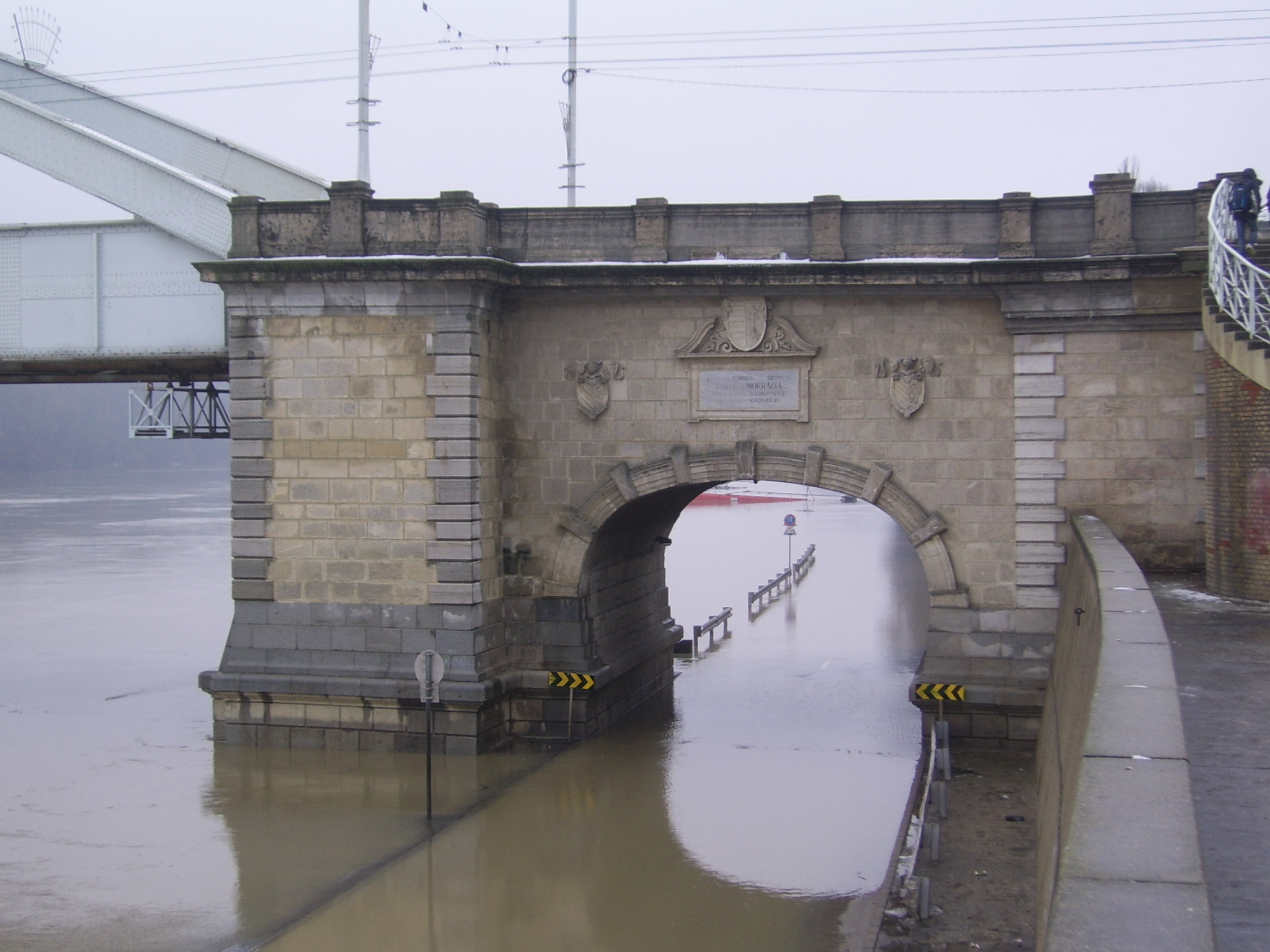
The Rakpart (Wharf) during a flood in 2010

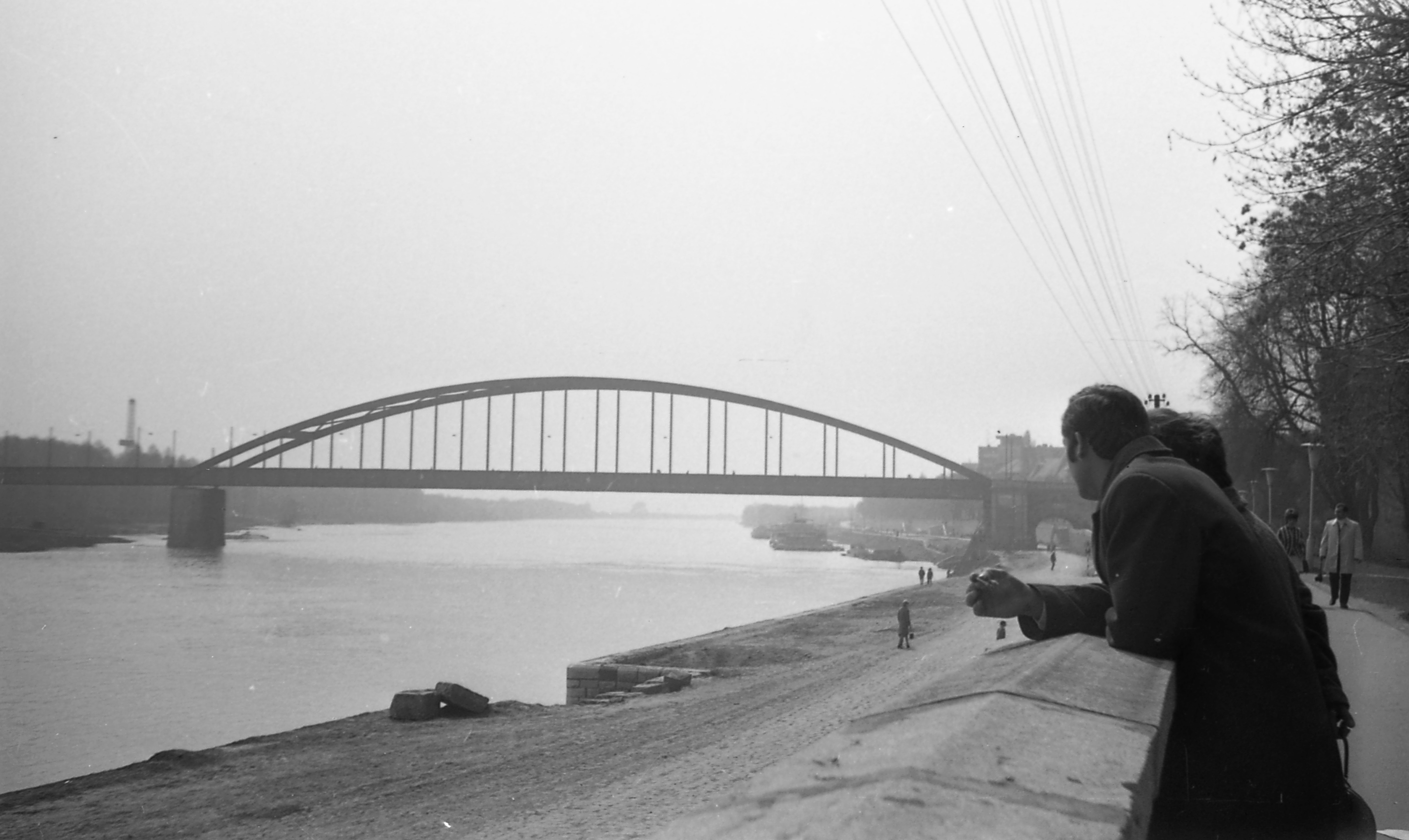
During the building of the Rakpart

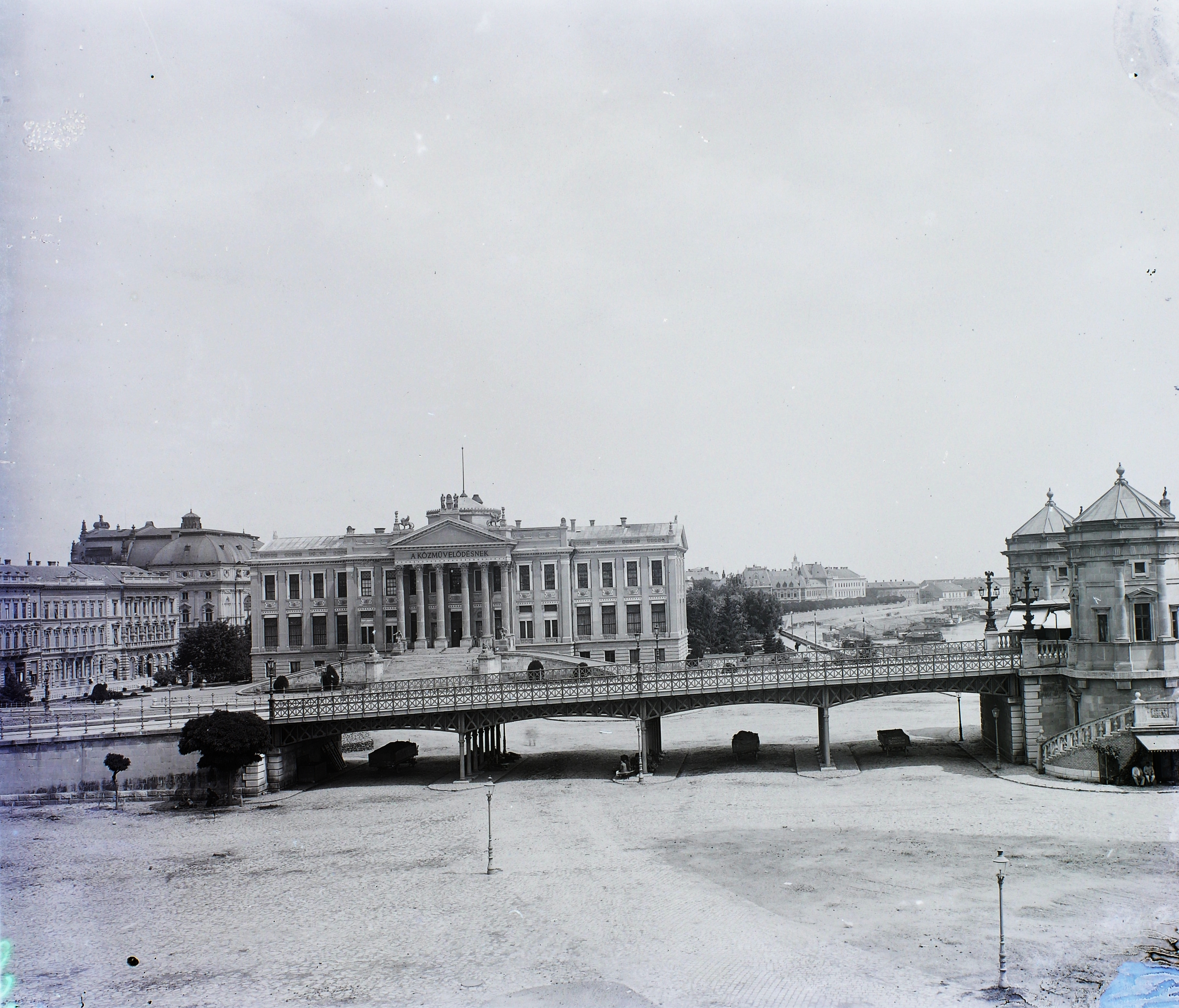
Ramps of the old bridge at Rudolf (today Roosevelt) Square at the right bank of the Tisza
