= Maurice Koechlin =

Franco-Swiss structural engineer and the designer of the Eiffel tower

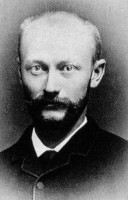
- Born: 8 March 1856; Buhl, France
- Died: 14 January 1946 (aged 89); Veytaux, Switzerland
- Relatives: See Koechlin family
- Engineering career
- Projects: Garabit Viaduct; Eiffel Tower
- Awards: Officer of the Legion d'Honneur

Maurice Koechlin (French: [mɔʁis keklɛ̃]; 3 June 1856 – 14 January 1946) was a Franco-Swiss structural engineer from the Koechlin family.

== Life ==
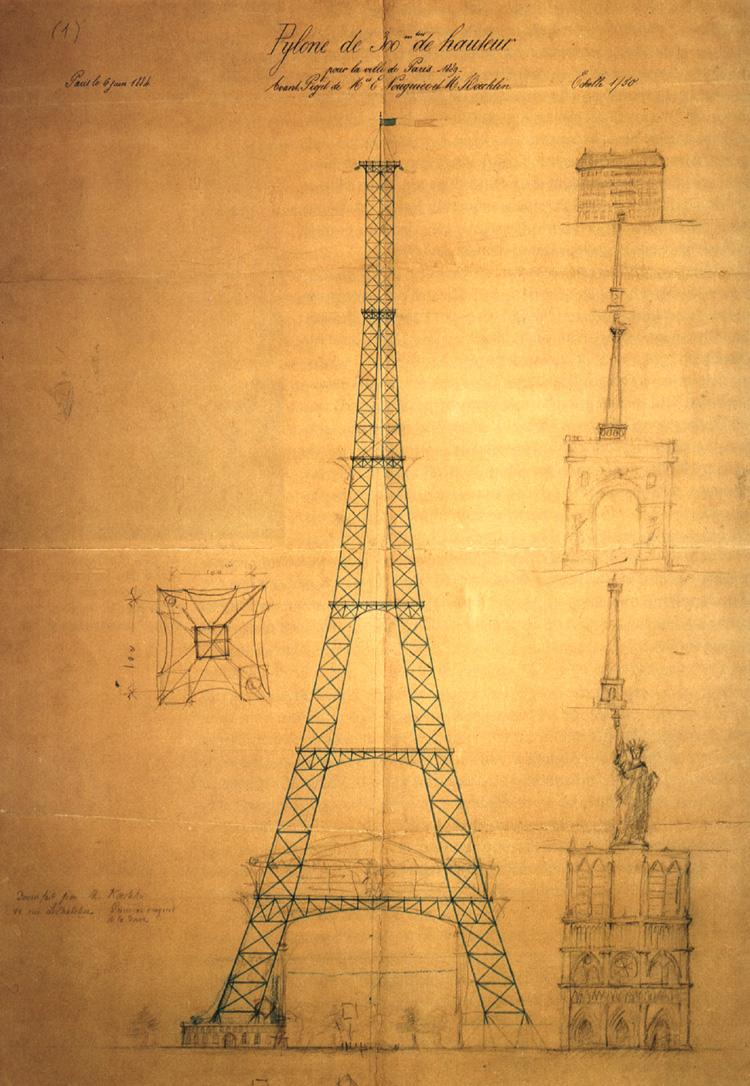
Koechlin's first drawing for the Eiffel Tower

A member of the renowned Alsatian Koechlin family, he was born in Buhl, Haut-Rhin, the son of Jean Koechlin and his wife Anne Marie (Anaïs), née Beuck. He was the first cousin once removed of André Koechlin, and the great-grandfather of actress Kalki Koechlin.

When France lost the Franco-Prussian War to Prussia in 1871 the entire Koechlin family decided to become citizens of Switzerland and thus dropped French citizenship. After the defeat of the German Empire in 1918, however, the Koechlin family again applied for French citizenship.

Maurice attended the lycée in Mulhouse, then between 1873 and 1877 studied civil engineering at the Polytechnikum Zürich under Carl Culmann. In 1876 he became a citizen of Zurich ("Zürcher Bürger") Between 1877 and 1879 he worked for the French railway company "Chemin de Fer de l'Est".

Much of his work was done for Gustave Eiffel's "Compagnie des établissements Eiffel", which Koechlin joined in 1879. In 1886 Maurice married Emma Rossier (1867-1965). They had six children: three sons and three daughters. Maurice and Emma were lifelong members of the Plymouth Brethren.

In 1887 he started work on his plans for the "Tour de 300 mètres" in Paris, along with his younger brother Henri Koechlin and civil engineer Émile Nouguier. Maurice Koechlin became the Managing Director of Eiffel's company when Eiffel retired from the engineering profession in 1893. The company was renamed Société de construction de Levallois-Perret.

Maurice Koechlin died in 1946 in Veytaux, Switzerland in a house built by himself in 1900.

== Major designs ==
Major structural designs include:

- Garabit viaduct, (1880–1884);
- Armature for the Statue of Liberty (Liberty Enlightening the World) - in collaboration with Frédéric Auguste Bartholdi, (1884); and
- Eiffel Tower, (1887–1889).

== Honours and legacy ==
- Officer of the Légion d'honneur.

Though named after a project of Gustave Eiffel, the Eiffel Tower – symbol of Paris – has its structural concept and form from the responsible chief engineer Maurice Koechlin. Koechlin was an engineer of outstanding ingenuity and well versed in the structural techniques of his time. He possessed therefore the best qualifications for evolving such technically innovative conceptions for which Eiffel and his firm were renowned.

— Trautz (2002)

== Descendants ==
- Kalki Koechlin, a French actress based in India, is a descendant of Maurice Koechlin
- Pedro Koechlin von Stein, a businessman in Peru (owner of Wayra Peru)
- Maria Violeta Koechlin Venturo Lima Peru

== Bibliography ==
- Koechlin, S. (2007a). "Maurice Koechlin". Site de la famile Koechlin (in French). Archived from the original on 2007-10-15.
- Koechlin, S. (2007b). "Maurice Koechlin et la Tour Eiffel". Site de la famile Koechlin (in French).
- Picon, A. (1997). L'art de l'ingénieur. Paris: Éditions du Centre Georges Pompidou. p. 253. ISBN 2-85850-911-5.
- Trautz, M. (2002). "Maurice Koechlin Der eigentliche Erfinder des Eiffelturms" (PDF). Deutsche Bauzeitung. 136{4}: 105–111. Archived from the original (PDF) on 2014-05-08. (in German)
- Walbrach, K. F. (2006). "Ohne ihn gäbe es keinen Eiffelturm: Maurice Koechlin (1856-1946)". Bautechnik. 83 (4): 271–284. doi:10.1002/bate.200610025. S2CID 109267234. (in German)
- Bergier, J.-F.; Fabre-Koechlin, M.; Dubas, P. (1990). "Dipl.Ing. Maurice Koechlin und der Eiffelturm" (PDF). Schriftenreihe der ETH-Bibliothek. 27. (in German and French)
