= Garabit viaduct =

Bridge in Ruynes-en-Margeride, Cantal, France

Garabit viaduct Viaduc de Garabit (French)
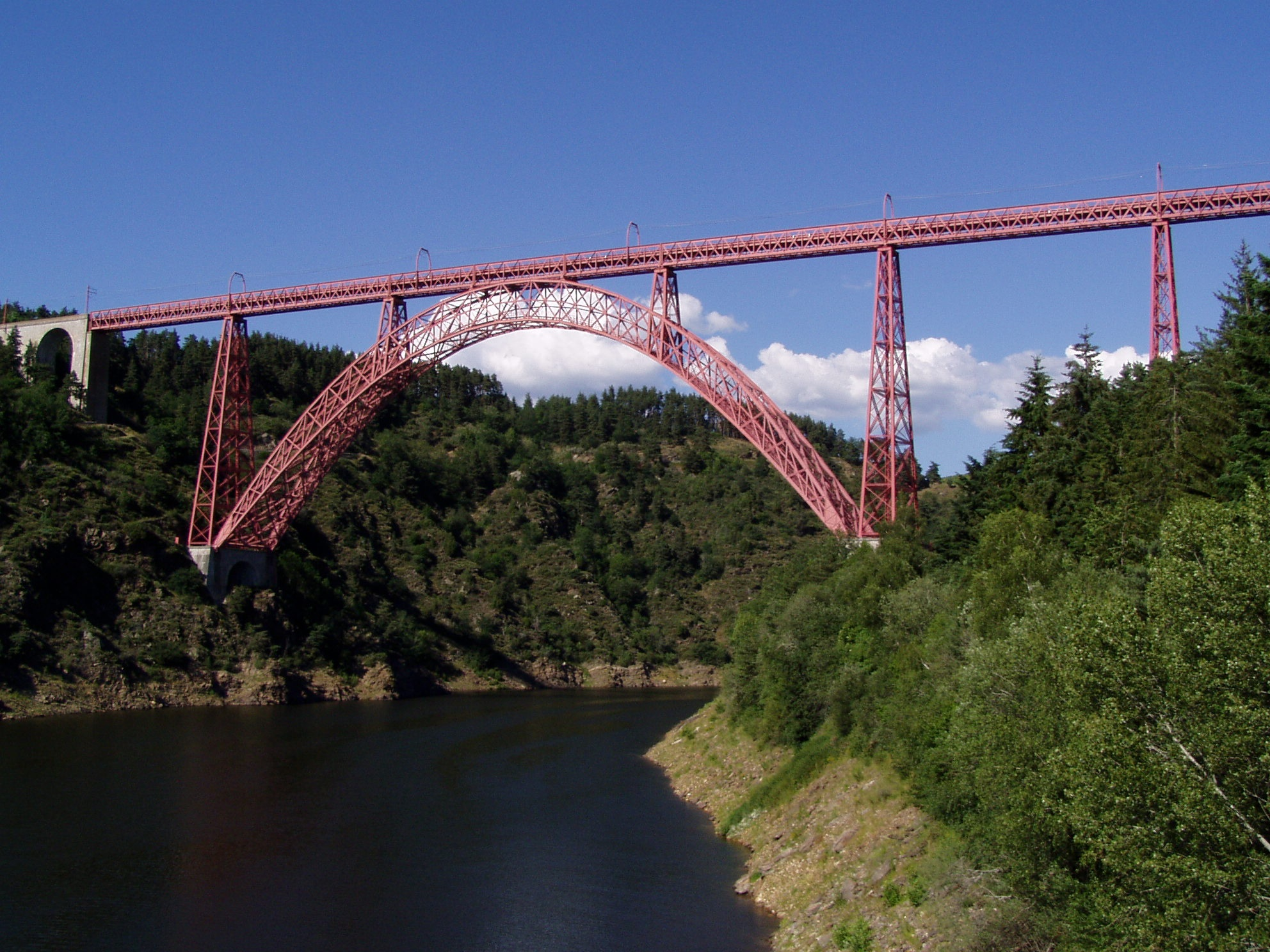
- Coordinates: 44°58′31″N 3°10′39″E
- Carries: Railway
- Crosses: Truyère river

Characteristics
- Material: Wrought iron
- Total length: 565 metres (1,854 ft)
- Width: 6 metres (20 ft)
- Height: 124 metres (407 ft)
- Longest span: 165 metres (541 ft)

History
- Architect: Gustave Eiffel
- Construction start: 1882
- Construction end: 1884
- Construction cost: 3,100,000 francs
- Opened: 1885

Location
- Interactive map of Garabit viaduct

The Garabit viaduct (French: viaduc de Garabit) is a railway arch bridge spanning the Truyère, near Ruynes-en-Margeride, Cantal, France, in the mountainous Massif Central region.

The bridge was constructed between 1882 and 1884 by Gustave Eiffel, with structural engineering by Maurice Koechlin, and was opened in 1885. It is 565 m (1,854 ft) in length and has a principal arch of 165 m (541 ft) span.

== Background ==
By the late 1870s, Eiffel & Cie, the company founded by Eiffel in partnership with Théophile Seyrig, had established a place among the leading French engineering companies. Between 1875 and 1877, the company had built the Maria Pia Bridge over the Douro at Porto, and when the construction of a railway between Marvejols and Neussargues, both in Cantal, was proposed, the work of constructing a viaduct to cross the Truyère was given to Eiffel without the usual process of competitive tendering. That was at the recommendation of the state engineers since the technical problems involved were similar to those of the Maria Pia Bridge. Indeed, it was Eiffel & Cie's success with that project that had led to the proposal for a viaduct at Garabit.

== Design and construction ==
Viaduc de Garabit - La Truyère

The Garabit viaduct, which uses a parabolic arch to support a single rail line across the gorge, opened in November 1885. The crossing is 565 m (1,854 ft) long and weighs (metric) 3,587 tonnes (3,530 long tons; 3,954 short tons). It cost 3,100,000 francs to complete (roughly €80 million in 2023).

Rail traffic using the bridge causes a deflection (load displacement) of about 8 millimetres (0.315 in), which was the same value as the one calculated by Eiffel. The bridge, which is 124 m (407 ft) above the river, had the world's longest arch when it was completed in 1884. This was surpassed two years later with the opening of the Dom Luís I Bridge across the Douro in Porto, Portugal in 1886.

Until 11 September 2009, one regular daily Corail passenger train passed each way from Clermont-Ferrand to Béziers. However, the viaduct was closed when cracks were discovered in one of the foundation piles. The Garabit viaduct reopened the following month after a safety inspection, with a speed limit of 10 km/h (6.2 mph) for all traffic.

== In popular culture ==
In 1976, it was used to represent the condemned "Cassandra Crossing" bridge in the film The Cassandra Crossing. In the film, the bridge is depicted as being unused and derelict for 30 or 40 years and is considered dangerous, to the extent that people living nearby moved away fearing it could collapse.

== See also ==
- List of bridges in France
