= Hypervelocity Wind Tunnel 9 =

Military hypersonic wind tunnel

Coordinates: 39°2′24.5″N 76°58′14.5″W

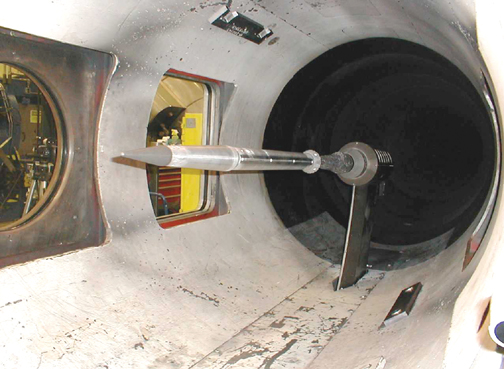
- Active: 1976–present
- Country: United States
- Branch: US Air Force
- Role: Test Facility

AEDC Hypervelocity Wind Tunnel 9 is a hypersonic wind tunnel owned by the United States Air Force and operated by National Aerospace Solutions The facility can generate high Mach numbers and high Reynolds for hypersonic ground testing and the validation of computational simulations for the Air Force and Department of Defense.

== History ==
After World War II, the United States brought German scientists and several critical facilities built by Nazi Germany to continue research into supersonic missiles. In July 1945, the custody of the Kochel wind tunnel facilities was awarded to the Navy to be installed at the Naval Ordnance Laboratory at White Oak, Maryland. In 1967, Congress granted approval for the construction of Tunnel 9. The facility became operational in 1976 and has since been providing aerodynamic simulation in critical altitude regimes associated with strategic offensive missile systems, advanced defensive interceptor systems, and hypersonic vehicle technologies.

== Capabilities ==
Tunnel 9 has 2.9 to 5 ft diameter test section. The facility can generate air flow up to Mach 14 with Reynolds numbers between 4 - 7.6 million per ft. Pressure and temperature can be controlled to simulate flight altitudes from sea level to 173,000 ft.

== See also ==
- Wind tunnel
- Shock tube
- Ludwieg tube
