= Aerodynamic and Propulsion Test Unit =

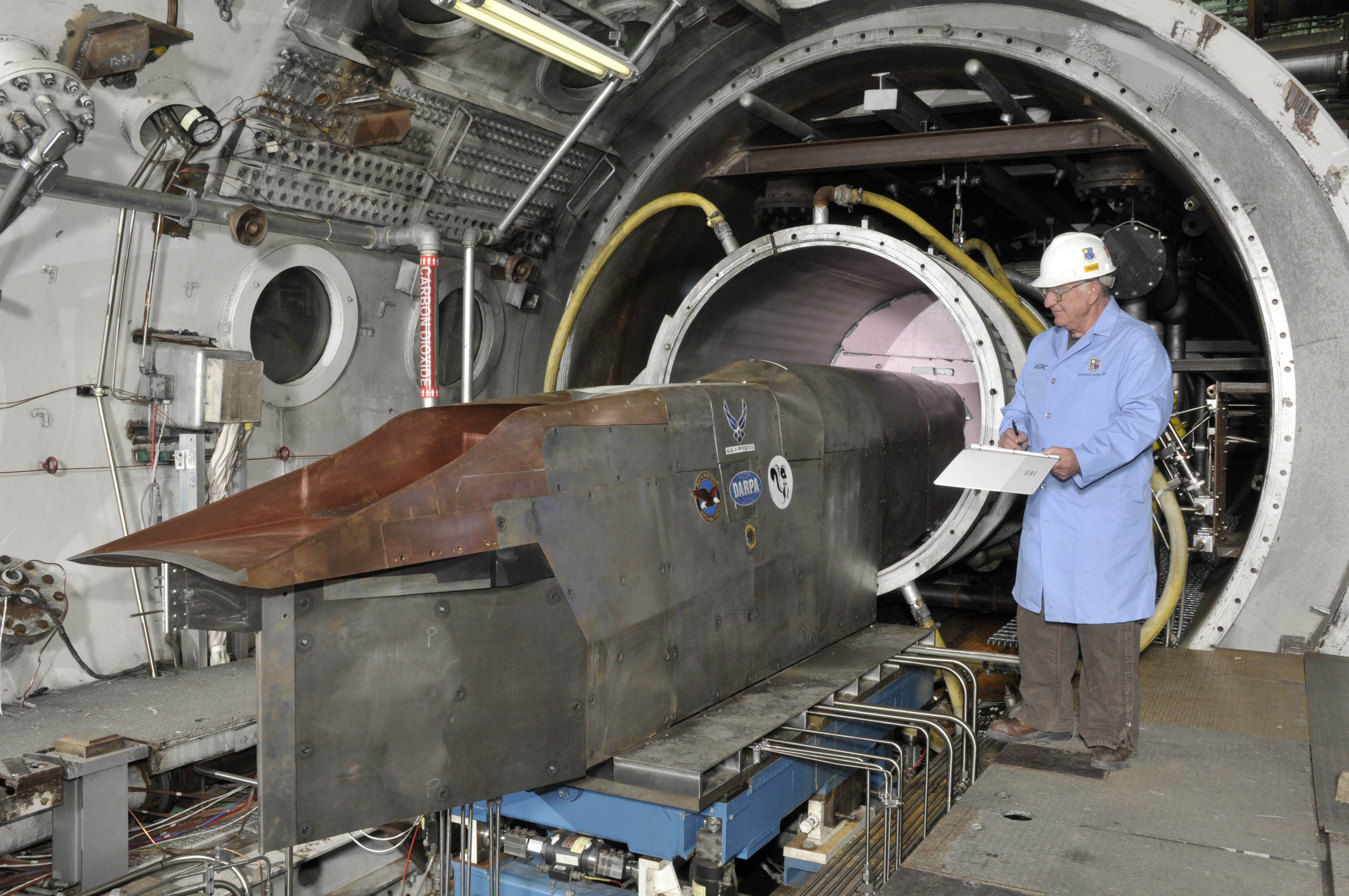
- FaCET Test in the APTU
- Country: United States
- Branch: US Air Force
- Role: Test Facility
- Nickname(s): APTU

AEDC Aerodynamic and Propulsion Test Unit (APTU) is a blowdown hypersonic wind tunnel driven by a combustion air heater (CAH). The facility is owned by the United States Air Force and operated by Aerospace Testing Alliance.

== History ==
The AEDC Aerodynamic and Propulsion Test Unit started out as a vitiated air heater (VAH) conducting over 275 experiments for the development of many different aerodynamic and aerothermal systems. Upgrades to the facility started in 2002 in order to provide ground-test capability for supersonic and hypersonic systems up to flight speeds of Mach 8.

== Capabilities ==
The facility was designed to provide ground-based simulations of supersonic and hypersonic flight conditions. The combustion air heater can provide total pressures from 200 psia to 2,800 psia (13.6 atm to 190.5 atm) and a total temperatures from 1,200°R to 4,700°R (667 K to 2,611 K). Five nozzles ranging from Mach 3.2 to Mach 7.1 are currently available.

== See also ==
- Arnold Air Force Base
- Supersonic wind tunnel
- Scramjet
