= Propulsion Wind Tunnel Facility =

Military wind tunnel facility

Coordinates: 35.3766°N 86.0457°W

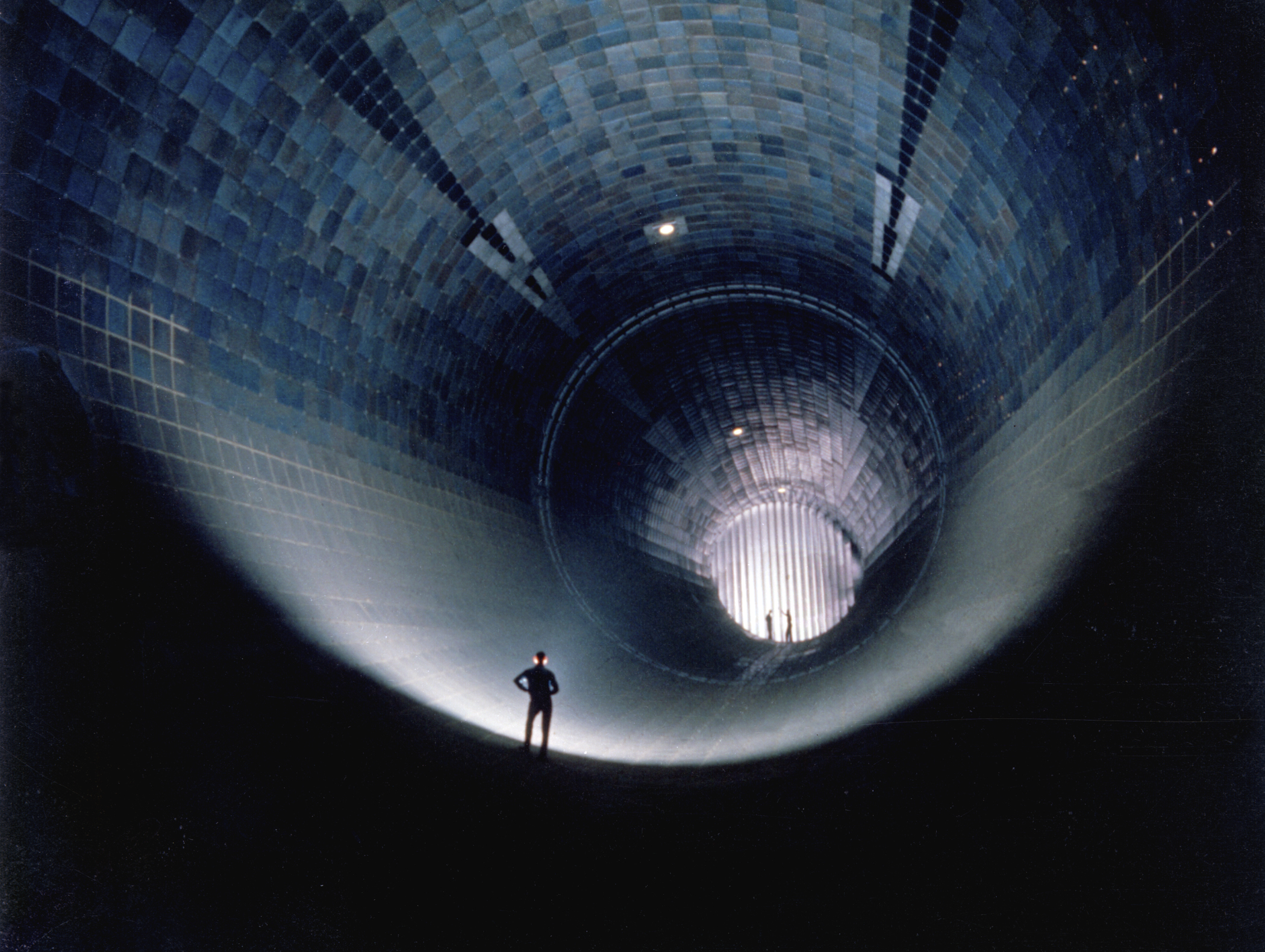
- Country: United States
- Branch: US Air Force
- Role: Test Facility
- Nickname: PWT

The Propulsion Wind Tunnel Facility, located at Arnold Engineering Development Complex, Arnold Air Force Base, Tennessee, holds three wind tunnels: the 16-foot transonic (16T), 16-foot supersonic (16S), and the aerodynamic 4-foot transonic (4T) tunnels. The facility is devoted to aerodynamic and propulsion integration testing of large-scale aircraft models. The tunnels are powered by a large compressor plant which allows the wind tunnels to run for extended periods of time. The test unit is owned by the United States Air Force and operated by Aerospace Testing Alliance.

The wind tunnel test facility has been designated a landmark by the American Society of Mechanical Engineers because of its engineering significance.

== Propulsion Wind Tunnel 16T ==
16T is a transonic wind tunnel that can be configured for Mach numbers from 0.05 to 1.60. It is primarily used to test aerodynamics, propulsion integration, and weapons integration test capabilities that are needed for accurate prediction of flight system performance. The 16-foot-square, 40-foot long test section can simulate unit Reynolds numbers from approximately 0.03 to 7.3 million per foot or altitude conditions from sea level to 76,000 feet. The tunnel can also test air-breathing engines and rockets through the use of a scavenging system to remove exhaust from the flow stream.

== Propulsion Wind Tunnel 16S ==
16S is a supersonic wind tunnel that can be configured for Mach numbers from 1.5 to 4.750. The test section is also 16-foot-square and 40-foot long. The facility can simulate unit Reynolds numbers from approximately 0.1 to 2.4 million per foot or altitude conditions from 43,000 to 154,000 feet. Currently 16S is in the standby state. 16S ran again for the first time in more than 10 years on May 7, 2015, after an 18 month return to service effort.

== Aerodynamic Wind Tunnel 4T ==
4T is a transonic wind tunnel test unit which has a 4-ft by 4-ft by 12.5-ft long test section. Mach number capability extends from 0.2 to 2.0. The tunnel can simulate altitudes from sea level to 98,000 feet and can provide Reynolds numbers up to 7.1 million per foot.

== See also ==
- Subsonic and transonic wind tunnel
