= AEDC Space Chambers Test Facility =

- Country: United States
- Branch: US Air Force
- Role: Test Facility

The AEDC Space Chambers Test Facility, located at Arnold Engineering Development Complex, contains several test units used for simulating space conditions. The facility has a variety of test cells to accommodate various sized test articles. Test articles range in size from the sensor level all the way up to full-scale space systems. All test units in the facility are owned by the United States Air Force and currently operated by Aerospace Testing Alliance.

== 7V ==
The 7V chamber is a deep space environment simulation test facility designed to test high performance interceptors and surveillance sensors at the conditions of deep space. The facility consists of a 7-foot-diameter by 21-foot-long chamber containing a full gaseous helium thermal shroud. The chamber is surrounded by a Class 100 Clean Room with an adjoining Class 1000 build-up area. The 7V chamber can be conditioned from atmospheric pressure to 10^{−7} torr.

== 10V ==
The 10V chamber is 10-ft. diam. by 30-ft. long and capable of being conditioned from atmospheric pressure to 10^{−7} torr. The test article can be placed in a class 100 clean room while the rest of the facility is housed in a class 10,000 clean room. The chamber itself is designed for testing space senors that look at various objects against the dark sky.

== Mark 1 ==
The Mark 1 Test Facility is a 42-foot-diameter by 82-foot space simulation chamber for full-scale space systems testing. The chamber can be conditioned from atmospheric pressure to 5×10^{−7} torr. The chamber can support test articles up to 200,000 pounds

== See also ==
- Arnold Air Force Base
- Vacuum chamber
- Spaceflight
