= High-Enthalpy Arc Heated Facility =

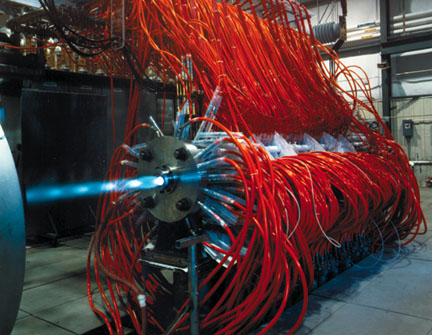
- Country: United States
- Branch: US Air Force
- Role: Test Facility
- Nickname(s): HEAT

The High-Enthalpy Arc-Heated Facilities at Arnold Engineering Development Complex provide aerothermal ground test simulations of hypersonic flight over a wide range of velocities and pressure altitudes in support of materials and structures development. The facility is composed of three Arc Heaters: HEAT-H1, HEAT-H2, and Heat-H3 which can heat air up to 13,000 degrees Rankine through a controlled high voltage direct current electric arc discharge. The test unit is owned by the United States Air Force and operated by National Aerospace Solutions.

== HEAT-H1 ==
The HEAT-H1 Test Unit is an advanced performance arc-heated facility providing high-pressure, high-enthalpy test conditions for qualification of thermal protection materials, nosetips, and electromagnetic apertures and structures for hypersonic missiles, space access systems, and re-entry vehicles. The test unit utilizes a segmented arc heater with 200 electrically isolated segments which form the heater plenum. The unique segmented construction, with the anode and cathode at opposite ends of the plenum, allows the arc to be held at a fixed length to optimize heater efficiency, total enthalpy at high pressure, and flow uniformity. Normal operating conditions for the heater are about 20,000 volts and 1,200 amps, providing heater chamber pressures up to 120 ATM at high stagnation enthalpies.

The H1 test cell is equipped with a multiple-strut, programmable rotary model injection system capable of positioning one to seven test models sequentially into the test free jet for preset dwell times. Transient calibration probes of various configurations are available to define heat flux and pressure conditions inside the test jet.

== HEAT-H2 ==
The HEAT-H2 Test Unit is an arc-heated aerothermal tunnel providing high-enthalpy flow at high Mach numbers and dynamic pressures simulating hypersonic flight at pressure altitudes up to 120 atm. H2 utilitzes an N-4 Huels-type arc heater to generate high-temperature, high-pressure air for expansion through a hypersonic nozzle into the evacuated test cell.

The combination of the arc heater driver, various nozzle/throat combinations, the evacuated test cell, and exhauster makes possible high-enthalpy flows at Mach numbers from 5 to 9. Direction and distribution of the injected air can be selected to optimize the enthalpy distribution across the flow to match specific test requirements. Run times of 20 minutes or longer are available in HEAT-H2 for selected operating conditions.

== HEAT-H3 ==
The HEAT-H3 Test Unit was developed to provide a large, high-pressure arc facility with sufficient size and performance for testing of full- and large-scale missile and re-entry samples and structures. H3 is a 12-module, 50-percent geometric scale-up of H1. The test unit is designated to operate at over twice the available power level and mass flow of H1, with operational pressure up to 150 atm.

== See also ==
- Arnold Air Force Base
