= AEDC Sea Level Test Cells =

- Country: United States
- Branch: US Air Force
- Role: Test Facility

The AEDC Sea Level Test Cells, located at Arnold Engineering Development Complex, is a collection of test cells used to economically perform durability testing on large augmented turbine engines at near sea level conditions. All test units in the facility are owned by the United States Air Force and currently operated by National Aerospace Solutions.

== SL2 and SL3 ==
The SL2 and SL3 cells are approximately 24 feet in height and width and 60 feet in length. In addition to running ambient pressure inlet conditions, they also provide the capability of using one of the complex's air plants to supply inlet pressures above ambient thus allowing testing at up to Mach 1.2. Inlet temperature capability extends from ambient to 120 degree Fahrenheit when running in the atmospheric inlet mode and from 20 to 270 degrees Fahrenheit in pressurized mode. Both cells can accommodate engines that produce up to 70,000 pounds of thrust. In recent years, SL-2 has tested the F100 engine for the F-15 Eagle, F-16 Fighting Falcon, and the F119 engine for the F-22A Raptor. SL-3 has also tested the Pratt & Whitney F100 engine, as well as the Pratt & Whitney F135 engine for the F-35.

== See also ==
- Arnold Air Force Base
- Flight Level
- Turbofan
