= AAFB =

AAFB may refer to:

- Altus Air Force Base, Oklahoma, US
- Andrews Air Force Base, Maryland, US
- Andersen Air Force Base, Yigo, Guam
- Arnold Air Force Base, Tennessee, US
- Eleuthera Auxiliary Air Force Base, Bahamas; see Eleuthera#Eleuthera AAFB
