= Gun tunnel =

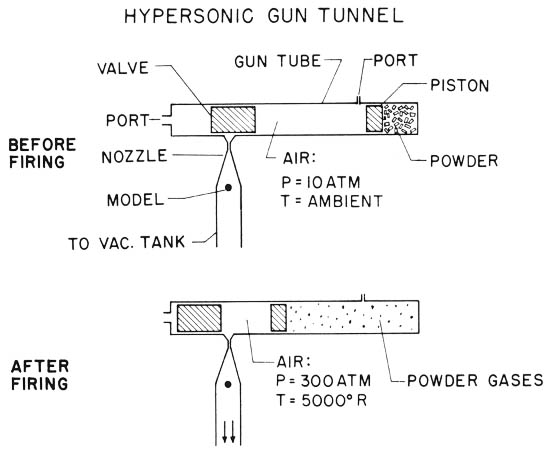
Schematic drawing showing principles of operation of original gun tunnel

A gun tunnel is an intermediate altitude hypersonic wind tunnel that can be configured to produce hypersonic flows at roughly 30 to 40 km altitude. This uses a piston for isentropic compression. The hypersonic facility at IISC Bangalore, India has a high enthalpy gun tunnel, which can produce Schlieren imaging and produce up to 8 megajoules of energy. Using a piston can be very tricky due to reflecting of shocks. At the facility, they use aluminium diaphragm to produce shocks and paper diaphragm to avoid shocks and pass through the hypersonic chamber. The pressure used is about 30 times atmospheric pressure.
