= 716th Test Squadron =

716thTest Squadron
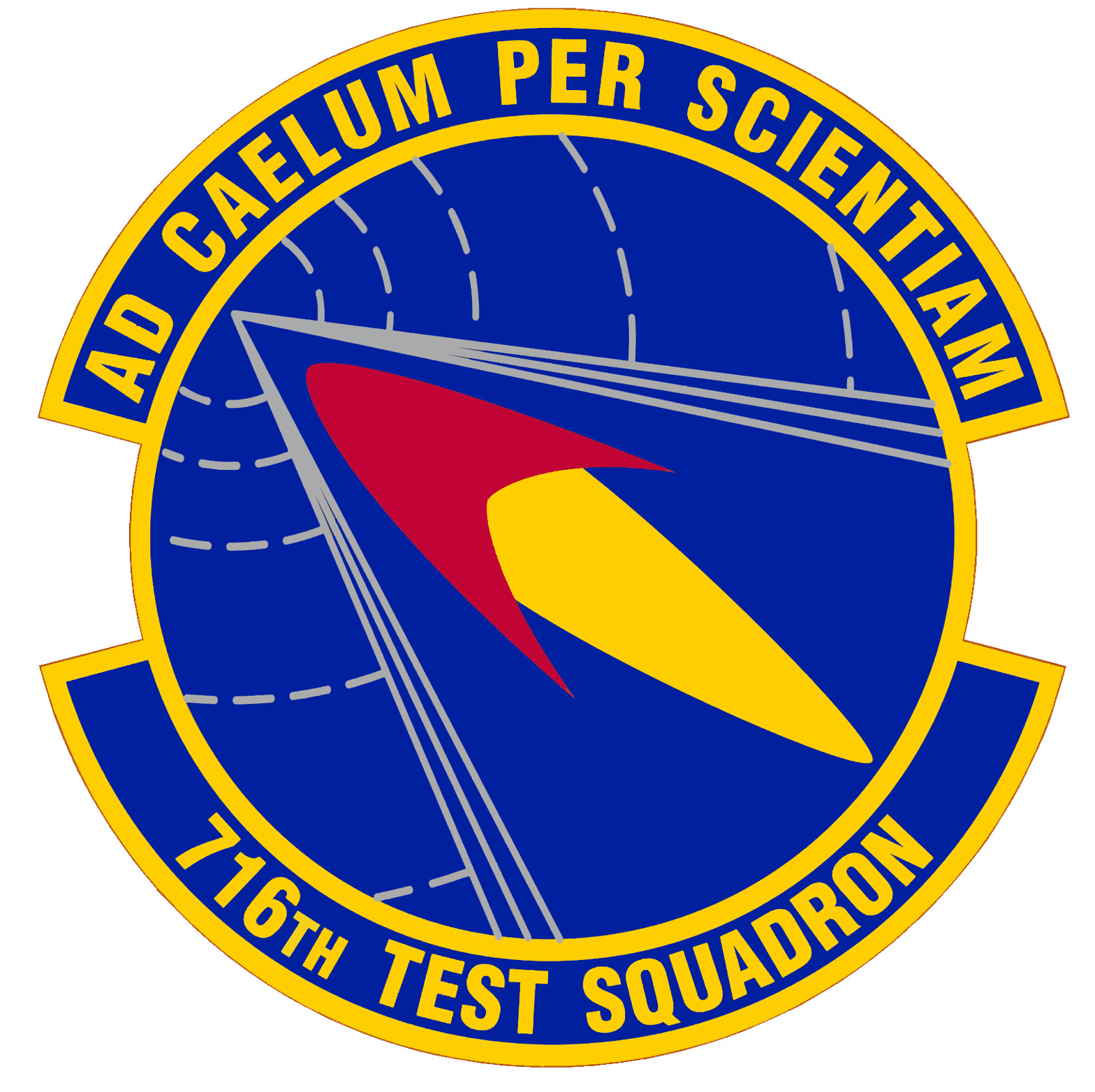
- 716th Test Squadron emblem (Note: Approved 16 January 2008 based on design approved for 6516th Logistics Test Squadron)
- Active: 1986–1997; 2006–2010; 2022–present
- Country: United States
- Branch: United States Air Force
- Role: Test and Evaluation
- Part of: Air Force Materiel Command
- Garrison/HQ: Arnold Air Force Base, Tennessee
- Motto(s): Ad Caelum per Scientiam (Latin for 'To the Skies Through Knowledge')
- Decorations: Air Force Outstanding Unit Award

The United States Air Force's 716th Test Squadron is a test and evaluation unit located at Arnold Air Force Base, Tennessee. The squadron was first activated as the 6516th Logistics (Test) Squadron in 1986 at Edwards Air Force Base, California. It was inactivated at Edwards in 1997, but reactivated ad Arnold Air Force Base, Tennessee in 2006. It was inactivated in 2010, but reactivated in May 2022.

== Lineage ==
- Designated as the 6516th Logistics (Test) Squadron on 15 May 1986

Activated on 1 October 1986

- Redesignated 716 Logistics Test Squadron on 2 October 1992
- Redesignated as 716 Test Squadron on 1 Oct 1994

Inactivated on 30 December 1997
Activated on 1 June 2006
Inactivated on 30 June 2010
Activated on 2 May 2022

=== Assignments ===
- 6510th Maintenance and Supply Group, 1 October 1986
- 6510th Test Group (later 412th Test Group), 10 March 1989 – 30 December 1997
- 704th Test Group, 1 June 2006 – 30 June 2010
- 804th Test Group, 2 May 2022 – present

=== Stations ===
- Edwards Air Force Base, California, 1 October 1986 – 30 December 1997
- Arnold Air Force Base, Tennessee, 1 June 2006 – present
- Arnold Air Force Base, Tennessee, 2 May 2022 – present

== Decorations ==
- Air Force Outstanding Unit Award

1 January 1996 – 31 December 1996
