= Camp Forrest =

U.S. Army training base in Tennessee

Coordinates: 35.3548°N 86.1523°W

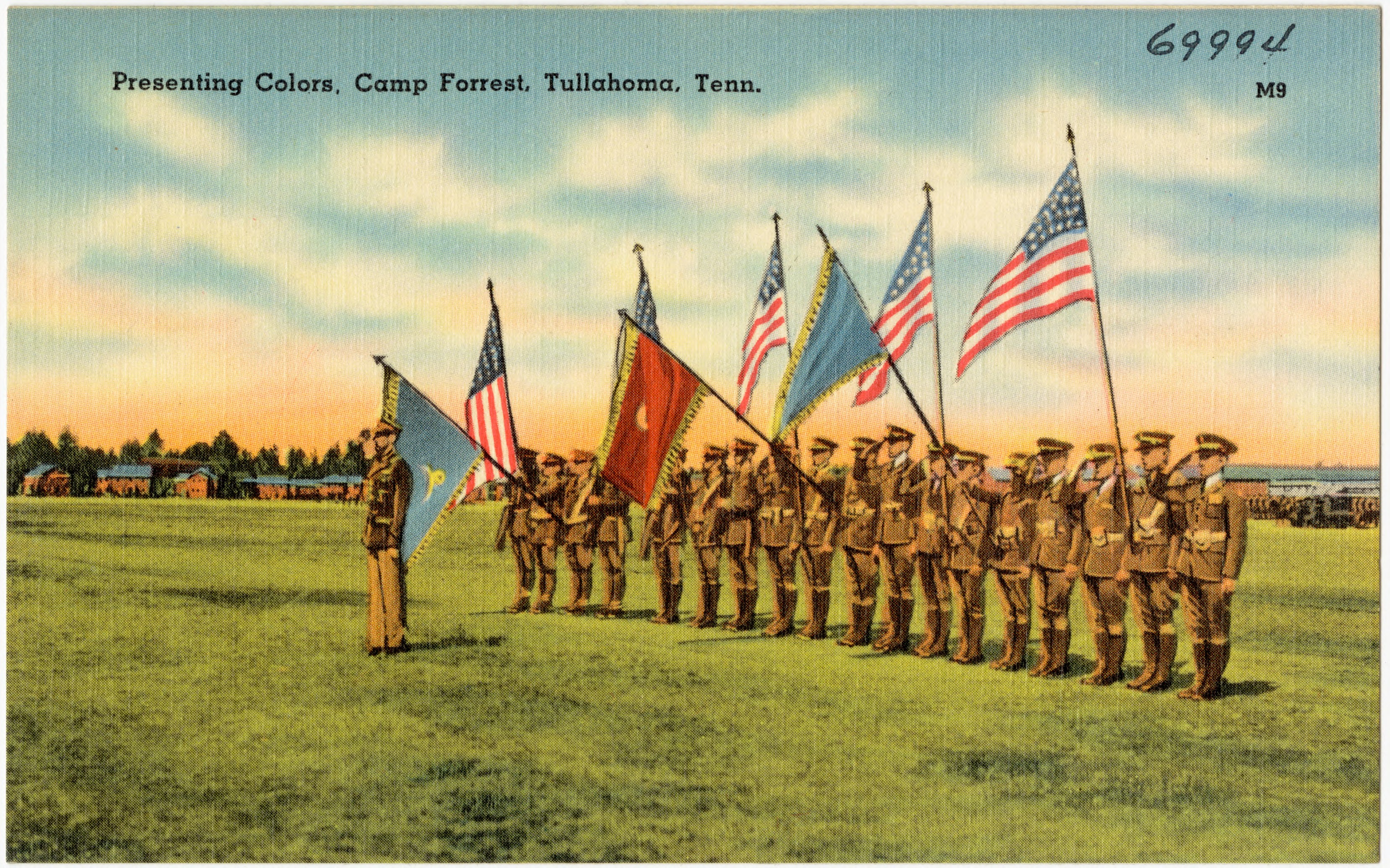
Postcard, c. 1930–1945: "Presenting Color, Camp Forrest, Tullahoma, Tenn."

Camp Forrest, located in a wooded area east of the city of Tullahoma, Tennessee, was one of the U.S. Army's largest training bases during World War II. An active army post between 1941 and 1946, it was named after Civil War cavalry Confederate General Nathan Bedford Forrest.

== History ==
Built in 1926 by the Tennessee National Guard, the 1,040 acres (420 ha) facility was named Camp Peay after then-Tennessee Governor Austin Peay.

In 1940, the U.S. Army took over Camp Peay and expanded it to 85,000 acres (34,000 ha) just beyond the camp's old boundaries. In 1941, the camp was renamed at the direction of Army Chief of Staff General George C. Marshall, because "it was not Army practice to name an installation used by federal troops after a local politician who did not have a distinguished military background," the Center of Military History would write.

Because the Army had leased Peay, he instructed the National Guard Bureau to contact the Tennessee state authorities for their recommendations on a new name. Furthermore, he directed that “the desires of the State authorities will be followed unless it is found that the name selected is unsuitable for psychological or other reasons.” The Tennessee adjutant general recommended Nathan Bedford Forrest, a native Tennessean whose birthplace was nearby. Despite the notorious reputation of Forrest, a prewar slave trader and then a founder of the Ku Klux Klan after the Civil War, the Historical Section and the G–3 accepted this recommendation. In January 1941, Deputy Chief of Staff Maj. Gen. William L. Bryden approved the name change. The Chicago Defender, an African American newspaper, took great umbrage at the name, and the Illinois legislature attempted (without success) to get the name changed when the state’s National Guard division reported there for training.

Camp Forrest was a training area for infantry, artillery, engineer, signal organizations, and cooks. It also served as a hospital center and temporary encampment area for troops during maneuvers. Major General George Patton brought his 2nd Armored Division from Fort Benning, Georgia, for maneuvers.

William Northern Field, an air training base, was an addition used by the Army Air Forces to train crews of four-engined B-24 bombers.

Incoming troops had amenities typical of military installations of the era: service clubs, guest houses, a library, post exchanges, a post office, hospital facilities, a chapel, theater, and barracks buildings. The camp was also home to Red Cross and Army Emergency Relief facilities. Recreation facilities included swimming, archery, tennis, a sports arena, and a nine-hole golf course.

Camp Forrest officially became a prisoner-of-war camp on May 12, 1942. The camp housed Italian and German POWs. Prisoners became laborers at Camp Forrest in the hospitals and on farms in the local community. The camp also held Japanese, German, and Italian-American civilians who were arrested at the outbreak of the war under a program called "Alien Enemy Control". Many of these internees were incarcerated without legal process. Official government documents made available in the late 1990s indicate that over 25,000 "alien enemies" were held at various locations throughout the United States. Camp Forrest's population was over 700, of whom about 200 were of Japanese ancestry. German internees at Camp Forrest published a newsletter titled The Latrine. In 1943, Camp Forrest internees were transferred to other internment camps to make room for actual POWs captured on the field of battle.

In 1945, the U.S. government implemented an Intellectual Diversion Program to educate Germans on the American way of life. This program used educational and recreational media to change views of POWs, and the government claimed success with many prisoners.

Tullahoma was greatly affected by the installation of Camp Forrest. The acreage used, for both Camp Peay and Camp Forrest, came from federal government confiscations from area families who had owned and worked the land for generations. This was usually done with little or no monetary compensation for those families. (One such family is the Baytes/Bates family of Franklin & Coffee Counties.) Because of maneuvers and operations, civilians had to adjust to blocked roads, traffic jams, crowded stores, the absence of mail delivery and driving at night without lights. Soldiers camped out on lawns and fields; many crops and fences were destroyed (without any compensation to the owners).

In 1940, the population in Tullahoma was 4,500. By the end of the war, the population had grown to 75,000. Many military people who moved in for construction and operation of the camp remained after the war. The sudden increase of population caused a drastic cost-of-living increase for the original inhabitants. Property values, property taxes, and everyday necessities all increased dramatically.

In 1946, the war was over and Camp Forrest and Northern Field were declared surplus property. Buildings were sold at auction, torn down and carted away. Water, sewage, and electrical systems were sold as salvage. All that remained were roads, brick chimneys, and concrete foundations. The camp's Sports Arena was bought by Lincoln Memorial University and moved to Harrogate, Tennessee, where it was rechristened as the Mary E. Mars Gymnasium. The building is still in use today by the school's volleyball teams and their academy's athletic teams and classes.

Soon after the close of the camp, instead of giving the land back to the original owners, the Air Force used it to build Air Engineering Development Center. In 1951, the center was dedicated by President Truman and renamed the Arnold Engineering Development Center in honor of General of the Air Force Henry H. "Hap" Arnold. General Arnold was World War II Commander of the Army Air Corps and the only air force officer to hold 5-star rank. The site has since developed into Arnold Air Force Base, with the Arnold Engineering Development Center still located there.

== See also ==
- Arnold Engineering Development Complex
- American Legion Hut (Livingston, Tennessee)
