= Supersonic wind tunnel =

Wind tunnel with high speed air flow

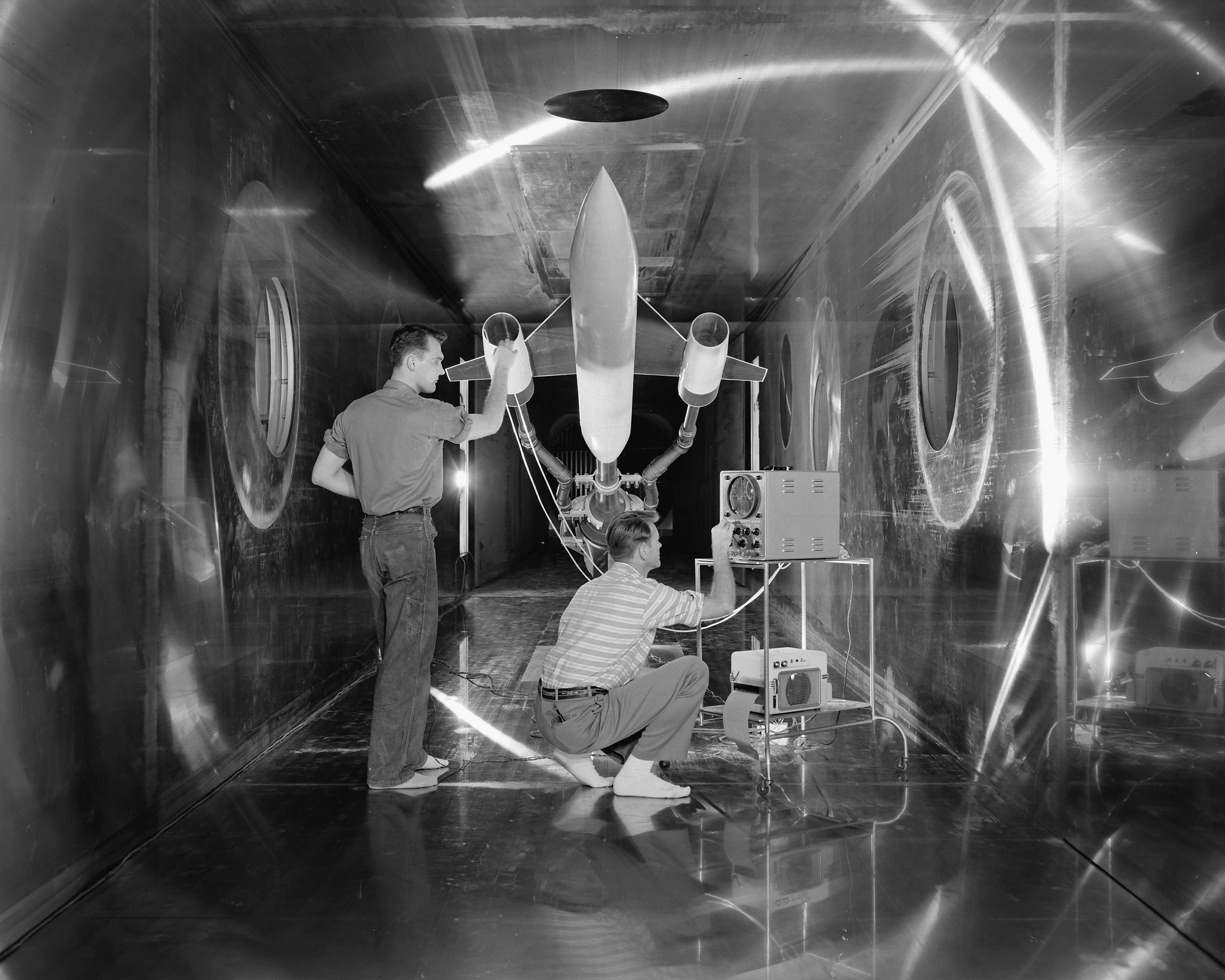
Engineers check an aircraft model before a test run in the Supersonic Wind Tunnel at Lewis Flight Propulsion Laboratory.

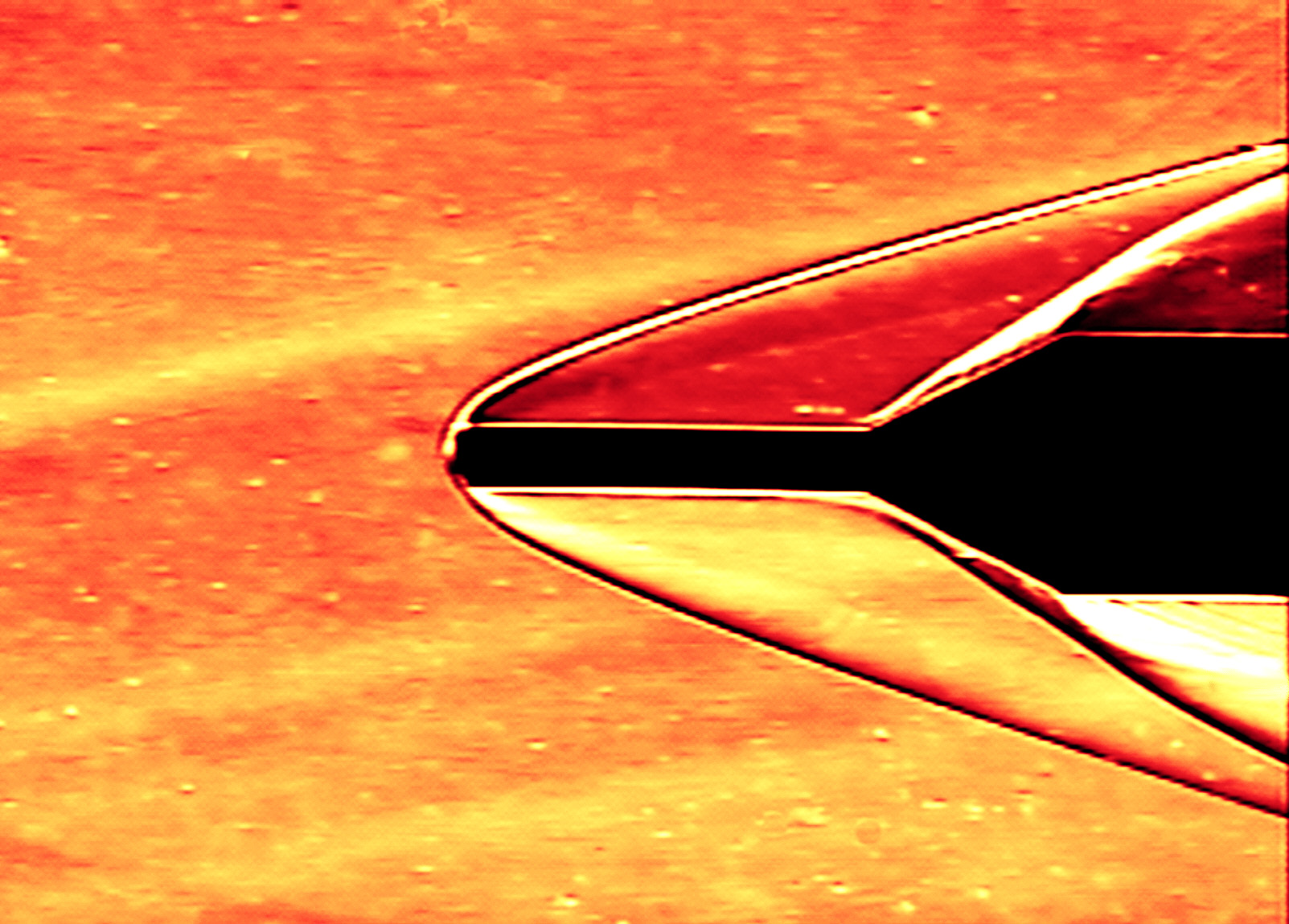
Schlieren photography is often used to capture images of gas flow and shock waves in supersonic wind tunnels. Here, Mach 4 flow over a pitot probe is observed by schlieren optics in the Penn State Supersonic Wind Tunnel. The flow direction is left-to-right.

A supersonic wind tunnel is a wind tunnel designed to produce airflow at supersonic speeds, typically within the Mach number range of 1.2 to 5. The Mach number and flow characteristics are determined primarily by the geometry of the converging-diverging nozzle. The Reynolds number can be varied by changing the flow density through adjustments to the settling-chamber pressure. During supersonic expansion, the static temperature of the airflow decreases, potentially causing moisture to condense or the working gas to liquefy. Therefore, supersonic wind tunnels may incorporate air-drying or preheating facilities to prevent condensation and maintain the desired flow conditions. Supersonic wind tunnels require substantial power to operate and are therefore often designed for intermittent rather than continuous operation. The first supersonic wind tunnel was built in National Physical Laboratory in England, and started working in 1922.

== Power requirements ==
The power required to run a supersonic wind tunnel is enormous, of the order of 50 MW per square meter of test section cross-sectional area. For this reason, most wind tunnels operate intermittently using energy stored in high-pressure tanks. These wind tunnels are also called intermittent supersonic blowdown wind tunnels (of which a schematic preview is given below). Another way of achieving the huge power output is with the use of a vacuum storage tank. These tunnels are called indraft supersonic wind tunnels, and are rarely used because they are restricted to low Reynolds numbers. Some large countries have built major supersonic tunnels that run continuously; one is shown in the photo. Other problems operating a supersonic wind tunnel include:

- starting and unstart of the test section (related to maintaining at least a minimum pressure ratio)
- adequate supply of dry air
- wall interference effects due to shock wave reflection and (sometimes) blockage
- instrumentation with high data acquisition speeds is required due to the short run times in intermittent tunnels

Tunnels such as a Ludwieg tube have short test times (usually less than one second), relatively high Reynolds number, and low power requirements.

== See also ==
- Low speed wind tunnel
- High speed wind tunnel
- Hypersonic wind tunnel
- Ludwieg tube
- Shock tube
