= Ludwieg tube =

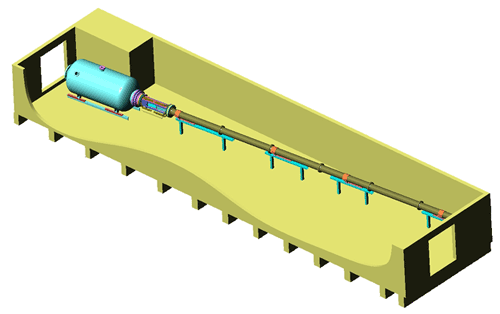
Ludwieg tube installation with a dump tank (left), nozzle and test section (center) and expansion tube (right)

A Ludwieg tube is a cheap and efficient way of producing supersonic flow. Mach numbers up to 4 in air are easily obtained without any additional heating of the flow. With heating, Mach numbers of up to 11 can be reached.

== Principle ==
A Ludwieg tube is a wind tunnel that produces supersonic flow for short periods of time. A large evacuated dump tank is separated from the downstream end of a convergent-divergent nozzle by a diaphragm or fast acting valve. The upstream end of the nozzle connects to a long cylindrical tube, whose cross-sectional area is significantly larger than the throat area of the nozzle. Initially, the pressure in the nozzle and tube is high. To start the tunnel, the diaphragm is ruptured, e.g., by piercing it with a suitable cutting device, or opening the valve respectively. As always when a diaphragm ruptures, a shock wave propagates into the low-pressure region (here the dump tank) and an expansion wave propagates into the high-pressure region (here the nozzle and the long tube). As this unsteady expansion propagates through the long tube, it sets up a steady subsonic flow toward the nozzle, which is accelerated by the convergent-divergent nozzle to a supersonic condition. The flow is steady until the expansion, having been reflected from the far end of the tube, arrives at the nozzle again. For practical reasons, flow times are about 100 milliseconds for most Ludwieg tubes. For many purposes, this flow duration is sufficient. However, by taking advantage of multiple quasi-static flows between expansion wave reflections, experimentation times of up to 6 seconds can be achieved.

== History ==
The Ludwieg tube was invented by Hubert Ludwieg (1912-2000) in 1955 in response to a competition for a transonic or supersonic wind tunnel design that would be capable of producing high Reynolds number at low operating cost. Professor Ludwieg was also responsible for the experimental demonstration and explanation of the large effect of sweep on the drag of transonic wings (his dissertation in 1937).

== See also ==
- Shock tube
- Supersonic wind tunnel
- Hypersonic wind tunnel
