= Arnold Engineering Development Complex =

U.S. Air Force flight testing facility

Coordinates: 35.379°N 86.050°W

Arnold Engineering Development Complex

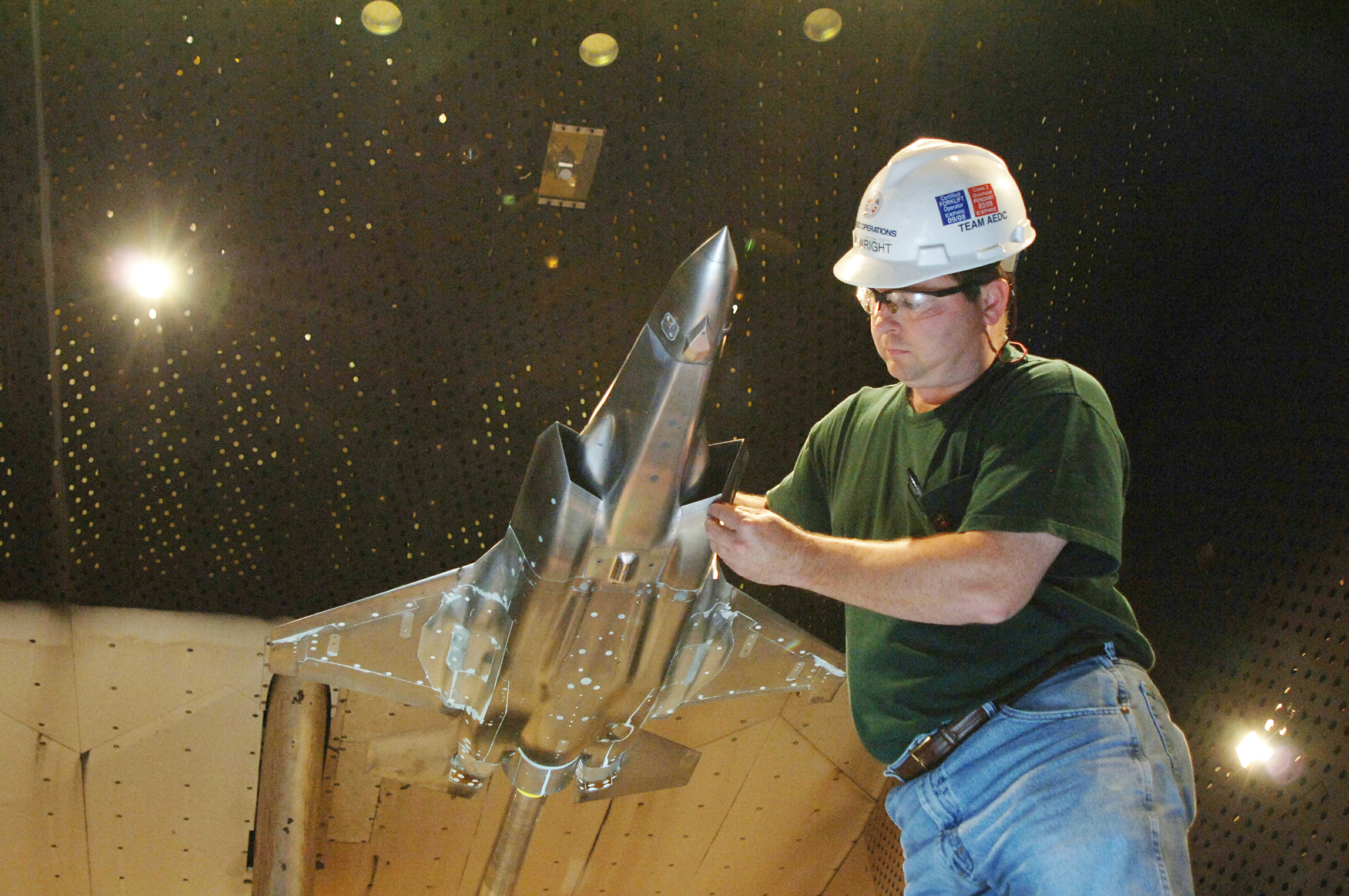
- An F-35 Lightning II Joint Strike Fighter model in the Arnold Engineering Development Center's 16-foot transonic wind tunnel
- Active: 1950–present
- Country: United States
- Branch: United States Air Force
- Role: Test facility
- Part of: Air Force Test Center, Air Force Materiel Command
- Garrison/HQ: Arnold Air Force Base, Tennessee
- Nickname: AEDC
- Patron: Gen. Henry H. Arnold
- Decorations: Air Force Organizational Excellence Award

Commanders
- Commander: Col. Grant A. Mizell

Insignia
- Arnold Engineering Development Complex emblem

The Arnold Engineering Development Complex (AEDC), Arnold Engineering Development Center before July 2012, is an Air Force Material Command facility under the control of the Air Force Test Center (AFTC). Named for General Henry H. Arnold, the father of the U.S. Air Force, AEDC is the most advanced and largest complex of flight simulation test facilities in the world.

Headquartered at Arnold Air Force Base, Tennessee, the complex also operates from geographically separated units at Ames Research Center, Mountain View and Edwards AFB, California; Peterson AFB, Colorado; Eglin AFB, Florida; the Federal Research Center at White Oak, Maryland; Holloman AFB, Kirtland AFB, and White Sands Missile Range, New Mexico; Wright-Patterson AFB, Ohio, and Hill AFB, Utah. AEDC operates more than 68 test facilities, including, but not limited to, aerodynamic and propulsion wind tunnels, rocket and turbine engine test cells, environmental chambers, arc heaters, ballistic ranges, sled tracks, centrifuges, and other specialized test units.

AEDC conducts developmental testing and evaluation through modeling, simulation, ground, and flight testing. The complex supports testing for a wide range of customers in the aerospace and defense industries, including, but not limited to, Air Force, Navy, Army, Missile Defense Agency and NASA.

Testing aims to evaluate aircraft, missile, and space systems/subsystems at the flight conditions they will experience during a mission. The complex aims to be the best value U.S. ground test and analysis source for aerospace and defense systems.

== Staff agencies ==
- Test Division
  - Turbine Engine Ground Test Complex
    - AEDC Sea Level Test Cells
    - Aero-propulsion Systems Test Facility
    - AEDC Engine Test Facility
  - Propulsion Wind Tunnel Ground Test Complex
    - Propulsion Wind Tunnel Facility
    - Von Karman Gas Dynamics Facility
  - Space and Missile Ground Test Complex
    - AEDC Space Chambers Test Facility
    - High-Enthalpy Arc Heated Facility
    - Aero-ballistic Range Facility
    - Aerodynamic and Propulsion Test Unit
- Maintenance Division
  - Support Asset Branch
  - Test Asset Branch
- Mission Support Division
  - Communications Branch
  - Civil Engineer Branch
  - Services
- Test Systems Division
  - Technology Branch
  - Investments Branch
  - Management Operations

== Environmental issues ==
Several areas of the facility are contaminated by substances including polychlorinated biphenyls (PCBs) and volatile organic compounds and spills of jet and rocket fuel, chlorofluorocarbon solvents, nitric acid and other materials. PCBs from the site have been detected in local creeks, in the water, sediment and in fish.

The site was proposed for addition to the Superfund National Priorities List in August 1994 though, as of May 2010, the site has not been added to the NPL. The Environmental Protection Agency believes that human exposure to contaminants and contaminated groundwater migration are under control.

== External facilities ==
- The Hypervelocity Wind Tunnel 9 is located in Silver Spring, Maryland
- The National Full-Scale Aerodynamics Complex (NFAC) is located at NASA Ames Research Center, Moffett Field, California. The NFAC was closed by NASA in 2003. In February 2006, AEDC entered into an agreement with NASA to lease the facility for a period of up to 25 years.
- McKinley Climatic Laboratory, Eglin AFB, Florida
- 704th Test Group, Holloman Air Force Base. Colonel Karl Seekamp officially took command of the 704th Test Group at Holloman Air Force Base during a ceremony on 9 September 2022. Detachment 1 operates the National Radar Cross Section Test Facility. The group consists of three squadrons, including the 716th Test Squadron, 1 June 2006 – 30 June 2010.
- Other Testing Facilities at Kirtland AFB, New Mexico; and at Wright-Patterson AFB

== History ==
The Air Engineering Development Center was authorized by an act of the 81st Congress, Public Law 415, approved 27 Oct. 1949 (Appendix 2).

On 7 March 1950, the Air Engineering Development Center was redesignated the Arnold Engineering Development Center (AEDC) effective 10 February 1950, per General Order #23, signed by then-Chief of Staff of the Air Force, General Hoyt S. Vandenberg. Arnold Engineering Development Center (AEDC) was later redesignated Arnold Engineering Development Complex (AEDC) on 6 July 2012.

The complex is a part of a master unitary wind tunnel plan that is designated to provide the testing "tools" required to assure the United States continued air and space supremacy.

The necessity for an aeronautical test complex of this type was recognized by a number of different agencies of the government, as well as by expert technical groups from the industrial-scientific world. The creation of these research and testing facilities has enabled the U.S. to stay abreast of developments in this fast-moving field.

AEDC is one of the most advanced and largest complex of flight simulation test facilities in the world with a replacement value of more than $7.8 billion.

At one time or another, the center has operated 58 aerodynamic and propulsion wind tunnels, rocket and turbine engine test cells, space environmental chambers, arc heaters, ballistic ranges and other specialized units. Twenty-seven of the center's test units have capabilities unmatched elsewhere in the United States; 14 are unique in the world.

Facilities can simulate flight conditions from sea level to 300 miles' altitude and from subsonic velocities to Mach 14.

AEDC's mission is to:

- Test and evaluate aircraft, missile and space systems and subsystems at the flight conditions they will experience during a mission to help customers develop and qualify the systems for flight, improve system designs and establish performance before production. It also helps users troubleshoot problems with operational systems.
- Conduct a research and technology program to develop advanced testing techniques and instrumentation and to support the design of new test facilities. Continuous improvement helps satisfy testing needs and keeps pace with rapidly advancing aircraft, missile and space system requirements.
- Maintain and modernize the center's existing test facilities.

AEDC is an important national resource and has contributed to the development of practically every one of the nation's top priority aerospace programs, including better spacelift, aircraft, missiles and satellites. Many of these programs are highlighted in the following sections.

AEDC is an Air Force Materiel Command (AFMC) organization managed by the Air Force but operated largely by a contractor work force. While AEDC's primary location is in Tennessee, it also operates two geographically separated facilities—the Hypervelocity Wind Tunnel 9 in Maryland, and the National Full-Scale Aerodynamics Complex (NFAC), in California.

AEDC's economic impact to the local area for fiscal year 2008 exceeded $728 million. The total economic impact includes the center's payroll, secondary jobs created locally though the spending of that payroll, and other expenditures for supplies, utilities, fuel and services.

As a consultant to General Arnold, Theodore von Kármán first called for the center:

In 1947 Stuart Symington became the first secretary of the newly independent Air Force, and he strove hard to bring into reality some of my proposals, particularly the new facilities for Air Force research which I had urged in the report.
One of the main items was a new U.S. center for the study and development of jet propulsion, supersonic aircraft, and ballistic missiles, a center I hoped would be greater than any then known. The proposal had actually begun after Frank Wattendorf's 1945 visit to the huge wind tunnel at Ötztal, Austria, which was bigger and more powerful than any in the United States.

Symington managed to round up sufficient support in Congress and to obtain the necessary funds, about 100 million dollars. The Air Force agreed to go ahead with the proposal to set up the center, and a committee was appointed which traveled around the country seeking a suitable site. One of the necessary requirements was a direct source of stored hydraulic power, as planned at Ötztal, to run the multi-thousand horsepower motors needed for the big wind tunnels.

Senator McKellar, Chairman of the Armed Services Committee, [made] a clever offer. He said the state of Tennessee would give up Camp Forest, a 40,000-acre World War II camp near Tullahoma, if the Air Force would set up its huge center there. Congress was about to adjourn and it looked like nothing would get done for another year. The Air Force, being realistic, accepted the offer ... The Arnold Engineering Development Center (as it was finally named) was dedicated in Tullahoma by President Truman in 1952.

The center operates more than 68 aerodynamic and propulsion wind tunnels, rocket and turbine engine test cells, space environmental chambers, arc heaters, ballistic ranges, and other specialized units. Currently, AEDC's Test Operations and Sustainment contractor is Beyond New Horizons.

The center has helped to develop most aerospace systems in the U.S. government's inventory, including the Atlas, Titan, Minuteman and Peacekeeper ICBMs, the Space Shuttle, space station, and Projects Mercury, Gemini and Apollo.

It is named for General Henry "Hap" Arnold, the father of the US Air Force and an air power visionary. The University of Tennessee Space Institute (UTSI) is located adjacent to AEDC.

The center lies near Manchester, Tennessee and Tullahoma, Tennessee, and occupies much of the site of the former Camp Forrest, a U.S. Army base and World War II POW camp. It is unique in that the majority of the workforce are contract personnel, with a small contingent of active-duty assigned.

"The Air Force Test Center (AFTC) started an organizational change process in 2015 to move some units within the AFTC from the 96th and 412th Test Wings over to the AEDC. The largest change [was] the renumbering of the 96th Test Group as the 704th Test Group at Holloman AFB, NM. AEDC ..also [gained] the McKinley Climatic Laboratory at Eglin AFB, FL, and the Hypersonic Combined Test Force at Edwards AFB, CA." The changes took effect on 1 December 2016. It was planned to align "..most of the Air Force’s developmental ground test facilities under one commander, better fiscal synergy, especially in restoration and modernization funds, better balance in the span of control, and finally results in developmental opportunities for AFTC officers."

== Lineage ==
- Constituted as the Air Engineering Development Division on 27 October 1949 by the 81st Congress, Public Law 415.

Redesignated Arnold Engineering Development Center on 7 March 1950 effective 10 February 1950, per General Order #23, signed by then Chief of Staff of the Air Force General Hoyt S. Vandenburg.
Redesignated Arnold Engineering Development Complex on 6 July 2012

=== Assignments ===
- United States Air Force: 7 March 1950
- Air Research and Development Command (later Air Force Systems Command), 1 May 1951
- Air Force Materiel Command, 1 July 1992 (attached to Air Force Test Center after 6 July 2012)
- Air Force Test Center, 1 October 2012

=== Stations ===
- Arnold Air Force Station (later Arnold Air Force Base), 25 June 1951 – present

=== Components ===
- 704th Maintenance Group, 1 June 2006 – 30 June 2010
- 704th Mission Support Group, 1 June 2006 – 30 June 2010
- 704th Test Group, 1 June 2006 – 30 June 2010 (Arnold AFB); 1 December 2016 - onwards (Holloman AFB, NM)
- 704th Test Systems Group, 1 June 2006 – 30 June 2010
- 6560th Air Base Squadron (later 4960th Air Base Squadron, 4960th Air Base Group, 656th Support Squadron, 656th Air Base Squadron), 8 May 1951 – c. 1997
