= MARHy Wind Tunnel =

Research facility in France

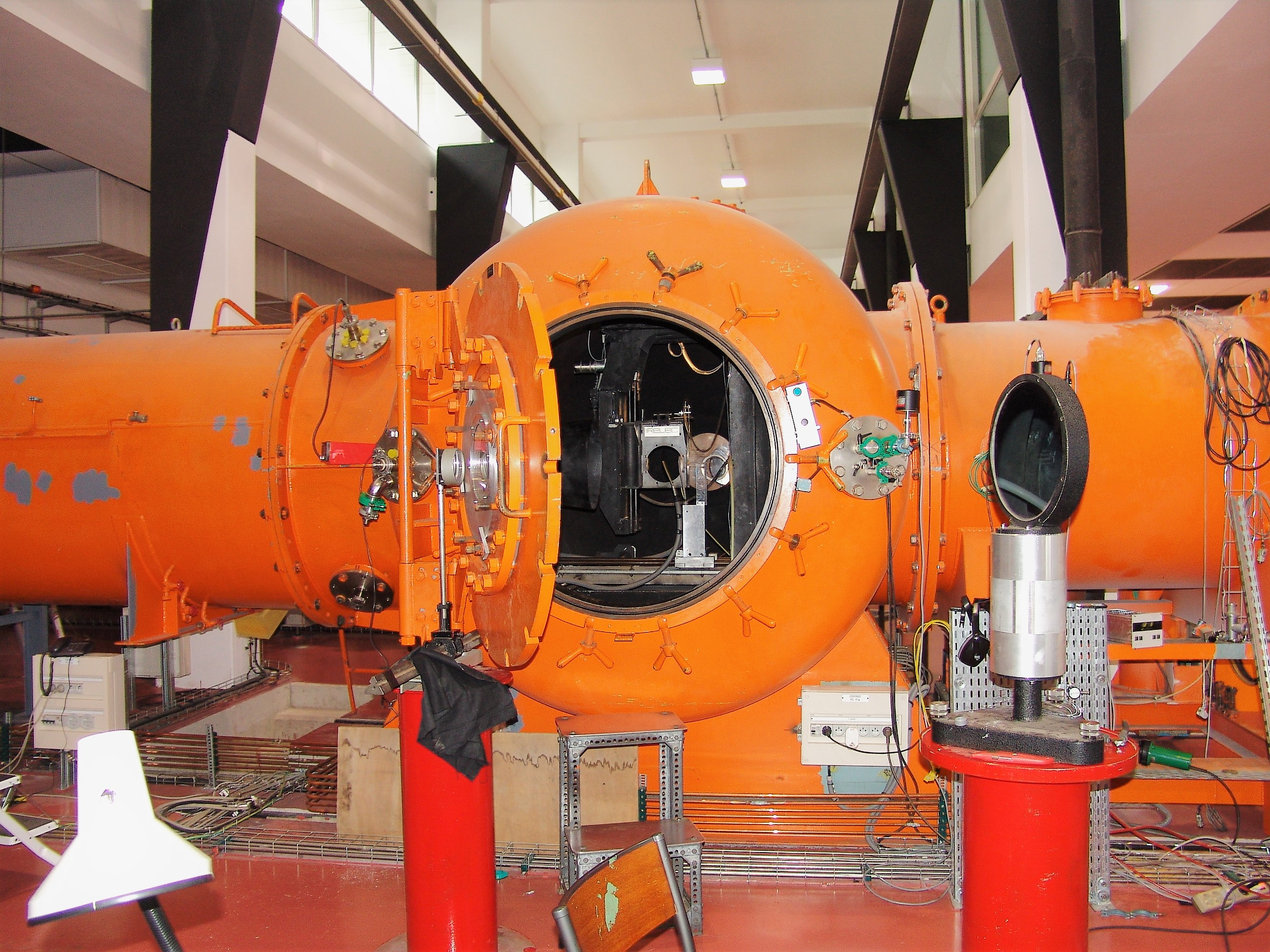
Photo of the wind tunnel MARHy

The MARHy Hypersonic low density Wind Tunnel, located at the ICARE Laboratory in Orléans, France, is a research facility used extensively for fundamental and applied research of fluid dynamic phenomena in rarefied compressible flows. Its name is an acronym for Mach Adaptable Rarefied Hypersonic, and the wind tunnel is recorded under this name in the European portal MERIL.

The facility was completed in 1963 and is one of the three facilities belonging to the FAST platform (composed of two other wind tunnels) and used in the aim of supporting aeronautics and aerospace research.

== History ==
In 1962, the CNES (France's National Centre for Space Studies) decided to build a low density and high-speed wind tunnel essential for aerodynamic and aerothermal studies in rarefied gas flows. This wind tunnel called SR3 was located in the Aerothermodynamics Laboratory from the CNRS (France's national scientific research center) in Meudon. The construction of the facility was delegated to the SESSIA (engineering consultants for aeronautical industrial works) and was achieved in 1963. The wind tunnel was then moved to the ICARE Laboratory in Orléans in 2000, as a result of the merging of the Aerothermodynamics Laboratory and the LCSR (Combustion and Reactive Systems Laboratory). Then, it was renamed MARHy which is the acronym for Mach Adaptable Rarefied Hypersonic.

== Technical details ==
MARHy is a unique facility in Europe delivering low pressure, super/hypersonic flow in a continuous mode. It is an open-jet wind tunnel. Dimensions: The wind tunnel is composed of 3 parts:

- a settling chamber: length of 2.6 m, internal diameter of 1.2 m. It is equipped with a flow breaking cone.
- a cylindrical test chamber: length of 3.5 m, diameter of 2 m.
- a diffusor going to the pumping room: length of 10m and diameter of 1.4 m.

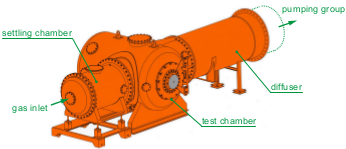
Scheme of the wind tunnel MARHy.

Regarding the flow conditions and the rarefaction level, two types of pumping groups are available. 19 different types of flows can be generated, requiring specific generating conditions and thus, relying on variable vacuum pressures. Indeed, for high densities flows, 14 Roots blowers are associated to 2 rotary vacuum pumps. A wide range of nozzles with various exits shapes going from cylindrical to a truncated cone with an interchangeable col allows an operating domain from subsonic to hypersonic. When a diffusor is added in the extension of the test chamber, a static pressure below 1 micrometer of mercury can be reached.

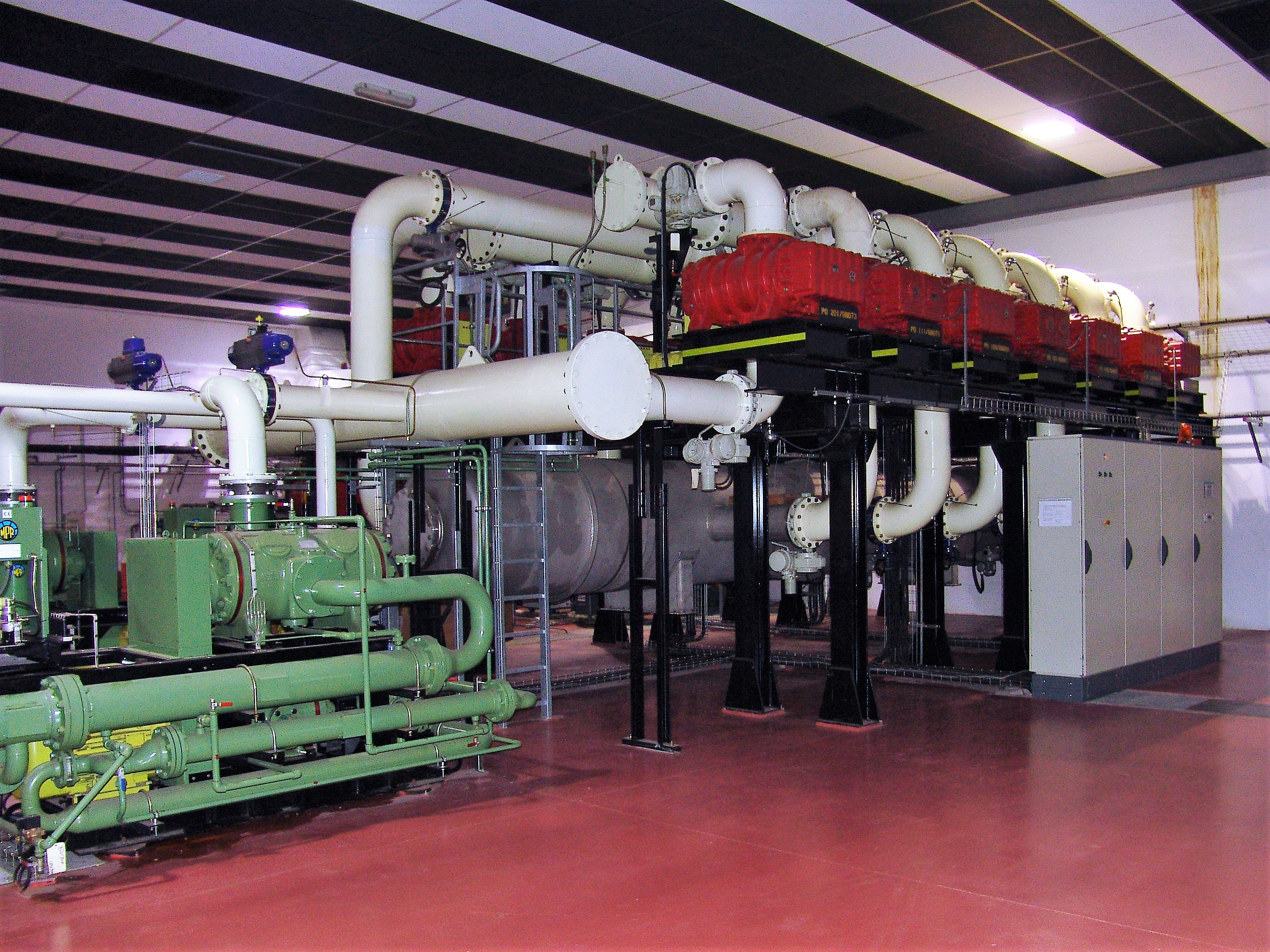
Photo of the pumping group.

Mach number M	Reynolds number Re/cm	Static Pressure P1 (Pa)	Static Temperature T1 (K)
0.6	3.7 × 10^{1}	27	280
0.8	5.3 × 10^{1}	27	266
2	6 × 10^{4}	6.1 × 10^{3}	163
2	2.7 × 10^{1}	2.7	163
2	8 × 10^{1}	8	163
4	1.8 × 10^{2}	2.7	70
4	5.7 × 10^{2}	8	70
4	5 × 10^{3}	71.1	70
6.8	3.55 × 10^{2}	5.02	97
12	1.19 × 10^{3}	1.38	27
14.9	4.58 × 10^{3}	3.17	22
15.1	1.10 × 10^{3}	0.72	21
15.3	4.24 × 10^{2}	0.26	21
16	11.17 × 10^{2}	0.58	20
16.5	59 × 10^{2}	3.15	20
18.4	7.52 × 10^{3}	2.98	18
20	8.38 × 10^{2}	0.21	14
20.2	2.85 × 10^{2}	0.07	13
21.1	6.68 × 10^{3}	1.73	14

== Tunnel instrumentation ==
Various types of diagnostics are associated to the wind tunnel MARHy: Pitot Probes, Pressure sensors for parietal measurements, Heat transfer gauges, Infrared thermography camera, iCCD camera & luminescence technique, Aerodynamic balance, Electrostatic probes, Optical spectrometry (near IR, visible and VUV), Electron gun. They are employed for fundamental and applied studies in the fields of Compressible Aerodynamics, Aerothermodynamics, Atmospheric entries and Gas and Plasma Physics.

== Research Applications ==
The wind tunnel MARHy is extensively used for fundamental and applied research of fluid dynamic phenomena in rarefied hypersonic and supersonic flows.

- Flowfied characterization of hypersonic and supersonic rarefied flows around models (density, aerodynamic forces, pressure...)
- Structure of wakes in hypersonic and supersonic rarefied flows
- Atmospheric entry aerodynamics at high altitude
- Plasma flow control
- Space debris atmospheric entry, ...

,

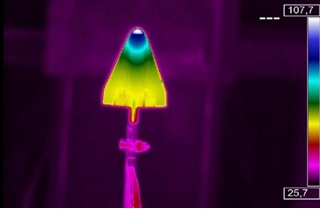
Thermal_Hermes_M20_IR_MARHY_ICARE

== Gallery ==
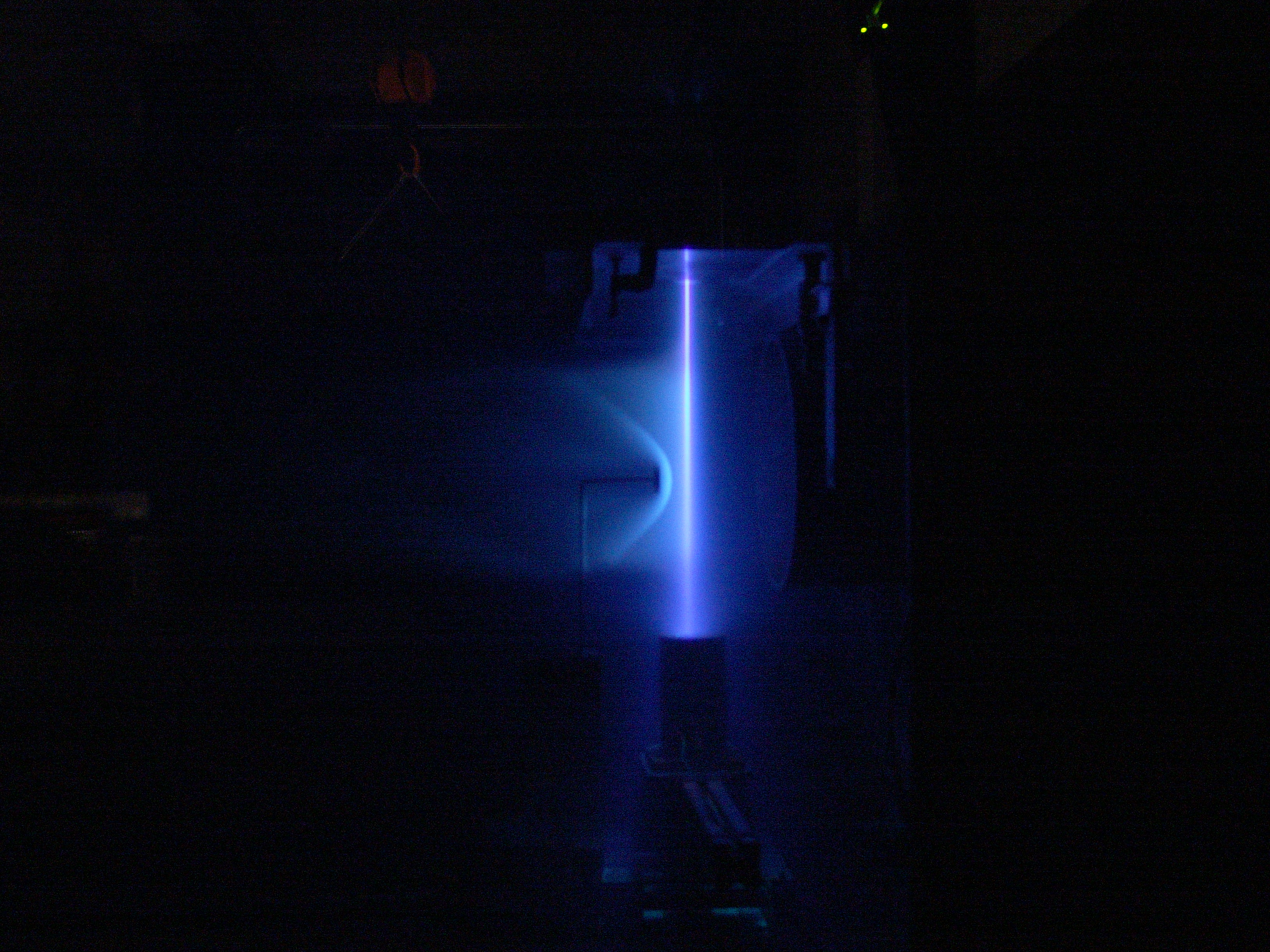
Photo of the experiment with an electron gun (ONERA).MARHy/ICARE (viviana Lago)

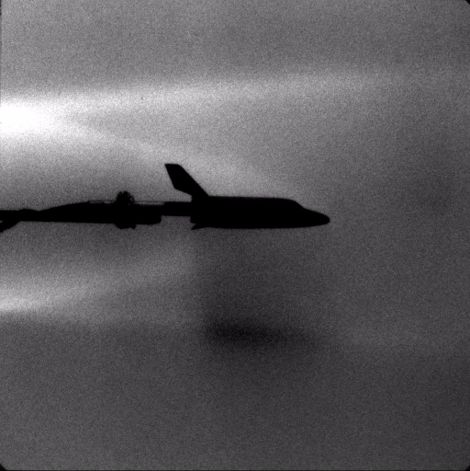
iCCD image of an Hermès model in a Mach 20 flow.MARHy/ICARE (viviana Lago)

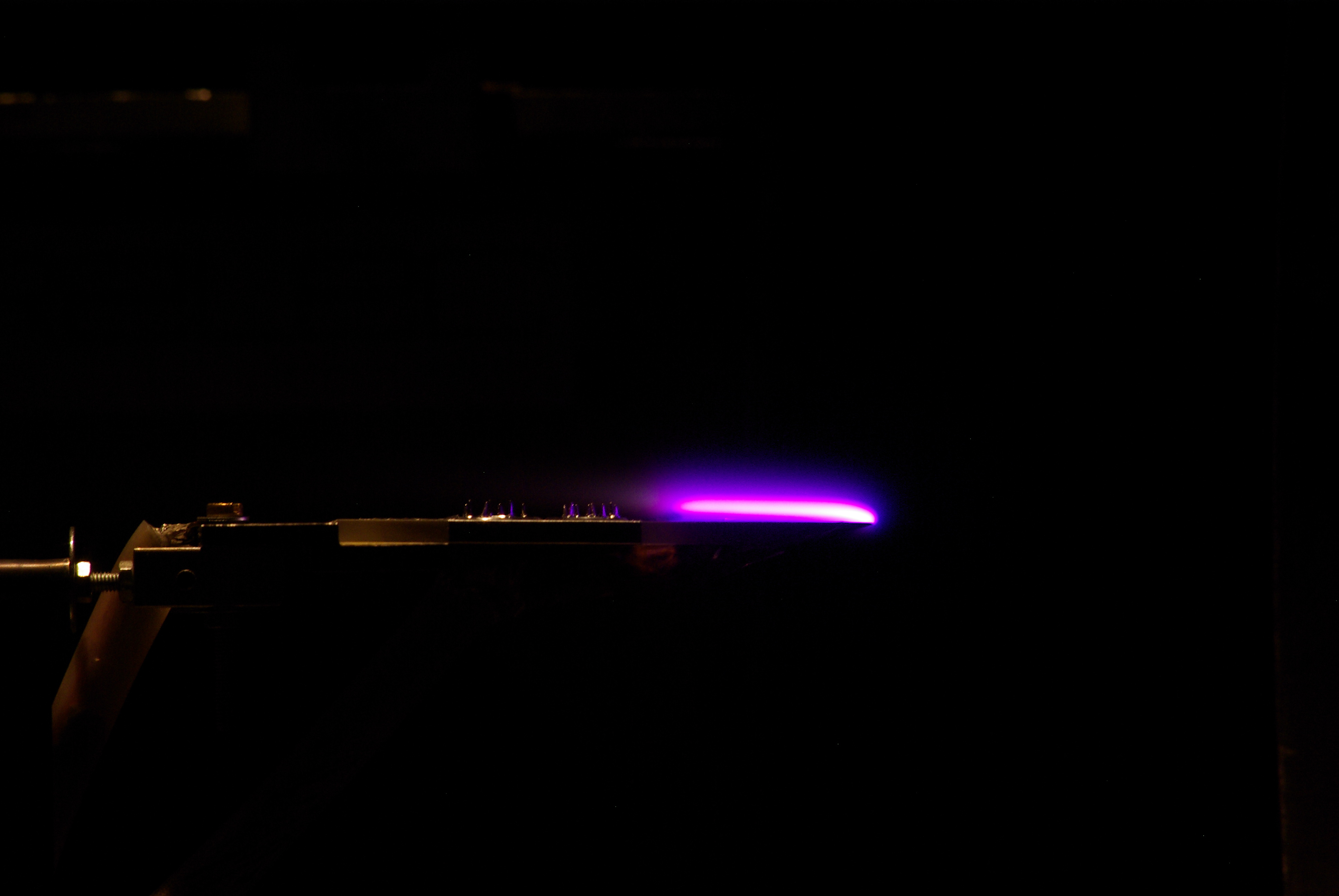
Photo of the glow discharge with a plasma actuator.MARHy/ICARE (viviana Lago)
