= Shock tube =

Instrument

For the pyrotechnic initiator, see Shock tube detonator

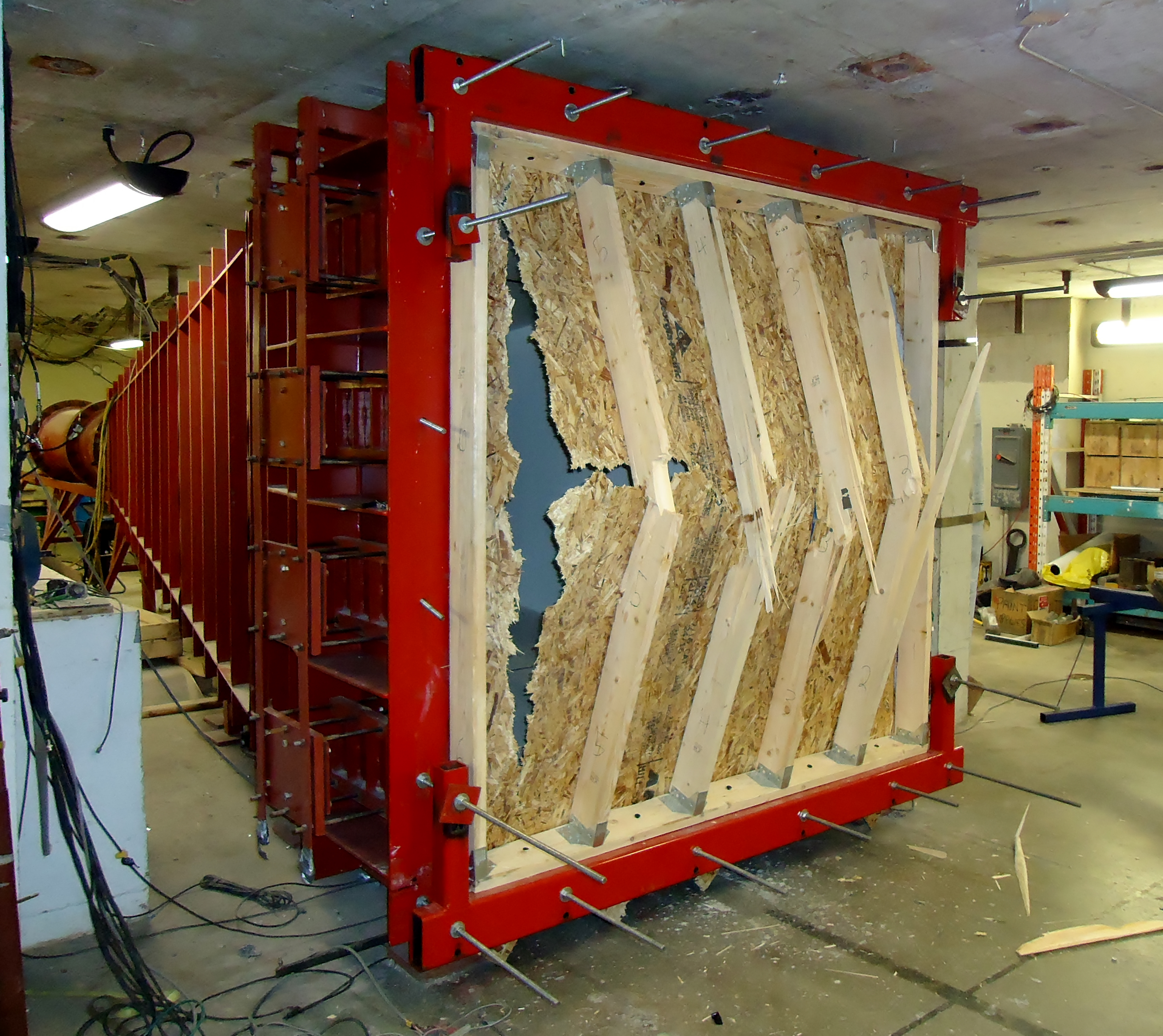
Shock tube test apparatus at the University of Ottawa, Canada.

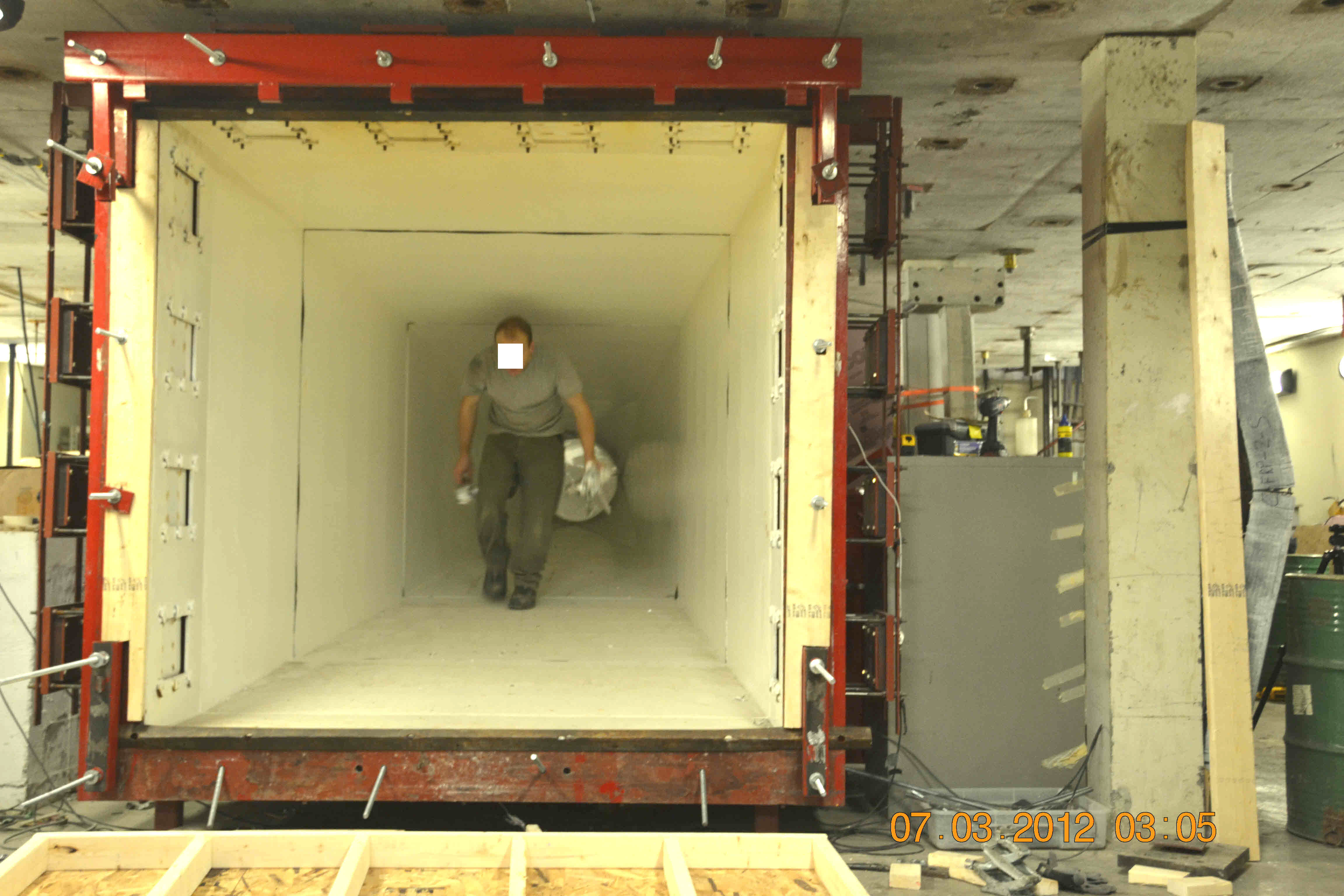
Remnants of spent aluminium foil being removed by a student.

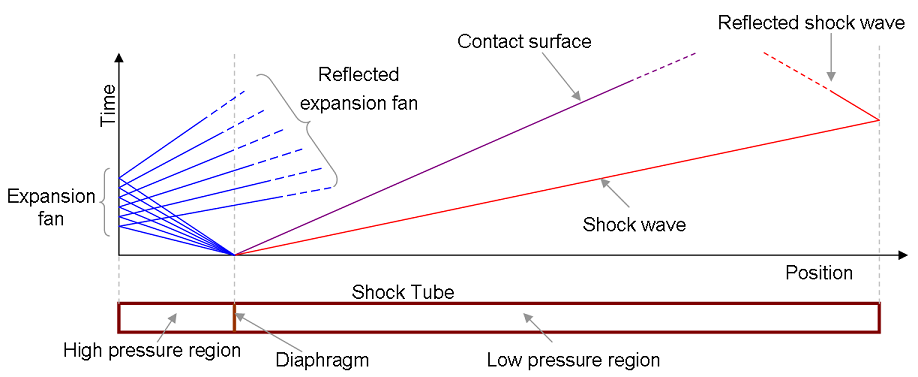
An idealized shock tube. The plot shows different waves which are formed in the tube once the diaphragm is ruptured.

A shock tube is an instrument used to create and direct shock waves at a sensor or model in order to study high speed flows such as explosions, usually on a smaller scale. Shock tubes (and related impulse facilities such as shock tunnels, expansion tubes, and expansion tunnels) can also be used to study aerodynamic flow under a wide range of temperatures and pressures that are difficult to obtain in other types of testing facilities. Shock tubes are also used to investigate compressible flow phenomena and gas phase combustion reactions. More recently, shock tubes have been used in biomedical research to study how biological specimens are affected by blast waves.

A shock wave inside a shock tube may be generated by a small explosion (blast-driven) or by the buildup of high pressures which cause diaphragm(s) to burst and a shock wave to propagate down the shock tube (compressed-gas driven).

== History ==
An early study of compression driven shock tubes was published in 1899 by French scientist Paul Vieille, though the apparatus was not called a shock tube until the 1940s. In the 1930s it was rediscovered by W. H. Payman and WCF Shepherd of English Safety in Mines Research Board in order to study underground methane explosions, but the term was not coined until Bleakney et al. publication of 1949.

In the 1940s, interest revived and shock tubes were increasingly used to study the flow of fast moving gases over objects, the chemistry and physical dynamics of gas phase combustion reactions. The modern version of the shock tube was developed during WWII at Princeton University by a group led by Walker Bleakney, who published overviews of their studies in 1946 and 1949.

In 1966, Duff and Blackwell described a type of shock tube driven by high explosives. These ranged in diameter from 0.6 to 2 m and in length from 3 m to 15 m. The tubes themselves were constructed of low-cost materials and produced shock waves with peak dynamic pressures of 7 MPa to 200 MPa and durations of a few hundred microseconds to several milliseconds.

Both compression-driven and blast-driven shock tubes are currently used for scientific as well as military applications. Compressed-gas driven shock tubes are more easily obtained and maintained in laboratory conditions; however, the shape of the pressure wave is different from a blast wave in some important respects and may not be suitable for some applications. Blast-driven shock tubes generate pressure waves that are more realistic to free-field blast waves. However, they require facilities and expert personnel for handling high explosives. Also, in addition to the initial pressure wave, a jet effect caused by the expansion of compressed gases (compression-driven) or production of rapidly expanding gases (blast-driven) follows and may transfer momentum to a sample after the blast wave has passed. More recently, laboratory scale shock tubes driven by fuel-air mixtures have been developed that produce realistic blast waves and can be operated in more ordinary laboratory facilities. Because the molar volume of gas is much less, the jet effect is a fraction of that for compressed-gas driven shock tubes. To date, the smaller size and lower peak pressures generated by these shock tubes make them most useful for preliminary, nondestructive testing of materials, validation of measurement equipment such as high speed pressure transducers, and for biomedical research as well as military applications.

== Operation ==
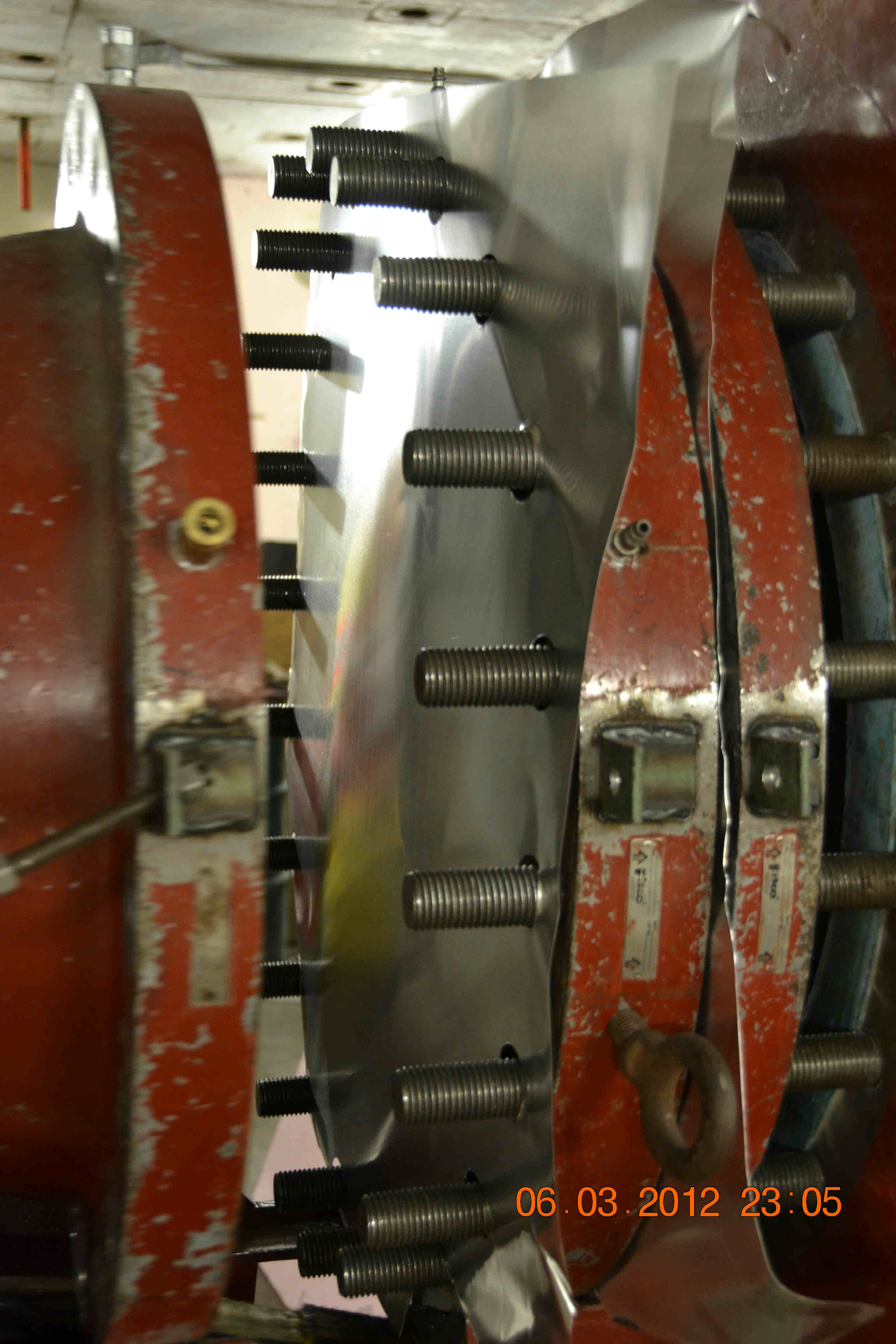
Aluminium foil used as a diaphragm between shock tube pipe segments.

A simple shock tube is a tube, rectangular or circular in cross-section, usually constructed of metal, in which a gas at low pressure and a gas at high pressure are separated using some form of diaphragm. See, for instance, texts by Soloukhin, Gaydon and Hurle, and Bradley. The diaphragm suddenly bursts open under predetermined conditions to produce a wave propagating through the low pressure section. The shock that eventually forms increases the temperature and pressure of the test gas and induces a flow in the direction of the shock wave. Observations can be made in the flow behind the incident front or take advantage of the longer testing times and vastly enhanced pressures and temperatures behind the reflected wave.

The low-pressure gas, referred to as the driven gas, is subjected to the shock wave. The high pressure gas is known as the driver gas. The corresponding sections of the tube are likewise called the driver and driven sections. The driver gas is usually chosen to have a low molecular weight, (e.g., helium or hydrogen) for safety reasons, with high speed of sound, but may be slightly diluted to 'tailor' interface conditions across the shock. To obtain the strongest shocks the pressure of the driven gas is well below atmospheric pressure (a partial vacuum is induced in the driven section before detonation).

The test begins with the bursting of the diaphragm. Several methods are commonly used to burst the diaphragm.

- A mechanically-driven plunger is sometimes used to pierce it or an explosive charge may be used to burst it.
- Another method is to use diaphragms of plastic or metals to define specific bursting pressures. Plastics are used for the lowest burst pressures, aluminum and copper for somewhat higher levels and mild steel and stainless steel for the highest burst pressures. These diaphragms are frequently scored in a cross-shaped pattern to a calibrated depth to ensure that they rupture evenly, contouring the petals so that the full section of the tube remains open during the test time.
- Yet another method of rupturing the diaphragm utilizes a mixture of combustible gases, with an initiator designed to produce a detonation within it, producing a sudden and sharp increase in what may or may not be a pressurized driver. This blast wave increases the temperature and pressure of the driven gas and induces a flow in the direction of the shock wave but at lower velocity than the lead wave.

The bursting diaphragm produces a series of pressure waves, each increasing the speed of sound behind them, so that they compress into a shock propagating through the driven gas. This shock wave increases the temperature and pressure of the driven gas and induces a flow in the direction of the shock wave but at lower velocity than the lead wave. Simultaneously, a rarefaction wave, often referred to as the Prandtl-Meyer wave, travels back in to the driver gas.

The interface, across which a limited degree of mixing occurs, separates driven and driver gases is referred to as the contact surface and follows, at a lower velocity, the lead wave.

A 'Chemical Shock Tube' involves separating driver and driven gases by a pair of diaphragms designed to fail after pre-determined delays with an end 'dump tank' of greatly increased cross-section. This allows an extreme rapid reduction (quench) in temperature of the heated gases.

== Uses ==
In addition to measurements of rates of chemical kinetics shock tubes have been used to measure dissociation energies and molecular relaxation rates they have been used in aerodynamic tests. The fluid flow in the driven gas can be used much as a wind tunnel, allowing higher temperatures and pressures therein replicating conditions in the turbine sections of jet engines. However, test times are limited to a few milliseconds, either by the arrival of the contact surface or the reflected shock wave.

They have been further developed into shock tunnels, with an added nozzle and dump tank. The resultant high temperature hypersonic flow can be used to simulate atmospheric re-entry of spacecraft or hypersonic craft, again with limited testing times.

Shock tubes have been developed in a wide range of sizes. The size and method of producing the shock wave determine the peak and duration of the pressure wave it produces. Thus, shock tubes can be used as a tool used to both create and direct blast waves at a sensor or an object in order to imitate actual explosions and the damage that they cause on a smaller scale, provided that such explosions do not involve elevated temperatures and shrapnel or flying debris. Results from shock tube experiments can be used to develop and validate numerical model of the response of a material or object to an ambient blast wave without shrapnel or flying debris. Shock tubes can be used to experimentally determine which materials and designs would be best suited to the job of attenuating ambient blast waves without shrapnel or flying debris. The results can then be incorporated into designs to protect structures and people that might be exposed to an ambient blast wave without shrapnel or flying debris. Shock tubes are also used in biomedical research to find out how biological tissues are affected by blast waves.

There are alternatives to the classical shock tube; for laboratory experiments at very high pressure, shock waves can also be created using high-intensity short-pulse lasers.

== See also ==
- Hypersonic wind tunnel
- Light-gas gun
- Ludwieg tube
- Expansion fan
- Shock tube detonator
- Shock wave
- Supersonic wind tunnel
