= Aerospace Testing Alliance =

Defunct aerospace engineering company based in the United States

- Type: Joint venture
- Industry: Aerospace engineering
- Founded: 2003
- Defunct: 2016
- Headquarters: Arnold Air Force Base, Tennessee, United States
- Products: Aerospace testing and engineering services
- Services: Operations and maintenance of aerospace test facilities
- Owners: Jacobs Sverdrup, General Physics, Computer Sciences Corporation, DynCorp

Aerospace Testing Alliance (ATA) is a defunct aerospace engineering company in the United States of America. It was the prime contractor of the US Air Force's Arnold Engineering Development Center (AEDC), in Tullahoma, Tennessee from 2003 until 2016.

Launched in 2003, ATA was a joint operation of Jacobs Sverdrup, General Physics, Computer Sciences Corporation (CSC), DynCorp. ATA was contracted at $2.7 Billion for a 12-year period.

The Center is now operated by National Aerospace Solutions.
