= Arnold Air Force Base =

US Air Force base near Tullahoma, Tennessee, United States

- Near Tullahoma, Tennessee in United States of America
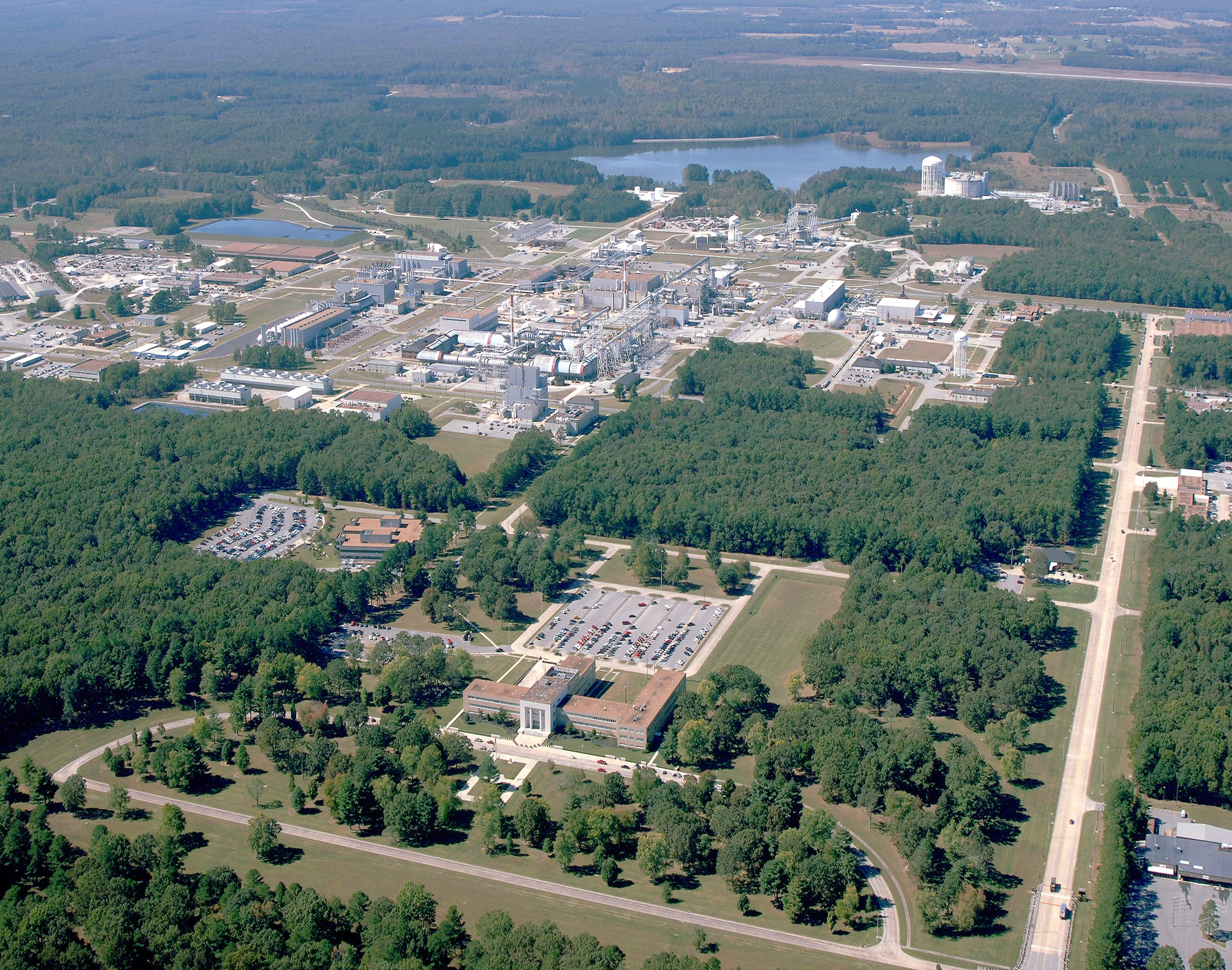
- Aerial view of Arnold Air Force Base in 2005

Site information
- Type: US Air Force base
- Owner: Department of Defense
- Operator: US Air Force
- Controlled by: Air Force Materiel Command
- Condition: Operational
- Website: www.arnold.af.mil

Location
- Shown in United States
- Coordinates: 35°23′33″N 086°05′09″W

Site history
- Built: 1950
- In use: 1950 – present

Garrison information
- Current commander: Colonel Jeffrey T. Geraghty
- Garrison: Arnold Engineering Development Center

Airfield information
- Identifiers: ICAO: KAYX, FAA LID: AYX
- Elevation: 325 metres (1,066 ft) AMSL
Runways
Direction	Length and surface
03/21	1,829 metres (6,001 ft) asphalt

Arnold Air Force Base (Arnold AFB) (ICAO: KAYX, FAA LID: AYX) is a United States Air Force base located in Coffee and Franklin counties, Tennessee, adjacent to the city of Tullahoma. It is named for General Henry "Hap" Arnold, the father of the U.S. Air Force.

The airfield was closed in 2009 but has since reopened. The first landing since 2009 took place in May 2023. Army aviation assets (helicopters) continue to utilize Arnold as part of missions supporting Fort Campbell, Kentucky or the Tennessee Army National Guard.

The base is home to the Arnold Engineering Development Complex (AEDC), the most advanced and largest complex of flight simulation test facilities in the world. The center operates 58 aerodynamic and propulsion wind tunnels, rocket and turbine engine test cells, space environmental chambers, arc heaters, ballistic ranges and other specialized units. AEDC is an Air Force Test Center organization.

The commander of Arnold Engineering Development Center is Col. Scott A. Cain, and Mark A. Mehalic is the executive director.

== History ==
=== World War II ===
Camp Forrest, located in Tullahoma, Tennessee, was constructed as one of the Army's largest training bases during the World War II period between 1941 and 1946. The camp, named after Confederate American Civil War cavalryman Nathan Bedford Forrest, was originally named Camp Peay. Camp Peay was named after 1920s Tennessee Governor Austin Peay and built east of Tullahoma as a National Guard Camp in 1926. Camp Peay covered 1,040 acres (4.2 km^{2}). Camp Forrest covered 85,000 acres (340 km^{2}) located just beyond the old Camp Peay.

The camp was a training area for infantry, artillery, engineer, and signal organizations. It also served as a hospital center and temporary encampment area for troops during maneuvers. Major General George S. Patton brought his 2nd Armored Division, "Hell on Wheels", from Fort Benning, Georgia, for maneuvers. Incoming troops were provided with amenities such as service clubs, guest houses, library, post exchanges, post office, hospital, religious services, theaters, showers, Red Cross, and Army emergency relief. Recreation facilities included swimming, archery, tennis, a sports arena and a 9-hole golf course.

William Northern Field, an air training base, was an addition for war preparation. The field was used as a training site for crews of multi-engined B-24 Liberator bombers of the Army Air Forces.

Camp Forrest officially became a Prisoner of War Camp on May 12, 1942. The camp received, housed, secured, and administrated Italian, Japanese and German POWs. Prisoners were processed as laborers at Camp Forrest, the hospitals, and in the local community on farms. In 1945, the US government implemented an Intellectual Diversion Program which would enlighten Germany on the American way of life and increase their appreciation for the United States. This program used educational and recreational media to change views of POWs. The program was successful with many prisoners.

Tullahoma was greatly affected by the installation of Camp Forrest. Because of maneuvers and operations, civilians became accustomed to blocked roads, traffic jams, crowded stores, the absence of mail delivery, and driving at night without lights. Soldiers camped out on lawns and fields. Many crops and fences were destroyed. In 1940, the population in Tullahoma was 4,500. By the end of the war the population had grown to 75,000. Many military people who moved in for construction and operation of the camp remained after the war.

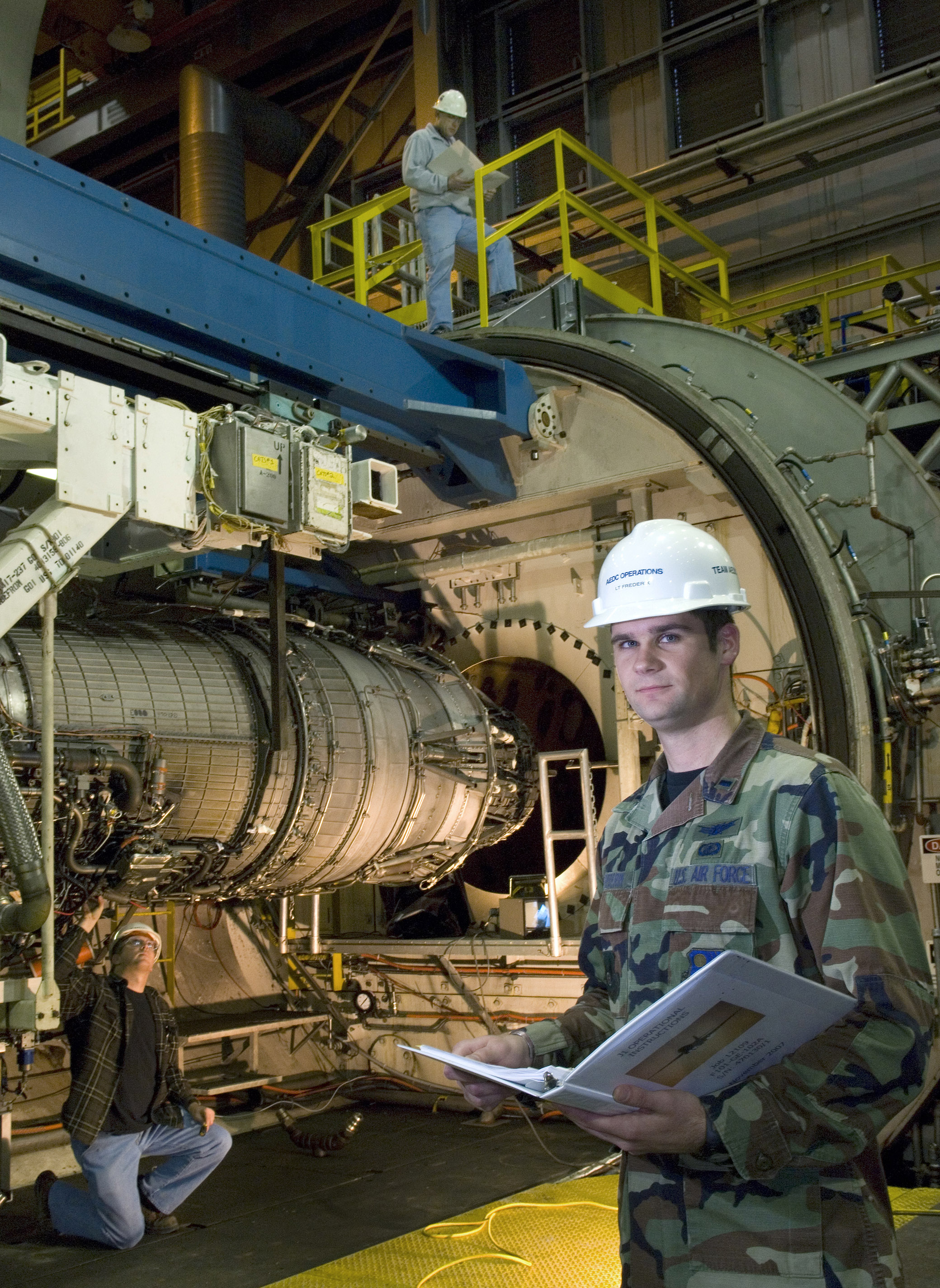
1st Lt. Josh Fredrick reviews maintenance checklists for a General Electric F101 engine at Arnold Engineering Development Center (AEDC), December 3, 2007. The engine is being used for the initial testing of a 50-50 mix of fuel produced by the Fischer–Tropsch process and traditional petroleum-based JP-8 jet fuel, a synthetic fuel mixture which is designed to reduce dependency on foreign oil.

=== Cold War ===
After the war, in 1946, Camp Forrest and Northern Field were declared surplus property. Buildings were sold at auction, torn down and carted away. Water, sewage and electrical systems were sold as salvage. All that remains are roads, brick chimneys and concrete foundations. Soon after the close of the camp, the area was selected for the site of an Air Engineering Development Center.

In 1949, Congress authorized $100 million for the construction of the Air Engineering Development Center. A site was selected for the new center at the Army's old Camp Forrest near Tullahoma and Manchester, Tennessee. The site was chosen for its abundance of land, water and power. Land was needed to buffer surrounding communities from potential test hazards and noise. Water was needed to cool rapidly flowing air and hot exhaust gases. Abundant electricity was needed to power huge testing systems. Construction on the center started in 1950. On June 25, 1951, a year after General Arnold's death, President Harry S. Truman dedicated the Air Engineering Development Center in Arnold's honor, naming it the Arnold Engineering Development Center.

One of the government's early decisions concerning the center was to employ a primarily contractor work force. The Arnold Research Organization (ARO) was formed by Sverdrup and Parcel to become that contractor work force. Part of the rationale was to maintain a stable work force that came to accumulate a volume of experience with the test facilities that were to be built. That idea would make the center a model for outsourcing for the Department of Defense by the 1990s. The 1950s saw the development of three major test facilities that remain active today — the Engine Test Facility, the von Karman Gas Dynamics Facility and the Propulsion Wind Tunnel Test Facility.

The first jet engine test equipment installed at the center was acquired from BMW in Munich, Germany. It took 58 railroad cars and two barges with another 450 tons by truck to move the equipment. After refurbishment, this equipment became the cornerstone for the Engine Test Facility, which was completed in 1953. By May 1954, the facility was put to work, testing the General Electric J-47 engine for the B-47 Stratojet bomber.

A flight dynamics facility for testing aerospace designs at high speeds was built and dedicated to Dr. Theodore von Kármán in 1959. Operations began with a prototype test cell called E-1, which was used to test the Falcon guided missile. Construction was completed on the Propulsion Wind Tunnel Test Facility at the end of the decade. PWT's huge wind tunnels have become hallmarks of the center and are perhaps the most heavily used facilities on base.

As the space race intensified, so did AEDC's workload. PWT was used to investigate configurations for the Mercury space capsule. The center was a key player in supporting Project Gemini, and the center played a multi-faceted role in supporting the Apollo Program. Apollo tests included aerodynamic assessments of the Apollo capsule and tests of Saturn V rocket upper stage engines.

Some new test facilities came on line to help turn numerous aerospace system ideas into reality. The J-4 Large Rocket Engine Test Facility was dedicated in 1964. PWT got an addition in 1968 when the 4-foot (1.2 m) Transonic Tunnel came on line, which is used largely to test store separations.

With several test facilities running at maximum, the pace of testing increased. Among the systems tested during the decade were the F-105 Thunderchief, C-141 Starlifter and C-5 Galaxy cargo planes, the E-3 Sentry, Airborne Warning and Control System (AWACS), the TF-39 engine for the C-5 and the upper-stage rocket motors for the Minuteman III Intercontinental Ballistic Missile. In the middle of the decade, the University of Tennessee and AEDC worked together in founding the University of Tennessee Space Institute. The institute became a place for AEDC engineers and scientists to further their education, and for students and professors to work on research projects to help AEDC.

There came a natural turndown in the pace of aerospace after the Moon landing and the end of the Vietnam War. Despite the turndown and a corresponding reduction by the government in funding for AEDC and the number of its employees, the pace of testing held steady as nearly 3,000 test projects were completed in the decade.

The list of systems tested during the decade read like a who's who of aerospace. Included on that list were the Space Transportation System, which would later be called the Space Shuttle, the F-15 Eagle, F-16 Fighting Falcon, B-1 Lancer bomber, A-10 Thunderbolt II, Pratt & Whitney F100 engine, MX missile, Sidewinder missile, Navy Tomahawk Cruise Missile, Air Force Air-Launched Cruise Missile and the Global Positioning Satellite.

AEDC developed Laser-Illuminated Photography during the decade to better study projectiles in the center's ballistic Range G that would be traveling up to 20,000 mph (32,000 km/h). The technique provided a photographic exposure equivalent to 20 billionths of a second.

A heritage for environmental stewardship and uniqueness was born in 1976 when the Department of the Interior registered AEDC as a unique natural area. The honor recognized AEDC's superior management of fish and wildlife resources, conservation practices and environmental achievement.

In a decade when the nation became energy conscious, AEDC helped to explore alternative energy sources. A 750-ton magnet was used as part of a magnetohydrodynamics research demonstration at the center, sponsored by the Department of Energy. The demonstration assessed the effectiveness of using a large MHD generator to boost coal's efficiency in producing electricity. AEDC later transferred the project to the University of Tennessee Space Institute.

The conflict in the Persian Gulf at the beginning of the 1990s became a defining event in late 20th Century America. It also showed the world what AEDC had been doing in the 1980s. As people around the world watched from their living rooms, people saw the US score victories in Desert Storm. They also saw the end product of what AEDC people had been working on throughout the decade. From the Patriot Air Defense Missile to the F-117A Nighthawk stealth fighter, AEDC people worked on every aerospace system deployed to the Persian Gulf. It was the first time technology showed up so dramatically in a real-world conflict, and it was a testament to the test and development work Arnold, von Karman and Wattendorf envisioned would be performed at AEDC.

The 1980s also marked the addition of the world's largest jet engine testing facility, the Aero-propulsion Systems Test Facility, to the center's aerospace flight simulation test facilities.

For the first time in the center's history, more than one major contractor performed work on base. The center's workload split into three contracts — support, propulsion testing and aerodynamics testing. In 1981, Pan Am World Services became the support contractor, Sverdrup Technology, Inc. took over propulsion testing and Calspan Corp. began aerodynamics testing. In 1985, Schneider Services International replaced Pan Am as support contractor.

=== Post-Cold War ===
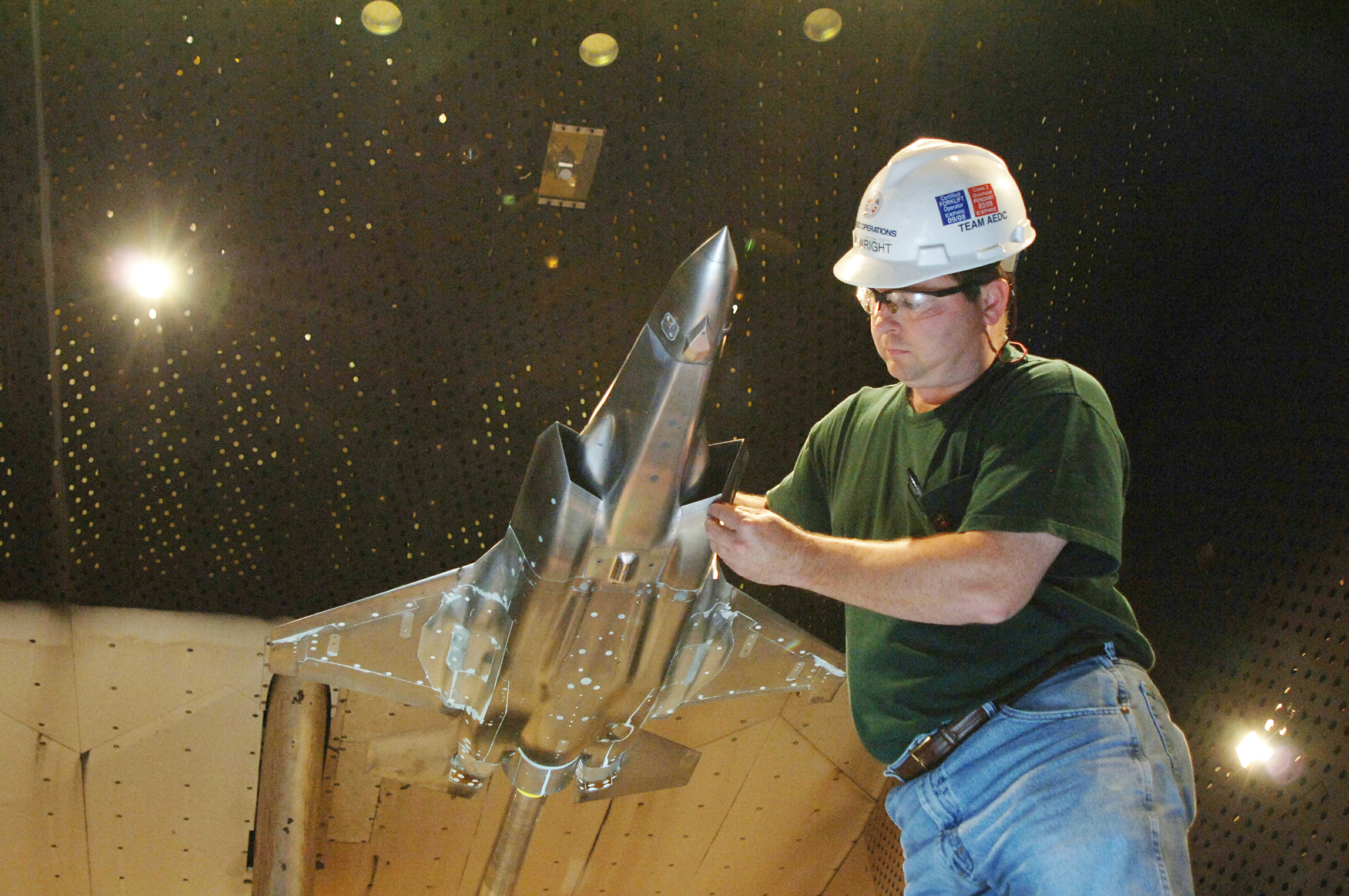
Tim Wright examines an F-35 Lightning II Joint Strike Fighter model in the AEDC's 16-foot transonic wind tunnel, December 2006.

The 1990s were a decade of change at AEDC. From opening its doors to commercial customers to "reengineering", the center's people explored better ways of doing business. Early in the decade, the center signed formal, long-term working alliances with several commercial aerospace organizations (Boeing, General Electric, Lockheed, McDonnell Douglas, Pratt & Whitney) to steady the workload and to offset dwindling defense budgets. That led to companies like Pratt & Whitney and Boeing bringing projects that were strictly commercial to AEDC.

AEDC leaders began to emphasize strategic management, meeting in focus groups to consider the long-term health of the center. An outgrowth was reengineering the center, an ongoing process that seeks to streamline operations and standardize maintenance processes. It was also a decade that saw the center break new ground on the computational front. Computational Fluid Dynamics, using computers to simulate flight, saw an increasing role in many major test programs. Using CFD and traditional ground testing together, helped hold down costs and provide more reliable data to test customers.

In 1998, the center was designated as one of the Department of Defense's High-Performance Computing Centers, making funding available to augment the center's supercomputing capability making AEDC the 9th largest computer center in DoD. The Navy docked at AEDC when its engine test facilities at Trenton NJ were transferred to AEDC as part of DoD consolidations under the Base Realignment and Closure Act. The move added four engine test facilities (SL-2, SL-3, T-11, T-12) and about 10 Navy personnel. The Air Force and Navy quickly integrated, making the center's vice commander and other slots Navy positions. In October 1997, AEDC assumed management for the former Navy Hypervelocity Wind Tunnel 9 in White Oak, Md.

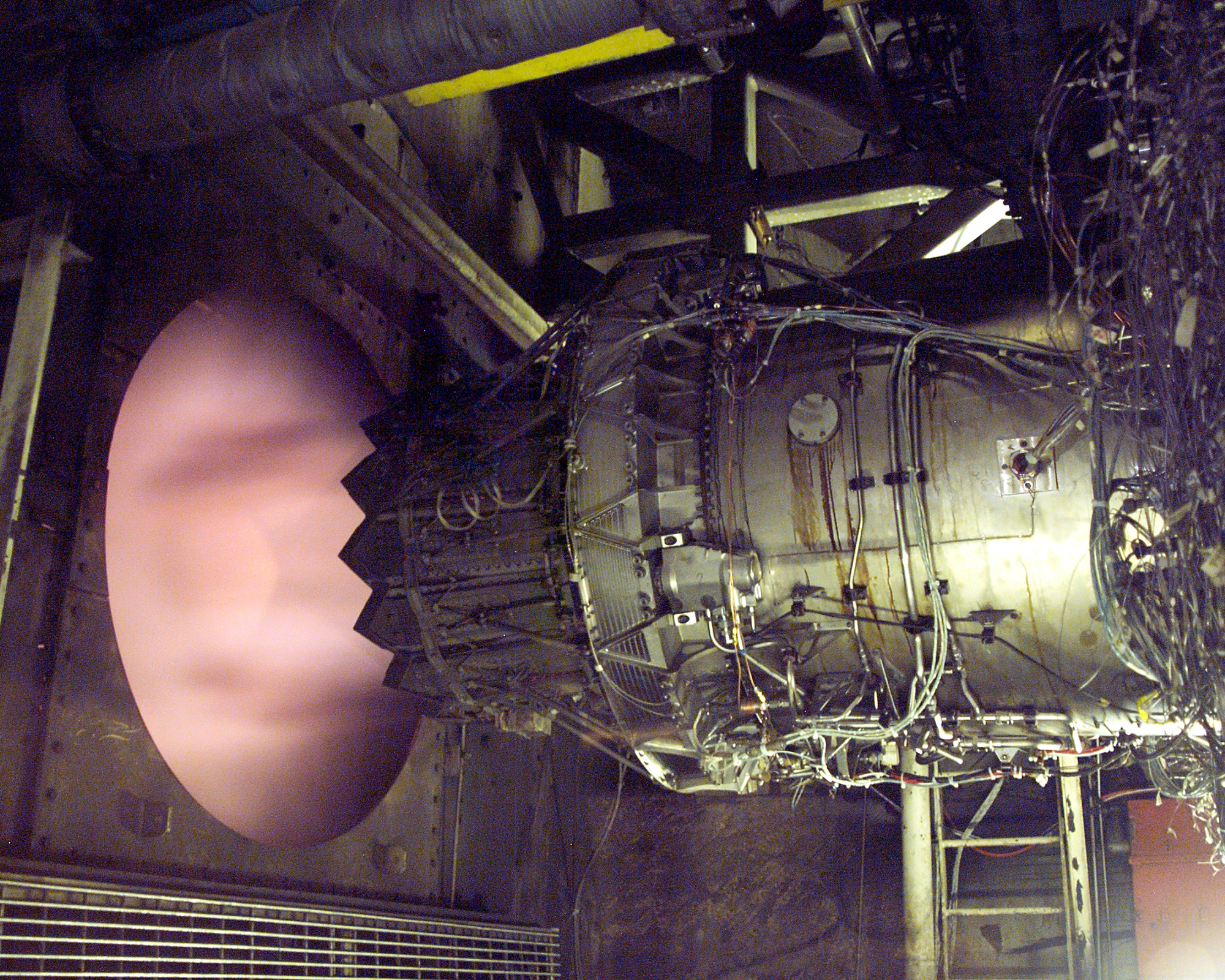
A Pratt & Whitney F135 engine undergoes altitude testing at the Arnold Engineering Development Complex in 2006.

Other facilities that came on line during the decade included J-6 — the world's largest solid rocket motor test facility — and DECADE, a nuclear weapons effects facility. Among facilities that saw significant modernization were the J-4 Liquid Rocket Engine Test Facility, the Aeropropulsion Test Unit and the Engine Test Facility. PWT also saw a major sustainment and modernization program begin. A number of major aerospace programs came to AEDC for testing, including the F-22 Raptor, the Joint Strike Fighter, the F/A-18E/F Super Hornet, the B-2 Spirit stealth bomber, the Pratt & Whitney 4000 series engines for the Boeing 777 and F-119 engines for the F-22 and Joint Strike Fighter, the Boeing 747 and 767 and the RL-10 rocket engine.

The center's workload consolidated to two divisions — test and support — in the mid-1990s, with Sverdrup as test support contractor and ACS as center support contractor. ACS is a joint venture of Computer Sciences Corp., DynCorp and General Physics.

In September 2002, a $10.4 million test facility upgrade was announced. When completed, the upgrade would make Arnold Engineering Development Center a "one-stop" shopping center for aerodynamic and propulsion test customers by providing Mach 8 capability. The Mach 8 milestone, which equates to objects traveling about 6,000 mph (9,700 km/h), comes as workers install a new high-temperature and high-pressure burner in the center's Aerodynamic and Propulsion Test Unit. This nearly doubles the center's current test capabilities of Mach 4.1 or nearly 3,100 mph (5,000 km/h).

AEDC test experts can run at Mach 8 for three to six minutes, which allows them to test an object across the full-duration mission profile. The project also calls for adding an improved air ejector system to allow the APTU to simulate higher altitude conditions while minimizing air usage. Installing the high-pressure air storage tanks and new liquid oxygen and isobutane systems are also included in the upgrade. Spring 2004 was the targeted completion date.

== Other information ==
Arnold Air Force Base has its own post office with zip code 37389. A wetland within Arnold Air Force is the only documented location of Gopher Frog in the state of Tennessee.

== See also ==
- List of United States Air Force installations
- Tennessee World War II Army Airfields
