= List of wind tunnels =

This is an alphabetical list of wind tunnels.

Name	Status	Size (W x H x L)	Use	Country	Comments
A2 Wind Tunnel		4 m × 94 m × 18 m (14 ft × 310 ft × 58 ft)	Full scale general purpose	United States	~$500/hr full scale race car, motorcycle, bicycle
ACE Climatic Wind Tunnel		6 m × 5.55 m × 14 m (20 ft × 18 ft × 46 ft)	Full scale: automotive, motorsport, cycling, skiing, architectural, transit, truck, product development	Canada	Available and accessible for all industries requiring wind tunnel services or climatic services
Aerodium Sigulda	Operational		Testing, training, open to the public	Latvia	First vertical wind tunnel in Eastern Europe
AeroDyn Wind Tunnel			Full scale NASCAR racecars	United States	
Aerodynamic and Propulsion Test Unit	Operational		Hypersonic	United States	Located at Arnold Air Force Base and operated by the United States Air Force
Aircraft Research Association	Operational	2.74 m × 2.44 m × 3.66 m (9 ft 0 in × 8 ft 0 in × 12 ft 0 in)	Transonic	United Kingdom	Transonic closed circuit, continuous flow wind tunnel. Mach number 0 - 1.4. Reynolds Number 3.5 to 16.7 million/m
Auto Research Center		2.3 m × 2.1 m (7 ft 7 in × 6 ft 11 in)	Subsonic research and development including: 50% scale model automotive rolling road, wind turbine design and optimization, and cycling	United States	Wind tunnel has a moving ground plane as well as primary and secondary boundary layer suction. Subsonic testing capabilities for motorsports, production cars, commercial semi-trucking, cycling, wind turbines, architecture, aerospace, academic research, and industrial research and development.
RUAG Automotive Wind Tunnel Emmen	Operational	2.45 m × 1.55 m × 3.8 m (8 ft 0 in × 5 ft 1 in × 12 ft 6 in)	Low speed automotive and general purpose	Switzerland	Belt system for rolling road simulation
Boeing Icing Wind Tunnel	Operational	1 m × 2 m (4 ft × 6 ft)		United States	
Boeing Low-speed Aero-Acoustic Facility	Operational			United States	
Boeing Polysonic (supersonic) Wind Tunnel	Operational	1 m × 1 m (4 ft × 4 ft)		United States	
Boeing Propulsion Wind Tunnel	Operational	2.75 m x 2.75 m (9 ft x 9 ft)	Low-speed, atmospheric, non-return, induction-type	United States	Typical models include engine inlets, exhaust nozzles, small engines or powered vehicles, aerodynamic half or full models, as well as thrust reversers.
Boeing Subsonic (low-speed) Wind Tunnel	Operational	6 m × 6 m (20 ft × 20 ft)		United States	
Boeing Transonic Wind Tunnel	Operational	2 m × 4 m (8 ft × 12 ft)		United States	
Boundary Layer and Subsonic Wind Tunnel	Operational	Boundary Layer Test Section: 2.8 m × 2.1 m × 30 m (9 ft 2 in × 6 ft 11 in × 98 ft 5 in) Subsonic Test Section: 2.1 m × 2.1 m × 4 m (6 ft 11 in × 6 ft 11 in × 13 ft 1 in)	Boundary Layer Development / Low-Speed / Subsonic / General Purpose	United States	
Building Research Establishment	Operational			United Kingdom	Two atmospheric boundary layer tunnels
Cal Poly's Low Speed Wind Tunnel		1 m × 1 m × 5 m (4 ft × 3 ft × 18 ft)	Low speed: Scale model testing, Aerospace, Automotive, IR industry	United States	Startups, major Aerospace corporations and other scientific equipment tested here. Rolling road implementation in progress.
Calspan Wind Tunnel	Operational	2 m × 2 m (8 ft × 8 ft)	Subsonic / Transonic	United States	The only independently owned and operated wind tunnel in the United States.
Central Aerohydrodynamic Institute: T-1		Diameter 3 m (10 ft) by 6 m (20 ft)		Russia	
Central Aerohydrodynamic Institute: T-2		Diameter 6 m (20 ft) by 14 m (46 ft)		Russia	
Central Aerohydrodynamic Institute: T-5		Diameter 2.25 m (7 ft 5 in) by 3.15 m (10 ft)		Russia	
Central Aerohydrodynamic Institute: T-101		24 m × 14 m × 24 m (79 ft × 46 ft × 79 ft)		Russia	
Central Aerohydrodynamic Institute: T-102		4 m × 2.33 m × 4 m (13 ft × 8 ft × 13 ft)		Russia	
Central Aerohydrodynamic Institute: T-103		4 m × 2.33 m × 3.8 m (13 ft × 8 ft × 12 ft) (elliptical)		Russia	
Central Aerohydrodynamic Institute: T-104		Diameter 7 m (23 ft)		Russia	
Central Aerohydrodynamic Institute: T-105		Diameter 4.5 m (15 ft) by 7.5 m (25 ft)	Vertical wind tunnel	Russia	
Central Aerohydrodynamic Institute: T-106		Diameter 2.7 m (8 ft 10 in) by 3.5 m (11 ft)		Russia	
Central Aerohydrodynamic Institute: T-107		Diameter 2.48 m (8 ft 2 in) by 4.85 m (16 ft)		Russia	
Central Aerohydrodynamic Institute: T-109		2.5 m × 2.5 m × 5.5 m (8 ft 2 in × 8 ft 2 in × 18 ft 1 in)		Russia	
Central Aerohydrodynamic Institute: T-112		.6 m × .6 m × 2.55 m (2 ft 0 in × 2 ft 0 in × 8 ft 4 in)		Russia	
Central Aerohydrodynamic Institute: T-113		.6 m × .6 m × 1.9 m (2 ft 0 in × 2 ft 0 in × 6 ft 3 in)		Russia	
Central Aerohydrodynamic Institute: T-113		.6 m × .6 m × 1.9 m (2 ft 0 in × 2 ft 0 in × 6 ft 3 in)		Russia	
Central Aerohydrodynamic Institute: T-116		1 m × 1 m × 2.35 m (3 ft 3 in × 3 ft 3 in × 7 ft 9 in)		Russia	
Central Aerohydrodynamic Institute: T-117		2.5 m × 2.4 m × 1.9 m (8 ft 2 in × 7 ft 10 in × 6 ft 3 in)		Russia	
Central Aerohydrodynamic Institute: T-124		1 m × 1 m × 4 m (3 ft 3 in × 3 ft 3 in × 13 ft 1 in)		Russia	
Central Aerohydrodynamic Institute: T-128		2.75 m × 2.75 m × 12 m (9 ft 0 in × 9 ft 0 in × 39 ft 4 in)		Russia	
City, University of London Transonic Wind Tunnel	Operational	0.91 m (3 ft 0 in) by 0.91 m (3 ft 0 in) by 3 m (9.8 ft); return: 5.7 m (19 ft) by 2.8 m (9 ft 2 in) by 18 m (59 ft)		United Kingdom	Mach 0.4 – 2.0; return max speed 12 m/s. Part of the UK National Wind Tunnel Facility
Cranfield University 8x4 Atmospheric Boundary Layer Wind Tunnel	Operational	2.4 m (7 ft 10 in) by 1.2 m (3 ft 11 in)		United Kingdom	
Cranfield University 8'x6' Low Speen Wind Tunnel	Operational	2.4 m (7 ft 10 in) by 1.8 m (5 ft 11 in)		United Kingdom	Part of the UK National Wind Tunnel Facility
Cranfield University Weybridge Wind Tunnel	Operational	1.067 m (3 ft 6.0 in) diameter jet		United Kingdom	
Cranfield University Icing Tunnel	Operational	0.76 m (2 ft 6 in) by 0.76 m (2 ft 6 in); 0.81 m (2 ft 8 in) octagonal; 0.4 m (1 ft 4 in) by 0.4 m (1 ft 4 in)		United Kingdom	Three test sections. Part of the UK National Wind Tunnel Facility
CRIACIV Boundary Layer Wind Tunnel - University of Florence	Operational	2.44 m × 1.6 m × 10 m (8 ft 0 in × 5 ft 3 in × 32 ft 10 in)	Building, bridges, general purpose	Italy	Closed circuit wind tunnel, T-shaped diffuser, one atmospheric test section (max speed 31 m/s [100 ft/s]).
Durham University 2m tunnel	Operational	2 m^{2} (22 sq ft)		United Kingdom	Subsonic; turbulence generation system; moving or fixed ground
Durham University 1m recirculating wind tunnel	Operational	0.3 m^{2} (3.2 sq ft): 0.55 m (1 ft 10 in) by 0.56 m (1 ft 10 in) by 2.44 m (8 ft 0 in)		United Kingdom	10 mph (4.5 m/s) – 100 mph (45 m/s)
Durham University – smaller tunnels	Operational	0.2 m^{2} (2.2 sq ft)		United Kingdom	Three tunnels; max speed 20 m/s
EDITH supersonic wind tunnel	Operational	Diameter 1.2 m (3 ft 11 in) by 1.7 m (5 ft 7 in)	Long shot time running (20 minutes).	France	Fundamental research on shock waves. Aerodynamic and aerothermal behaviour of probes and models. Fluidic thrust vectoring of supersonic nozzle
Energy Technology Centre	Operational	Working section 3.2 m (10 ft) by 3.2 m (10 ft)	Wind blade testing	United Kingdom	
European Transonic Wind Tunnel		2.4 m × 2 m × 9 m (7 ft 10 in × 6 ft 7 in × 29 ft 6 in)	Transonic	Germany	
Ferrari wind tunnel	Operational	70 m (230 ft) wide by 80 m (260 ft) long		Italy	
Focke's wind tunnel	Operational			Germany	Private laboratory of Henrich Focke, not discovered until 1977
Wright Brothers Wind Tunnel	Operational	4 m × 2 m × 5 m (12 ft × 7.75 ft × 18 ft)	Subsonic aerodynamic research, education, industry testing	United States	Located at the Massachusetts Institute of Technology in Cambridge, Massachusetts. Closed-circuit, closed-return atmospheric wind tunnel. Maximum speed 230 mph [370 km/h], turbulence level below 0.05%, reopened in 2021 after a complete rebuild.
Glenn L. Martin Wind Tunnel	Operational	3 m × 2 m (11.04 ft × 7.75 ft)	Low speed: scale model testing, automotive, aerospace	United States	University of Maryland, College Park
GVPM	Operational	14 m × 3.8 m × 36 m (46 ft × 12 ft × 118 ft) 4 m × 3.8 m × 4 m (13 ft × 12 ft × 13 ft)	Building, bridges, rail, aeronautical, general purpose	Italy	Vertically arranged closed circuit wind tunnel with two test sections: one atmospheric (max speed 16 m/s [52 ft/s]), one aeronautical (max speed 55 m/s [180 ft/s]) with possibility to test with open / closed jet.
Hypervelocity Wind Tunnel 9		Diameter 1.5 m (5 ft)		United States	Located at Arnold Air Force Base and operated by the United States Air Force
Imperial College London	Operational	Low speed tunnels: 0.4 m^{2} (4.3 sq ft) to 4.5 m^{2} (48 sq ft)		United Kingdom	Five low speed tunnels and other tunnels up to mach 9
Jules Verne climatic wind tunnel	Operational	6 m × 5 m × 12 m (20 ft × 16 ft × 39 ft) 10 m × 7 m × 20 m (33 ft × 23 ft × 66 ft) 4 m × 2.5 m × 20 m (13 ft × 8 ft × 66 ft)	Automotive, Rail, Full scale general purpose	France	Three test sections with wind speeds up to 280 km/h (170 mph)
Klebanoff–Saric Wind Tunnel	Operational	1.4 m × 14 m × 4.9 m (4 ft 7 in × 45 ft 11 in × 16 ft 1 in)		United States	
Large Amplitude Multi-Purpose (LAMP) Vertical Wind Tunnel Bihrle Applied Research	Operational	Diameter 3 m (10 ft)	Vertical, Subsonic, High AOA, Static or body-axis oscillatory	Germany	Privately owned wind tunnel. +- 180 degree AOA and +-90 degree sideslip. Diverse testing capability: static, wind body axis dynamic, Multi-body axis dynamic, simultaneous force moment and pressure data acquisition.
RUAG Large Wind Tunnel Emmen	Operational	7.0 m × 5.0 m × 15.0 m (23 ft × 16 ft × 49 ft)	Low speed aerospace, full scale automotive and general purpose	Switzerland	
Lockheed Martin Low Speed Wind Tunnel	Operational	8 m × 9 m × 19 m (26 ft × 30 ft × 63 ft) 7.0 m × 4.9 m × 13 m (23 ft × 16 ft × 43 ft)	Aeronautics, Full Scale Automotive, V/STOL Aircraft, General Purpose	United States	Larger test section was designed for use of V/STOL aircraft but is not limited to such. Max speed of ~320 km/h (200 mph) in smaller test section and ~160 km/h (100 mph) in the larger test section.
Loughborough University Aeronautical and Automotive Engineering Low Turbulence Windtunnel	Operational			United Kingdom	AAE Large Windtunnel
Loughborough University Aeronautical and Automotive Engineering Large Windtunnel	Operational			United Kingdom	
Loughborough University Automotive Wind Tunnel	Operational	1.92 m (6 ft 4 in) by 1.32 m (4 ft 4 in) by 3.6 m (12 ft)		United Kingdom	'Rolling road' moving ground plane. Part of the UK National Wind Tunnel Facility
MARHy wind Tunnel	Operational	Diameter 5 m (16 ft) by 2.5 m (8 ft 2 in)	Hypersonic/supersonic rarefied wind tunnel. No limit running time. Reynolds number /cm: 26.3 < Re < 7522;Mach number: 0.8 < Mach < 20	France	Fundamental and applied research of fluid dynamic phenomena in rarefied compressible flows. Aerodynamic and aerothermal behaviour of probes and models; Plasma flow control in rarefied and super/hypersonic flows.
Modine Wind Tunnels		2.7 m × 3.3 m × 12.2 m (8 ft 10 in × 10 ft 10 in × 40 ft 0 in) 4.2 m × 4.1 m × 14 m (14 ft × 13 ft × 46 ft)		United States	Climatic wind tunnel testing, large truck and automotive
NASA Ames 7-by 10 Foot Wind Tunnel		2 m × 3 m (7 ft × 10 ft)		United States	
NASA Ames Hypersonic Propulsion Integration 16 Inch Shock		Diameter 406 mm (16 in)	Hypersonic propulsion	United States	
NASA Ames Hypersonic Propulsion Integration Direct-Connect			Hypersonic propulsion	United States	
NASA Ames National Full Scale Aerodynamic Complex		12 m × 24 m (40 ft × 80 ft) 24 m × 37 m (80 ft × 120 ft)	Subsonic	United States	Largest wind tunnel in the world
NASA Ames Subsonic 12 Foot High-Rn Pressure		Diameter 4 m (12 ft)	Subsonic	United States	
NASA Ames 9-by 7-foot Supersonic Wind Tunnel		3 m × 2 m (9 ft × 7 ft)	Supersonic	United States	
NASA Ames 11-by 11-foot Transonic Wind Tunnel		3 m × 3 m (11 ft × 11 ft)	Transonic	United States	
NASA Ames Unitary Plan Wind Tunnel			Transonic/supersonic	United States	
NASA Glenn 10- by 10-Foot Abe Silverstein Supersonic Wind Tunnel		3 m × 3 m (10 ft × 10 ft)	Supersonic, Propulsion and Aero Capability	United States	
NASA Glenn 8- by 6-Foot Wind Tunnel		2 m × 2 m (8 ft × 6 ft)	Transonic	United States	
NASA Glenn 9- by 15-Foot Low-Speed Wind Tunnel		3 m × 5 m (9 ft × 15 ft)	Subsonic	United States	
NASA Glenn Aero-Acoustic Propulsion Laboratory Nozzle Acoustic Test Rig		Diameter 1,346 mm (53 in)	Acoustic testing of exhaust nozzles, subsonic	United States	Free-jet
NASA Glenn Engine Components Research Lab				United States	
NASA Glenn Hypersonic Test Facility			Hypersonic	United States	
NASA Glenn Icing Research Tunnel		3 m × 2 m × 6 m (9 ft × 6 ft × 20 ft)	Subsonic Icing	United States	
NASA Glenn Propulsion Systems Laboratory	Active	Diameter 7 m (24 ft) by 12 m (38 ft) long	Full-Scale Engine Testing	United States	Four test cells: 1 & 2 demolished; 3 & 4 active. Cell 3 has icing capabilities
NASA Langley 14- by 22-Foot Subsonic Tunnel		4 m × 7 m (14 ft × 22 ft)	Subsonic atmospheric	United States	
NASA Langley 20-Foot Vertical Spin Tunnel		Diameter 6 m (20 ft)	Subsonic vertical spin	United States	
NASA Langley Eight-Foot High Speed Tunnel-		Diameter 2 m (8 ft)	High speed	United States	
NASA Langley Full-Scale Wind Tunnel	Demolished	9 m × 18 m (30 ft × 60 ft)	Full-scale aircraft	United States	NASA's oldest operating wind tunnel until its closing in October 1995
NASA Langley High-Rn Transonic Dynamics Tunnel	Operational	5 m × 5 m (16 ft × 16 ft)	Aeroelasticity, high-risk testing, active controls, rotorcraft performance and stability, transonic aerodynamics.	United States	Unique capability to manipulate fluid-structure scaling parameters with use of Heavy-Gas (R-134a) or air as a test medium and variable pressure. Good flow quality for large transonic tunnel (Mach 0–1.2)
NASA Langley Hypersonic 20 Inch Mach 6 Air		Diameter 508 mm (20 in)	Hypersonic	United States	
NASA Langley Hypersonic 20 Inch Mach 6 Tetrafluoromethane	Demolished in 2016	Diameter 508 mm (20 in)	Hypersonic	United States	
NASA Langley Hypersonic 31 Inch Mach 10 Air		Diameter 787 mm (31 in)	Hypersonic	United States	
NASA Langley Hypersonic Propulsion Integration 15 Inch Mach 6 High-Temperature Tunnel		Diameter 381 mm (15 in)	Hypersonic	United States	
NASA Langley Hypersonic Propulsion Integration 8 Foot High-Temperature Tunnel		Diameter 2 m (8 ft)	Hypersonic, high-temperature	United States	
NASA Langley Hypersonic Propulsion Integration Arc-Heated Scramjet			Hypersonic	United States	
NASA Langley Hypersonic Propulsion Integration Combustion Scramjet			Hypersonic	United States	
NASA Langley Hypersonic Propulsion Integration Supersonic Combustion			Hypersonic	United States	
NASA Langley NASA / GASL HYPULSE Propulsion Integration				United States	
NASA Langley National Transonic Facility		2 m × 2 m (8.2 ft × 8.2 ft)	Transonic	United States	
NASA Langley Propeller Research Tunnel		Diameter 6 m (20 ft)	Full-scale aircraft used primarily in reducing drag caused by propellers and exposed engines	United States	
NASA Langley Subsonic 12 Foot Atmospheric Lab		Diameter 4 m (12 ft)	Subsonic atmospheric	United States	
NASA Langley Subsonic Low-Turbulence Pressure Tunnel			Subsonic low-turbulence	United States	
NASA Langley Supersonic High-Rn			Supersonic	United States	
NASA Langley Transonic 16 Foot Atmospheric		5 m (16 ft)	Transonic atmospheric	United States	
NASA Langley Variable Density Tunnel		Diameter 5 m (15 ft) by 11 m (34.5 ft) long	Measuring aerodynamic qualities of airfoils	United States	World's first variable density wind tunnel
National Wind Tunnel Facility	Operational			United Kingdom	Twenty-two wind tunnels at twelve universities allowing open access
ODTÜ-RÜZGEM	Operational	High Speed Test Section: 2.5 m × 2.5 m × 10 m (8 ft 2 in × 8 ft 2 in × 32 ft 10 in) Boundary Layer Test Section: 7 m × 3 m × 20 m (23 ft × 10 ft × 66 ft) Open Jet: 3 m (10 ft) equivalent diameter octagonal jet	Wind energy, aeronautics, civil engineering	Turkey	High Speed Test Section: Max speed 100 m/s [330 ft/s], TI<0.25% Boundary Layer Test Section: Max speed 30 m/s [98 ft/s] with spires and roughness elements Open Jet: Max speed 75 m/s (250 ft/s) Interchangeable modular test sections, 6x400 kW axial fan array, 750 kW heat exchanger
ONERA Modane S1MA wind tunnel	Operational	Diameter 8 m (26 ft) by 14 m (46 ft)	Subsonic atmospheric	France	Largest continuous blow-down wind tunnel in the world, Mach 0.05 to 1.
ONERA Modane S2MA wind tunnel	Operational		Supersonic	France	Continuous-flow wind tunnel, Variable pressure, Mach 0.1 to Mach 3.0.
PHEDRA (Arc-jet) high enthalpy wind tunnel	Operational	Diameter 4.5 m (15 ft) by 2.1 m (6 ft 11 in)	Supersonic high enthalpy rarefied wind tunnel. No limit running time . Averaged enthalpy, Mj/kg: few < Ho < 50; Mach number: 2 < Mach < 8;Working gas: N2, Air, CO2, CH4, Ar and extensive mixtures	France	Fundamental research of high enthalpy fluid dynamic phenomena in non-equilibrium flows. Aerodynamic and aerothermal behaviour of probes and models; Atmospheric entry research.
Poul la Cour Tunnel	Operational	3.0 m × 2.0 m (10 ft × 7 ft)	Airfoil aerodynamics and aeroacoustics, 10 to 105 m/s, Re~7M	Denmark	Named for Poul la Cour
Propulsion Wind Tunnel Facility	Operational	Transonic: 4.9 m (16 ft); Supersonic: 4.9 m (16 ft); Aerodynamic trasonic: 1.2 m (4 ft)		United States	Part of the Arnold Engineering Development Complex located at Arnold Air Force Base and operated by the United States Air Force
Rail Tec Arsenal Climatic Wind Tunnel	Operational	4.9 m × 5.9 m × 100 m (16 ft × 19 ft × 328 ft)	Full scale: transit, locomotive, automotive, propeller and turbines, airfoils and aircraft Icing-, solar-, precipitation tests all subsonic	Austria	RTA operates the longest climatic wind channel in the world. Whole trains up 100 m (330 ft) can be tested under real world conditions from −45 to 60 °C (−49 to 140 °F) and variable climatic conditions.
R J Mitchell Wind Tunnel	Operational	3.5 m × 2.4 m × 10.5 m (11 ft × 8 ft × 34 ft)		United Kingdom	Largest university owned wind tunnel in the United Kingdom, named for R. J. Mitchell
RWDI Wind Tunnels	Operational	7.32 m (24 ft) 3.66 m (12 ft)	Wind engineering, scale buildings	Canada	Two wind tunnels
San Diego Wind Tunnel		4 m × 2 m × 5 m (12 ft × 8 ft × 15 ft)		United States	Major airframers, bicycle manufacturers and professional athletes
T3 Hypersonic wind tunnel				Brazil	
Texas A&M Oran W. Nicks Low Speed Wind Tunnel		3 m × 2 m × 4 m (10 ft × 7 ft × 12 ft)	Scale aircraft, UAV, rocket, missile, academic research, automotive, motorsport, cycling, skiing, architectural, transit, truck, product development 0-200MPH	United States	
TitanX Jamestown Vehicle Climatic Wind Tunnel		3.0 m × 3.5 m (10 ft × 11 ft)	Climatic testing of vehicle systems and entire trucks	United States	Open for external clients
Trisonic Wind Tunnel		3,912 mm × 356 mm (154 in × 14 in)		United States	
Trudelturm		Height 20 m (66 ft)		Germany	
University of Bristol	Operational	Large Low Speed Wind Tunnel 2.1 m (6 ft 11 in) by 1.5 m (4 ft 11 in); Low Turbulence Wind Tunnel 0.8 m (2 ft 7 in) by 0.6 m (2 ft 0 in); Open Jet Wind Tunnel 1.1 m (3 ft 7 in) diameter		United Kingdom	
University of British Columbia Boundary Layer Wind Tunnel		2.5 m × 1.6 m × 23.6 m (8 ft 2 in × 5 ft 3 in × 77 ft 5 in)	Boundary layer, architectural, and wind-engineering studies	Canada	Speed range: 3 to 20 m/s (9.8 to 65.6 ft/s)
University of British Columbia Parkinson Wind Tunnel		1.0 m × 0.7 m × 2.6 m (3 ft 3 in × 2 ft 4 in × 8 ft 6 in)	Aeronautical research, studies of flow-induced oscillations, studies of wind tunnel blockage effects	Canada	Speed range: 5 to 35 m/s (16 to 115 ft/s)
University of Glasgow	Operational	De-Havilland Wind Tunnel 2.65 m (8 ft 8 in) by 2.04 m (6 ft 8 in); Handley-Page Wind Tunnel 2.13 m (7 ft 0 in) by 1.61 m (5 ft 3 in); Low Speed Wind Tunnel 1.15 m (3 ft 9 in) by 0.95 m (3 ft 1 in); Flow Visualisation Wind Tunnel 0.90 m (2 ft 11 in) by 0.90 m (2 ft 11 in)		United Kingdom	
University of Manchester	Operational	Hypersonic wind tunnel 6 in (150 mm) diameter Trisonic wind tunnel 0.15 m (5.9 in) by 0.3 m (1 ft 0 in); Open-circuit boundary layer tunnel 0.9 m (2 ft 11 in) by 0.9 m (2 ft 11 in) by 5 m (16 ft); Open-circuit wind tunnel 1.2 m (3 ft 11 in) by 0.9 m (2 ft 11 in) by 2 m (6 ft 7 in); Open-circuit wind tunnel 0.5 m (1 ft 8 in) by 0.5 m (1 ft 8 in) by 1 m (3 ft 3 in); Closed-circuit water tunnel 0.5 m (1 ft 8 in) by 0.5 m (1 ft 8 in) by 2 m (6 ft 7 in); Tilting flume 0.5 m (1 ft 8 in) by 0.3 m (1 ft 0 in) by 5 m (16 ft)		United Kingdom	Hypersonic wind tunnel: Mach 4, 5, 6; trisonic wind tunnel: Mach 0 to 0.8, 1.8
University of Southampton	Operational	3' x 2' tunnel 0.9 m (2 ft 11 in) by 0.6 m (2 ft 0 in) by 4.5 m (15 ft); 7' x 5' tunnel 2.1 m (6 ft 11 in) by 1.5 m (4 ft 11 in); R J Mitchell Wind Tunnel 3.5 m (11 ft) by 2.4 m (7 ft 10 in)		United Kingdom	
University of Southern Queensland Hypersonic Wind Tunnel	Operational	Ludwieg Tube 16 m long with 130mm honed internal tube	Hypersonic aerodynamics, free-flight aerodynamics, supersonic combustion, proximal body separation, heat transfer, hypersonic control, fluid-structure-interactions experiments.	Australia	Longest duration supersonic to hypersonic wind tunnel in Australia Mach 2 - Mach 7
University of Surrey	Operational	EnFlo Laboratory meteorological wind tunnel 3.5 m (11 ft) by 1.5 m (4 ft 11 in) by 20 m (66 ft)		United Kingdom	
University of Washington Aeronautical Laboratory, Kirsten Wind Tunnel		2 m × 4 m × 3 m (8 ft × 12 ft × 10 ft)	Subsonic	United States	
University of Washington Department of Aeronautics & Astronautics 3x3		1 m × 1 m × 2 m (3 ft × 3 ft × 8 ft)	Velocity range approx. 32 to 217 km/h (20 to 135 mph)	United States	The original "Boeing Aerodynamical Chamber", built in 1918 with an Eiffel 1.2 by 1.2 m (4 by 4 ft) and updated in the early 1990s with new power systems and a higher velocity EDL 0.91 by 0.91 m (3 by 3 ft)
Virginia Tech Stability Wind Tunnel		2 m × 2 m (6 ft × 6 ft)		United States	
Von Karman Gas Dynamics Facility	Operational			United States	Three tunnels at the Arnold Engineering Development Complex
Williams F1 Wind Tunnel 2	Operational	4.4 m × 2.5 m × 12 m (14 ft × 8 ft × 39 ft)	Motorsport / Automotive	United Kingdom	
WindShear Full Scale, Rolling Road, Automotive Wind Tunnel			Wind shear	United States	
Windtech Boundary Layer Wind Tunnel	Operational	3 m × 2 m × 23 m (10 ft × 7 ft × 75 ft)	Low-Speed / Boundary Layer Wind Tunnel	Australia	Windtech owns and operates one of the largest boundary layer wind tunnel labs in the world with a total of 3 wind tunnels under one roof. Each wind tunnel is 3 m × 2 m × 23 m (9.8 ft × 6.6 ft × 75.5 ft)
