= Aircraft Research Association =

- ARA Bedford
- Location within Bedfordshire

General information
- Type: Engineering research centre
- Architectural style: Wind tunnel
- Location: Bedford, MK41 7PF
- Coordinates: 52.156°N 0.474°W
- Elevation: 70 m (230 ft)
- Current tenants: ARA
- Construction started: September 1953
- Completed: April 1956
- Inaugurated: 4 May 1956
- Client: ARA

Design and construction
- Architects: Ley Colbeck and Partners

The Aircraft Research Association (ARA) is an aerodynamics research institute in the north-west of Bedford.

== History ==
Prior to the creation of the Aircraft Research Association (ARA), British aircraft companies were reliant upon either their own wind tunnel facilities, which were typically quite restrictive in scale, or being able to garner the support of the Ministry of Supply to conduct such testing. On 22 January 1952, the ARA was established with the aim of pursuing cooperation between the various firms of the aerospace sector. Its founders included 14 members of the Society of British Aerospace Companies, including Blackburn Aircraft, Avro, Rolls-Royce and Hawker Aircraft.

In 1953, it was proposed to establish the ARA's primary test location at Stevington, north-west of Bedford. By March 1953, the current site was chosen. On 7 September of that year, construction work commenced. Amongst other elements built as this time was the transonic wind tunnel; it was fabricated by Moreland Hayne of east London, and ran for the first time in April 1956. On 4 May 1956, the site was officially opened by Prince Philip, Duke of Edinburgh.

The ARA established an Experimental Aerodynamics department; it provides test data generated from wind tunnel operations, often to validate and complement computer-based analysis, on behalf of the various international clients of the Association, both of a civil and military nature.

The ARA also has a Design and Manufacturing department that undertakes the low volume production of scale models and associated equipment for both its own transonic wind tunnel (which has a maximum speed of Mach 1.4) as well as the low-speed, transonic, supersonic and hypersonic wind tunnels across the world. It has supplied models for both the European Transonic Wind Tunnel in Germany and NASA's National Transonic Facility in the United States, which are two of the largest cryogenic wind tunnel facilities in existence.

During the early 2010s, the ARA launched multiple efforts to modernise and enhance its capabilities so the association could be more competitive on the international wind tunnel test market; to this end, it investigated areas such as hybrid laminar flow control, aircraft load alleviation, powerplant integration, cavity aerodynamics and acoustics. It also upgraded its wind tunnel infrastructure, specifically the control systems for the transonic wind tunnel, drive system, acoustic measurement, and model manufacture computing and associated apparatus. As a part of these works, the ARA introduced a purpose-built gust generator that will perform studies into turbulence encounters, including at transonic speeds, to help clients optimise their aircraft design to be smoother and more efficient during flight. In 2019, ARA employed 150 technical staff at Bedford and 80 percent of its activities were for the export market.

== Research ==
The ARA provides aerodynamic design and consultancy services, ranging from theoretical exploration to physical experimentation and simulations, including Computational Fluid Dynamics.

More specifically, the Association has been involved in the development of numerous aircraft, both for civil and military operators. These include Concorde, multiple Airbus airliners, and every combat aircraft to have been flown by the Royal Air Force. Several aero engines, such as the Rolls-Royce RB211 turbofan, were also tested there. The ARA has also been active in the automotive and wind power sectors.

== See also ==
- Aerospace Technology Institute, in Bedfordshire, launched in 2012 by the government as the UK Aerodynamics Centre
- British Hydromechanics Research Association (BHRA), also in Bedfordshire
- UK Aerospace Research Consortium (UK-ARC), formed in 2018, an alliance of university departments
- List of wind tunnels
