= Márta Rencz =

Electrical Engineer

Prof. Márta Kerecsenné Rencz
- Born: July 24, 1950 (age 76); Budapest, Hungary
- Education: Budapest University of Technology and Economics M. Sc. in Electrical Engineering, (1973) D. Phil. in Microelectronics, (1980) Ph.D Thesis: Computer aided investigation of IC structures, (1995) Acad. Doct Thesis: Thermal modelling, measurement and simulation of IC packages
- Occupation: Electronics Engineer
- Awards: Harvey Rosten Award for Excellence in the Physical Design of Electronics (2000) Honorary Doctorate Tallinn University of Technology, Estonia (2013) ASME Allan Kraus Thermal Management Medal (2015)
- Honours: Doctor of Science Degree from the Hungarian Academy of Sciences (2005)

Dr. Márta Rencz is an Electrical Engineer. She is a faculty member and former Head of Department at the Budapest University of Technology and Economics and a member of the Hungarian Academy of Sciences.

== Career ==
She received an electrical engineering degree from the Technical University of Budapest, Hungary, in 1973. A Doctor of Philosophy in Microelectronics followed in 1980 with a Ph.D in 1995. She focused on microelectronic CAD development work in her early career including network and thermal simulation programs, the CELLIB cell library management program and the CELLINEX layout extractor program. Her later research interests have included the thermal investigation of ICs and MEMS, thermal sensors, thermal testing, thermal simulation, thermal model generation, electro-thermal.

Rencz was a co-founder of Microelectronics Research and Development group Ltd. (MicReD) in 1997, a spin-off company created by herself and fellow researchers, Vladimír Székely and Andras Poppe of the Department of Electron Devices at the Budapest University of Technology and Economics. Rencz and Szekely led MicReD to develop the Thermal Transient Tester measurement T3Ster™ equipment in 2000 as part of the EU PROFIT project. T3Ster is used for high precision thermal characterization of semiconductor chip packages and power electronics. MicReD was acquired by Flomerics Limited in 2005, a UK based electronics cooling company. Flomerics itself was acquired by Mentor Graphics Corporation in 2008 and MicReD is now part of its Mechanical Analysis Division.

She has published research results in over 350 peer-reviewed papers, the most cited being referenced over 200 times. She has been actively involved in many European consortia (including TALENT, PROFIT, SE2A, JEMSIP, THERMINATOR, PATENT, NANOPACK, NANOTHERM, SMARTPOWER) together with several educational initiatives while sitting on several industry committees including that for THERMINIC since its formation in 1995. From 2003 to 2009 she served as the secretary of EDAA.

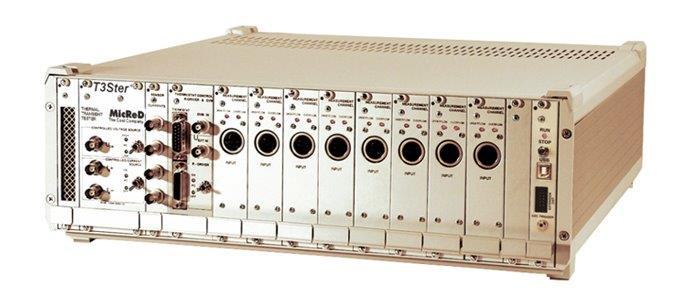
MicReD T3Ster Thermal Transient Tester

== Awards ==
She was the first woman to receive a doctorate honoris causa from the Tallinn University of Technology in 2013. She also received the ASME Allan Kraus Thermal Management Medal in 2015 for her contributions to the scientific and academic world of thermal transient testing, in particular, her work on thermal metrology including thermal test, characterization, and analysis of semiconductor devices and packages.
