= Vladimír Székely =

Hungarian physicist (1941–2020)

Prof. Vladimír Székely
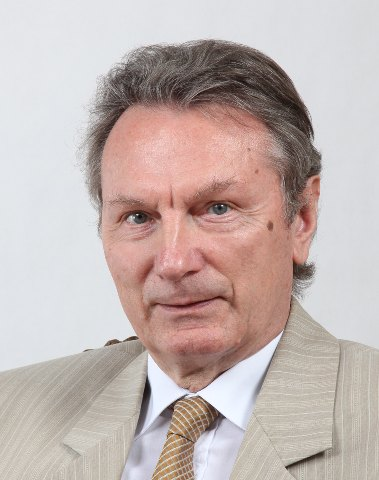
- Born: 11 January 1941; Budapest, Hungary
- Died: 13 November 2020 (aged 79); Budapest
- Education: Budapest University of Technology and Economics
- Occupation: Electronics Engineer
- Known for: Electro-thermal phenomena simulation and test
- Awards: Harvey Rosten Award for Excellence in the Physical Design of Electronics (2000) International Dennis Gabor Award (2010) Member of the Hungarian Academy of Sciences (2010)

Dr. Vladimír Székely (11 January 1941 – 13 November 2020) was a Hungarian electrical engineer, professor emeritus at the Budapest University of Technology and Economics and a corresponding member of the Hungarian Academy of Sciences. He was Head of Department of Electronic Devices at the Budapest University of Technology and Economics between 1990 and 2005. He published research results in 360 peer-reviewed papers listed in Web of Science, the most cited being referenced over 200 times, along with 12 books or book-chapters based on his theoretical and practical results.

== Academia ==
He received an electrical engineering degree from the Technical University of Budapest, in 1964 and joined the Department of Electron Devices in the same year. He completed a PhD in 1977 with a thesis entitled “Modelling of electro-thermal phenomena in ICs)”. He was Head of Department of Electron Devices at the Budapest University of Technology and Economics between 1990 and 2005, and later a professor emeritus at the same institution.

== Research ==
His first research area was the theory of Gunn devices. Later research interests were mainly in the area of computer aided design (CAD) of integrated circuits, with a particular emphasis on circuit simulation, thermal simulation, and device modelling. He oversaw the development of several CAD programs in the field of integrated circuit design and simulation with another area of technical interest being computer-graphics and image-processing.

He was engaged in the investigation of thermal properties of semiconductor devices and integrated circuits for the last 35 years. This resulted in the development of novel thermal based IC elements and thermal IC simulator programs. He pioneered and elaborated the mathematical method of calculating Structure Functions for thermal characterization of semiconductor packaging from thermal transient measurements. This non-destructive distributed resistor-capacitor network approach is used extensively today around the world by the electronics industry to diagnose the quality of thermal paths after becoming an IEEE JEDEC standard in 2010.

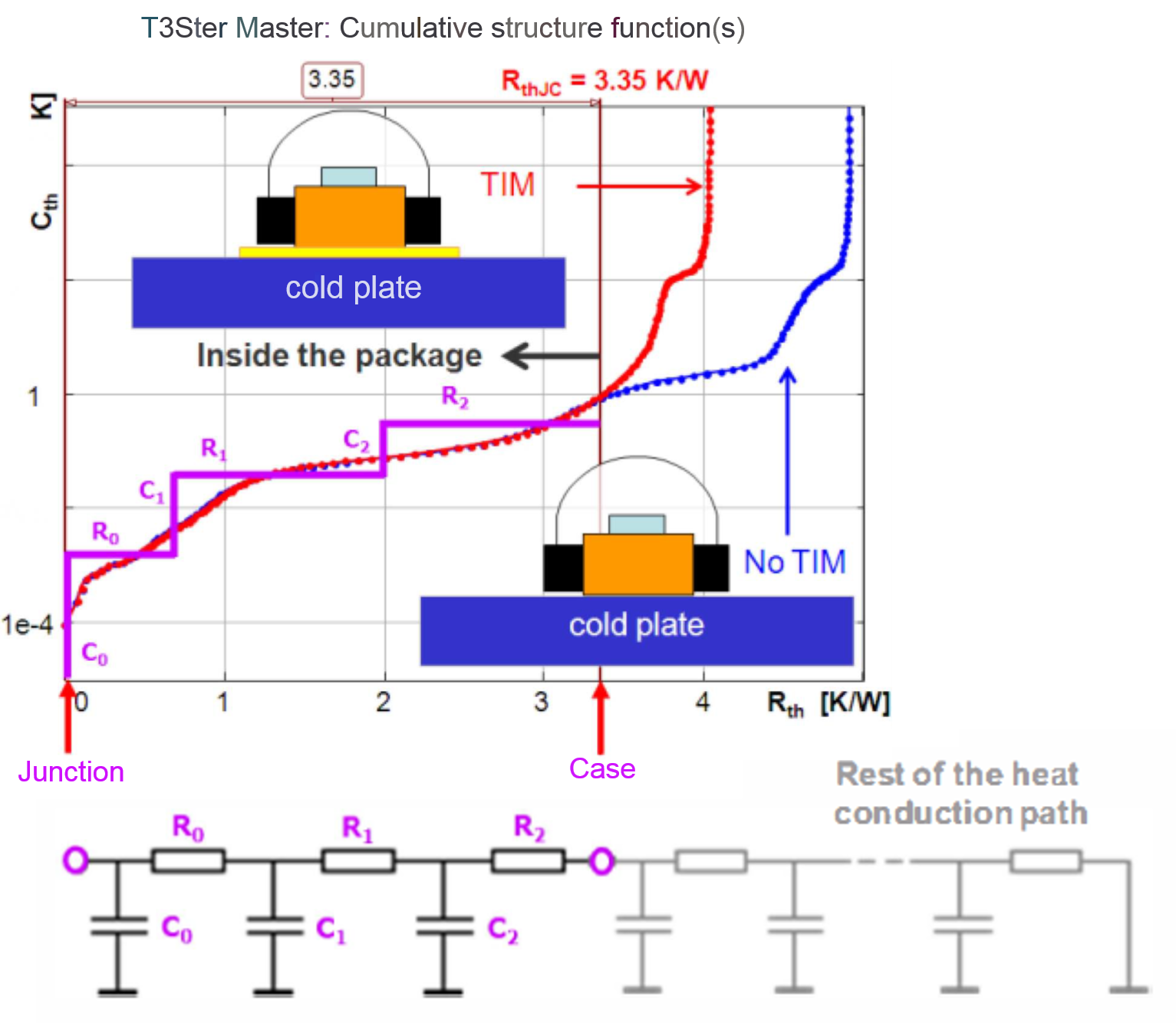
MicReD T3Ster Structure Functions of a package Rthjc thermal resistance for a power LED device with the transient dual interface method of JESD 51–14, and the dynamic compact thermal modeling of the main heat-flow path of the package.

== Commercial work ==
He was a co-founder of Microelectronics Research and Development group Ltd. (MicReD) in 1997, a spin-off company created by himself and fellow researchers, Prof. Márta Rencz, Dr András Poppe and Éva Nikodémusz (a development engineer) from the Department of Electron Devices at the Budapest University of Technology and Economics. Dr. Székely led MicReD to develop the T3Ster Thermal Transient Tester measurement equipment in 2000 as part of the EU PROFIT project. T3Ster is used for thermal characterization of semiconductor chip packages and power electronics and is a precision measurement device. MicReD was acquired by Flomerics Limited in 2005, a UK based electronics cooling company. Flomerics itself was acquired by Mentor Graphics Corporation in 2008 and MicReD is now part of its Mechanical Analysis Division.

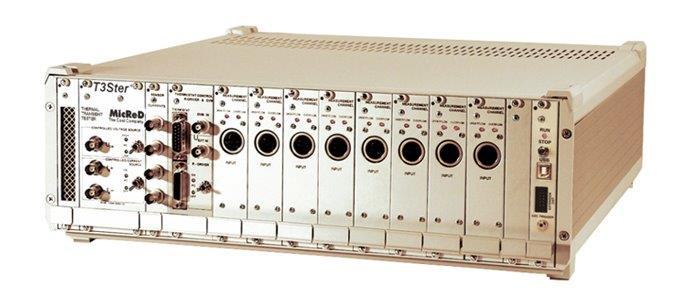
MicReD T3Ster Thermal Transient Tester

== Recognition ==
- Pollák–Virág Award (three times)
- 2000: the Harvey Rosten Award for Excellence in Physical Design of Electronics with Marta Rencz for their paper titled "Dynamic thermal multiport modeling of IC packages".
- 2002: Academy Award from the Hungarian Academy of Sciences
- 2006: Albert Szent-Györgyi Prize
- 2009: International Dennis Gabor Award
- April 2010: International Dennis Gabor Award for the development of T3Ster technology for thermal testing of semiconductor packaging
- 2010: Member of the Hungarian Academy of Sciences
