= NWTF =

NWTF may refer to:

- National Wild Turkey Federation
- National Wind Tunnel Facility
- Nigerian Women's Trust Fund
