= Eight-Foot High Speed Tunnel =

Facility at Langley Research Center

- Formerly listed on the U.S. National Register of Historic Places
- Former U.S. National Historic Landmark
- Virginia Landmarks Register
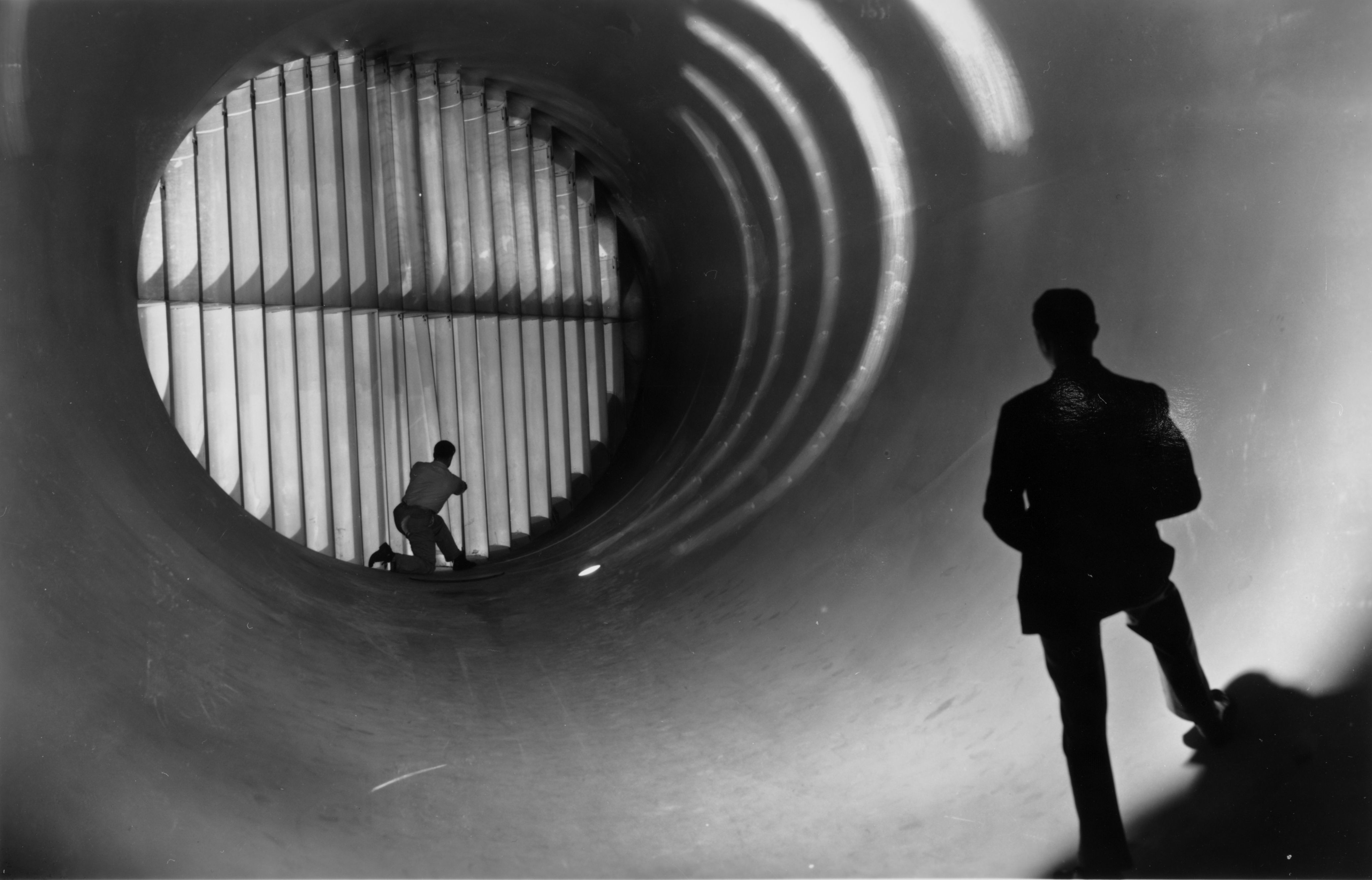
- The turning vanes of the Eight Foot High Speed Tunnel
- Location: Hampton, Virginia
- Coordinates: 37°4′49″N 76°20′29″W
- Built: 1936
- NRHP reference No.: 85002798
- VLR No.: 114-0139

Significant dates
- Added to NRHP: October 3, 1985
- Designated NHL: October 3, 1985
- Designated VLR: February 18, 1986
- Removed from NRHP: August 25, 2014
- Delisted NHL: August 25, 2014

The Eight-Foot High Speed Tunnel, also known as Eight-Foot Transonic Tunnel, was a wind tunnel located in Building 641 of NASA's Langley Research Center in Hampton, Virginia. It was a National Historic Landmark.

The tunnel was completed in 1936 at a cost of $36,266,000. Because of its high speed and Bernoulli's principle, the pressure in the test section is much lower than that in the rest of the tunnel. This required a structure that could withstand an inward force due to the pressure difference. Instead of steel construction, it was built from reinforced concrete with walls up to 1 ft (0.3 m) thick. This resulted in an "igloo-like" structure at the test section. The wind tunnel was designed as a single-return tunnel capable of moving air at speeds up to a Mach number up to 0.75. It was powered by an 8,000 hp (6,000 kW) electric motor. It was repowered to 16,000 hp (12,000 kW) to give Mach number 1 capability in 1945. In 1947, the speed was increased to a Mach number of 1.2 with the installation of a contoured nozzle. In 1950, a slotted-throat test section was installed, and it was repowered to 25,000 hp (19,000 kW).

Because it was the first continuous-flow high-speed tunnel, this tunnel was a landmark in wind tunnel design. This meant it could operate almost indefinitely to produce a high-speed airstream approaching the speed of sound. And it was large enough to accommodate large-scale models and even full-scale aircraft sections.

In 1950, the tunnel was the first in the world to be modified to incorporate a slotted throat design. This revolutionary design gave researchers their first accurate data on airframe performance in the transonic range. The tunnel was deactivated in 1956, when a new 8-foot (2.4 m) tunnel was built near it.

The wind tunnel was used for critical tests that validated the area rule for the design of supersonic aircraft. This said that the fuselage of the aircraft should narrow at the wings and expand at their trailing edges. This resulted in "wasp-waisted" aircraft.

The tunnel was taken out of service in 1956.

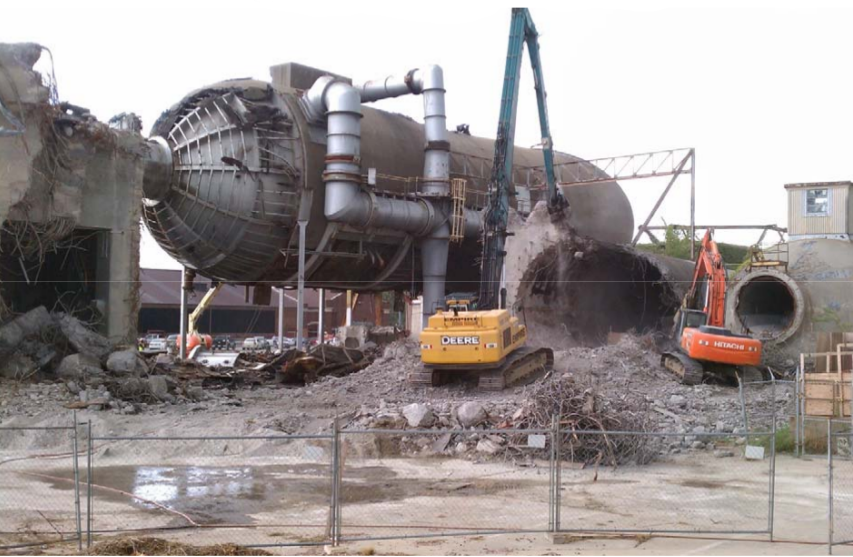
Destruction of Building 641 in 2011

It was declared a National Historic Landmark in 1985. In 2011, Building 641, which housed the tunnel, was demolished. The landmark designation was withdrawn in 2014, and it was removed from the National Register of Historic Places.

There are additional photographs of the wind tunnel in the Historic American Engineering Record collection.

== See also ==
- List of wind tunnels
