= Scientific and Technical Centre for Building =

French construction research agency

CSTB - Scientific and Technical Center for Building
- Creation: 1947
- HQ: France Marne la Vallée (France)
- Staff: 950
- President: Etienne Crépon
- Website: www.cstb.fr

The Centre Scientifique et Technique du Bâtiment (Scientific and Technical Center for Building) CSTB, is the French national organisation providing research and innovation, consultancy, testing, training and certification services in the construction industry. It was founded in 1947 after the Second World War to support the reconstruction effort.

The mission of the CSTB is to ensure the quality and safety of buildings, and support innovation from the idea to the market. It brings together multidisciplinary skills to develop and share essential scientific and technical knowledge, and to provide stakeholders with answers to the challenges of their professional practice.

The CSTB focuses on four key activities: research and consulting, assessment, certification and dissemination of knowledge. Its field of expertise covers construction products, buildings, and their integration into neighborhoods and cities.

== Test facilities ==
Their principal test facilities are as follows:

- The Jules Verne climatic wind tunnel in Nantes
- Atmospheric wind tunnels in Nantes for wind engineering studies
- The Vulcain fire testing furnace
- Aquasim, dedicated to sustainable water cycle management
- The Le Corbusier immersive room
- The Aria health laboratories
- The European laboratory of building acoustics
- The Semi-Virtual Laboratory for Multi-Energy System Assessment
- The Solar Process Test Laboratory in Sophia Antipolis
