= Falcon Framework =

Software application framework

The Falcon Framework (or the Falcon Framework for Concurrent Design) was Mentor Graphics' second generation software environment. Whereas their original environment had been Pascal-based and ran exclusively on the Apollo/Domain platform, the Falcon Framework was written in C++ and was portable to other platforms, notably Unix.

The Falcon Framework was marketed as a key technology for concurrent engineering in the EDA realm. However, it was better characterized as a software application framework. The key components of the Falcon Framework were:

- UIMS - The User Interface Management System. Later dubbed the CUI for the Common User Interface, this component was built on the X Window System and featured an OSF/Motif-like interface.
- AMPLE - Advanced Mentor Programming LanguagE or Advanced Multi-Purpose LanguagE. A C-Like scripting programming language.
- DSS - Decision Support System. A spreadsheet-like programming environment featuring a number of graphical widgets.
- DME - The Design Management Environment. A graphical tool known as The Design Manager for managing design components and The Registrar for editing the Falcon Frameworks registry.
- BOLD - An online documentation system. The primary application was the Bold Browser.
- EDDM - The Electronic Design Data Model. A connectivity-based data model for use with Mentor Graphics' IDEA Station suite of tools.
- DDMS - The Design Data Management System. The underlying component management system providing object facilities for managing references, persistence, and versioning.

Another key part of the Falcon Framework was the Open Door program. This program provided partners and customers with access to the software libraries and integration services. Open Door was an attempt to eliminate Mentor Graphics' reputation for proprietary products.

The Falcon Framework was the key feature of Mentor Graphics' 8.0 release and was initially released in 1991. Later developments included LMS (Library Management System) and iDM (integrated Design Manager). Subsequently, it has been ported to Windows NT.

A particularly eccentric feature introduced in the Falcon Framework was mouse gestures using the middle mouse button. For example an operator could delete a CAD symbol by highlighting it with a left mouse button click, then pressing and holding the middle mouse button and drawing a large "D" across the screen. The gesture would appear in red color on top of the drawing and window system and disappear and get interpreted once the user released the middle mouse button again.

Well Mouse gestures were present in the first generation software on Apollo Domain as well
