= Flowmaster Ltd. =

Software companies of the United Kingdom

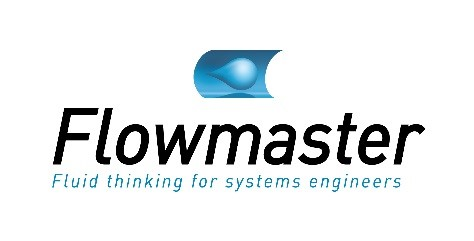
- Type: Private company
- Industry: Engineering Simulation Software
- Founded: 1992
- Headquarters: United Kingdom
- Products: Flowmaster ® (now sold as FloMASTER)
- Parent: Mentor Graphics Corporation
- Website: www.mentor.com/FloMASTER

Flowmaster Ltd. was a leading British Engineering Simulation Software company based in Milton Keynes, UK. Its flagship 1D CFD product, also named ‘Flowmaster’, was first released commercially in 1987 although initial versions went back to the early 1980s having originated from BHRA, the not-for-profit British Hydromechanics Research Association, later to become the BHR Group.

Flowmaster 1D thermo-fluid systems simulation software employed a matrix type solver and was the first tool of its type onto the market. It was initially sold and marketed by Amazon Computers Ltd based in Milton Keynes, UK. The software covered many different industries such as aerospace, automotive, marine, oil and gas, power generation, process, rail and water.

Flowmaster software itself was based on extensive experimental validation data from D. S. Miller’s internationally respected scientific textbook, ‘Internal Flow Systems’, first published in 1978.

A company called Flowmaster International (that later became Flowmaster Ltd) was created in 1992 when Richard Tickle was appointed CEO. During the next ten years Flowmaster experienced significant growth opening international sales offices near Frankfurt, Germany and Chicago, USA. Richard was followed as CEO by Alan Berry who led the company up to its acquisition in 2012 by Mentor Graphics Corporation where it became part of Mentor’s Mechanical Analysis Division.

The Flowmaster product has subsequently been renamed as FloMASTER by Mentor Graphics in 2016 for its V8 release. Following the acquisition by Siemens Digital Industries in 2017, FloMASTER became part of the Siemens Digital Industries Software offering. Now part of Simulation and Test, FloMASTER goes to market as Simcenter Flomaster.

== History ==
Development work first commenced on a commercial computer code that would become ‘Flowmaster’ in the period between 1980 and 1984 based on the extensive BHRA research data from Don Miller’s ‘Internal Flow Systems’ for pipework and ducting. Flowmaster V1.0 was subsequently released commercially in 1987. It was the first general purpose 1D CFD flow solver, having ‘pick and drop’ components and an interactive user interface with “joystick” control; all innovations for their time. Its first customer was Vickers Shipbuilding and Engineering Ltd. in the UK. By 2002, the 1,000th commercial license of Flowmaster was purchased by Tokyo Gas Company Ltd.

Flowmaster V1 was released in 1987.

Flowmaster V2 was released in 1990.

Flowmaster V3 was released in 1993.

Flowmaster V4 was released in 1995.

Flowmaster V5 was released in 1997.

Flowmaster V6 was released in 1999.

Flowmaster V7 was released in 2007.

FloMASTER (Flowmaster) V8 was released in 2016.

Flowmaster helped to pioneer software for virtual hybrid electric vehicles with its integration into the USA-based NREL ‘ADVISOR’ program that sought to simulate a complete vehicle cooling system in 2000. This idea has evolved into the concept of “digital twins” which today is a major driving force in many industries.

Flowmaster has been added to over the years including the application of the Method of Characteristics to compressible pipe flow systems, a new approach to the modeling of AC components, the first commercial co-simulation link between 1D and 3D CFD software and control models were added in 1999. Industry specific variants of Flowmaster for Automotive, Aerospace, Power and Energy and Gas Turbines and were released from 2007 – 2016.

After Flowmaster Ltd was acquired by Mentor Graphics Corporation in 2012 the software has been enhanced numerically and upgraded such that FloMASTER V8 was launched in December 2016 with Organic Rankine Cycle enhancements for Waste Heat Recovery predictions, a new user interface ‘Launchpad’ experience, plus a new integrated 1D-3D CFD workflow that allows for accelerated Simulation Based Characterization (SBC) of multi-arm 3D components inside the 1D systems simulation environment.

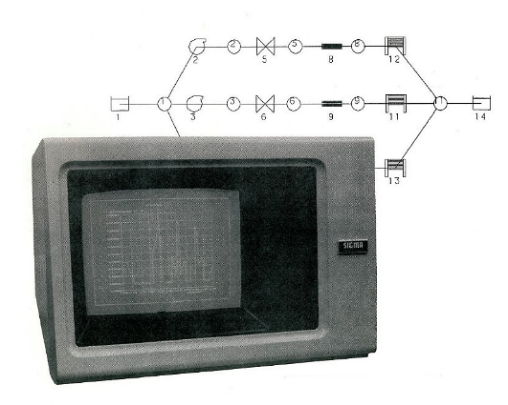
Version of Flowmaster™ from the early 1980s

== Product ==
Flowmaster is a general purpose 1D computational fluid dynamics (CFD) code for modeling and analysis of fluid mechanics in complex piping and ducting systems of any scale. It is a thermo-fluid systems engineering package that has the ability to simulate flows of gases and liquids, heat and mass transfer, moving bodies, two-phase flows and fluid-structure interaction (FSI) through computational modeling algorithms. It uses a Method of Characteristics solver that allows it to handle accurately fluid transients in complex systems and systems-of-systems such as pressure surge and ‘water hammer’. It also has an advanced gas turbine secondary air modeling capability.

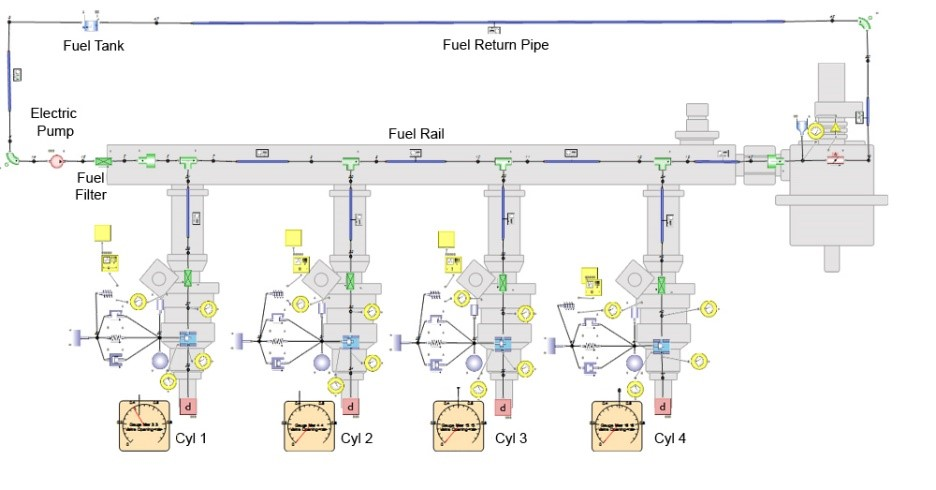
Typical FloMASTER 1D thermo-fluid automotive engine fuel injection system

== Technology ==
FloMASTER simulates 1D thermo-fluid systems and complex systems-of-systems through:

Empirical Data: The code is underpinned by D.S. Miller’s 'Internal Flow Systems' component and fluids data plus Wylie and Streeter’s 'Fluid Transients in Systems' that both allow for simulations to be initiated before detailed design information exists. The 1D model can then evolve according to the user’s requirements.

Solver: Steady state analysis for pressure drop, flow and heat balance calculations to the same model can then be used for dynamic simulations such as pressure surge and water hammer behavior. The solver has embedded ‘parametrics’ for design iterations, and a SQL relational database to store and track all models, results, and performance data.

Integration: Open APIs allow for the direct integration with product development tools and systems, including optimization codes, MATLAB and other CAE codes.

Software Development Kit (SDK): A suite of tools that enable FloMASTER to be integrated with product development tools and systems, including optimization tools such as Optimus, Control Modeling tools such as Simulink and other CAE tools. Integration is facilitated through an open API which supports COM and .NET as well as through an embedded script editor which allows creation of native macros, scripts and plug-ins.

1D-3D CFD: Model-Based Design (MBD) and Simulation-Based Characterization (SBC) features that allow for modeling of components for which data is either difficult to obtain, or non-existent in a 1D sense, to be created. Examples include multi-arm junctions and non-standard ducts and bends. The SBC approach leads to a virtual ‘flow test bench’ inside the Mentor Graphics FloEFD 3D CFD tool to extend the FloMASTER component catalog.

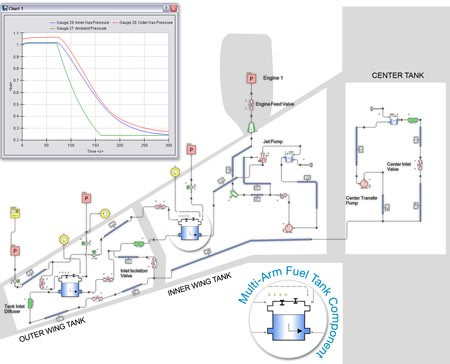
FloMASTER™ 1D thermo-fluid system network for an Aircraft Fuel Tank

== See also ==
- Internal Flow Systems
- Don Miller
- Waste Heat Recovery
- Model-Based Design
- Computational Fluid Dynamics
