= Ferrari factory =

Manufacturing facility

The addition to the Ferrari compound at Maranello was designed in 2006 by Ateliers Jean Nouvel, the Paris-based architecture firm, and constructed in 2009. Additions included a new assembly facility, showrooms, offices and retail space, which are unified under a large, louvered roof.

The additions project is located in the historical part of the compound. While the existing buildings remain for the most part untouched, their facades are clad in reflective red panels wherever the new building borders onto them. Additionally, the existing facade of the Ferrari historical factory is clad in reflective red steel sheets. The principal materials that are used for the exterior of the new buildings are stainless steel with a mirror finish, glass, and painted red steel panels. The glass modules are composed of a reflective glass to approximate the mirrored steel, as well as to control solar penetration.

The large, louvered roof is made of mirrored stainless steel sheets that are positioned at an angle relative to the roof plane reflect light and images of the sky to the spaces beneath. Some of the louvers also have images and logos printed on their upper face, which are reflected into the interiors of the buildings.

A series of gardens are located within and around the buildings of the compound. These are intended as spaces for circulation and recreation.

A number of other new buildings by notable architects have been added to the compound in recent years, such as the Ferrari wind tunnel, designed by Renzo Piano and an office building designed by Massimiliano Fuksas.
