= Klebanoff–Saric Wind Tunnel =

Wind tunnel located at Texas A&M University

The Klebanoff–Saric Wind Tunnel (KSWT) is a low-speed, low-disturbance wind tunnel located at Texas A&M University. This facility is mainly used to study laminar-turbulent boundary layer transition by means of flat-plate and swept-wing experiments. Measurement techniques used include hotwire anemometry, infrared thermography, and naphthalene flow visualization.

== History ==
Originally built by Dr. Phillip Klebanoff in 1970 at the National Bureau of Standards in Maryland, this tunnel was later moved by Dr. William Saric to Arizona State University in 1984, and it was then moved by Saric to Texas A&M University in 2005.
