= R J Mitchell Wind Tunnel =

R. J. Mitchell Wind Tunnel
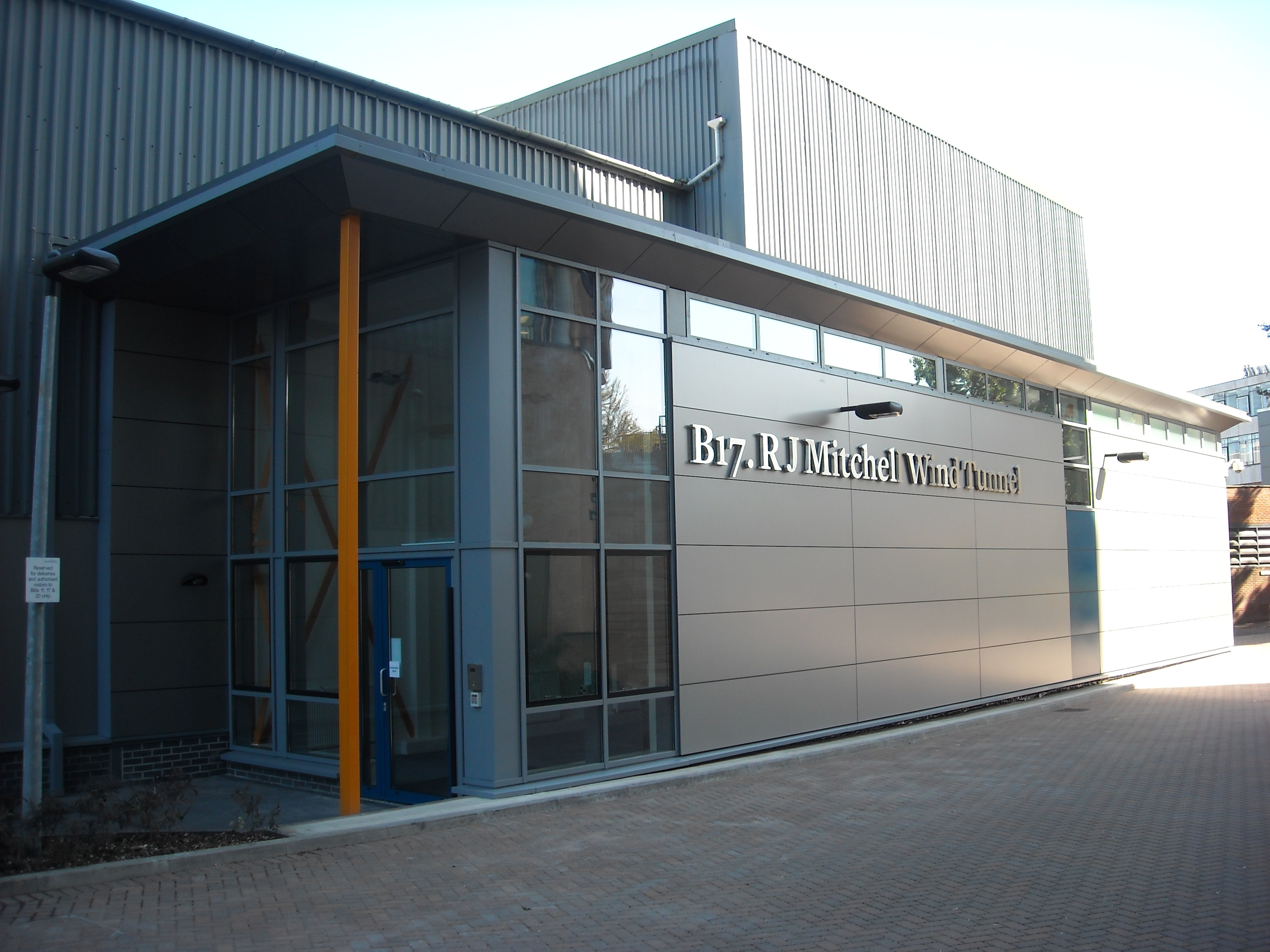
- Entrance of the wind tunnel
- Interactive map of the R. J. Mitchell Wind Tunnel area
- Former names: Farnborough No. 1 Tunnel

General information
- Type: Educational
- Location: Southampton, United Kingdom
- Coordinates: 50.936258°N 1.394589°W
- Owner: University of Southampton

The R. J. Mitchell Wind Tunnel is a low-speed wind tunnel which is part of the Faculty of Engineering and the Environment at the University of Southampton. It is the largest wind tunnel in University ownership in the UK. It is named after famed British aircraft designer R.J. Mitchell.

== History ==
The tunnel was built in the 1930s as part of the Farnborough Royal Aircraft Establishment cluster of tunnels. The tunnel was purchased by the University of Southampton for a minimal fee in 1979 on the understanding that they would cover the cost of transport and recommissioning at its new site on the Highfield Campus. This purchase was in response to a business case put forward at the time which focused around the need for more capacity to cope with increasing motorsport demand. Previously the 7x5 wind tunnel had been heavily utilised by many F1 teams and a larger facility was deemed desirable to increase model scales. The tunnel was first run in Southampton in 1981 and was formally opened by R. J. Mitchell’s son, Gordon Mitchell.

In the 1980s and 90s the tunnel was used extensively by Formula 1 teams as well as Team Penske who developed many Indy Cars in the facility. In the early 00s the tunnel was able to be utilised by University students and researchers as well as a variety of customers from various industries.

In 2013 the existing building was extended to provide a new entrance area to update the look of the building while providing new facilities for users as well as wheelchair access. This extension was formally opened by Chris Boardman in January 2014.

== National Wind Tunnel Facility ==
In January 2014 the R. J. Mitchell Wind Tunnel became a ‘National Wind Tunnel Facility’ under a government initiative announced by minister for Science and Universities David Willetts. The initiative gave 17 facilities access to a total of £13.3 million with funding coming from both EPSRC and the UK Aerodynamic Centre. The funding allocated to the tunnel was used to design and build a traverse system, install a combined chiller/heat pump into the circuit and also funded both a high resolution and high speed Particle Image Velocimetry (PIV) system.

== Capabilities ==
The R. J. Mitchell Wind Tunnel is a closed test section, closed return type wind tunnel powered by a 746 kW (1,000 hp) electric motor. The test section is 3.5m wide by 2.4m high (11 ft by 8 ft) and the tunnel is capable of creating wind speeds of up to 40 m/s (90 mph). The tunnel has a moving ground installed along with dual stage boundary layer suction for ground effect or vehicle testing.

The facility has a range of possible configurations including an overhead 6-component balance, mechanised strut with in-car 6-component balance for vehicle work as well as a 2-component underfloor dynamometer that is used primarily for performance sports work. This sports work was initiated before the 2008 Beijing Olympic Games when the tunnel was an integral part of the 'Secret Squirrel Club' used to help improve the performance of the Team GB cycle team. The success in cycling was also continued in the Winter Games when the Team GB Skeleton Bob team used the tunnel as part of a research project which resulted in Amy Williams winning Gold in Vancouver.

The facility has various data acquisition systems available including pressure scanning and PIV systems.
