= PHEDRA (Arc-jet) high enthalpy wind tunnel =

French wind tunnel

Coordinates: 47.8388°N 1.9445°E

The PHEDRA High Enthalpy low density Wind Tunnel, located at the ICARE Laboratory in Orléans, France, is a research facility used extensively for fundamental and applied research on non equilibrium plasma flows and planetary atmospheric entries. Its name is an acronym for soufflerie à Plasma Hors Equilibre de Rentreés Atmosphériques . Phedra wind tunnel takes part of the European Landscape Network portal MERIL.

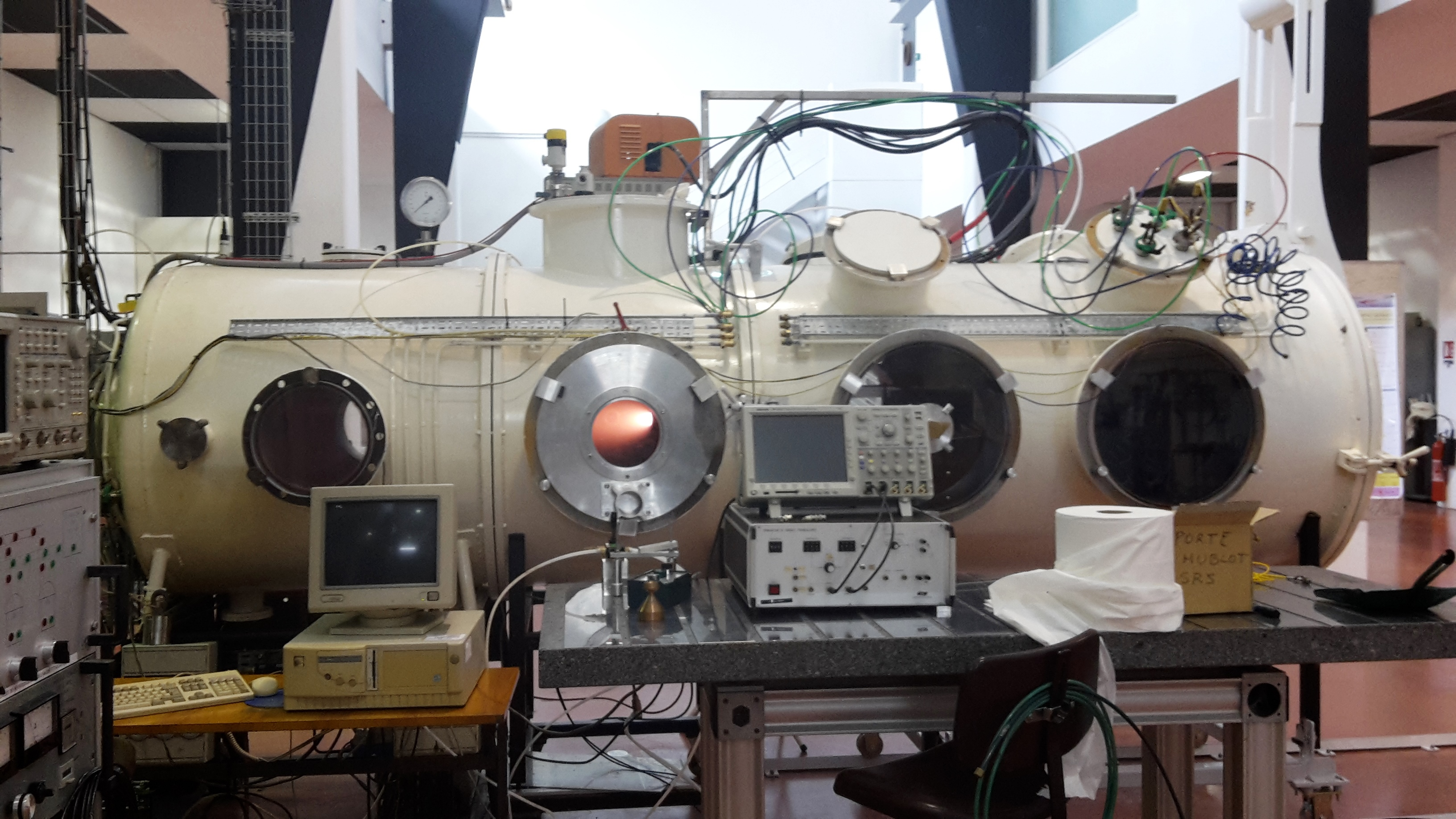
The PHEDRA facility (ICARE, CNRS Orléans, France)

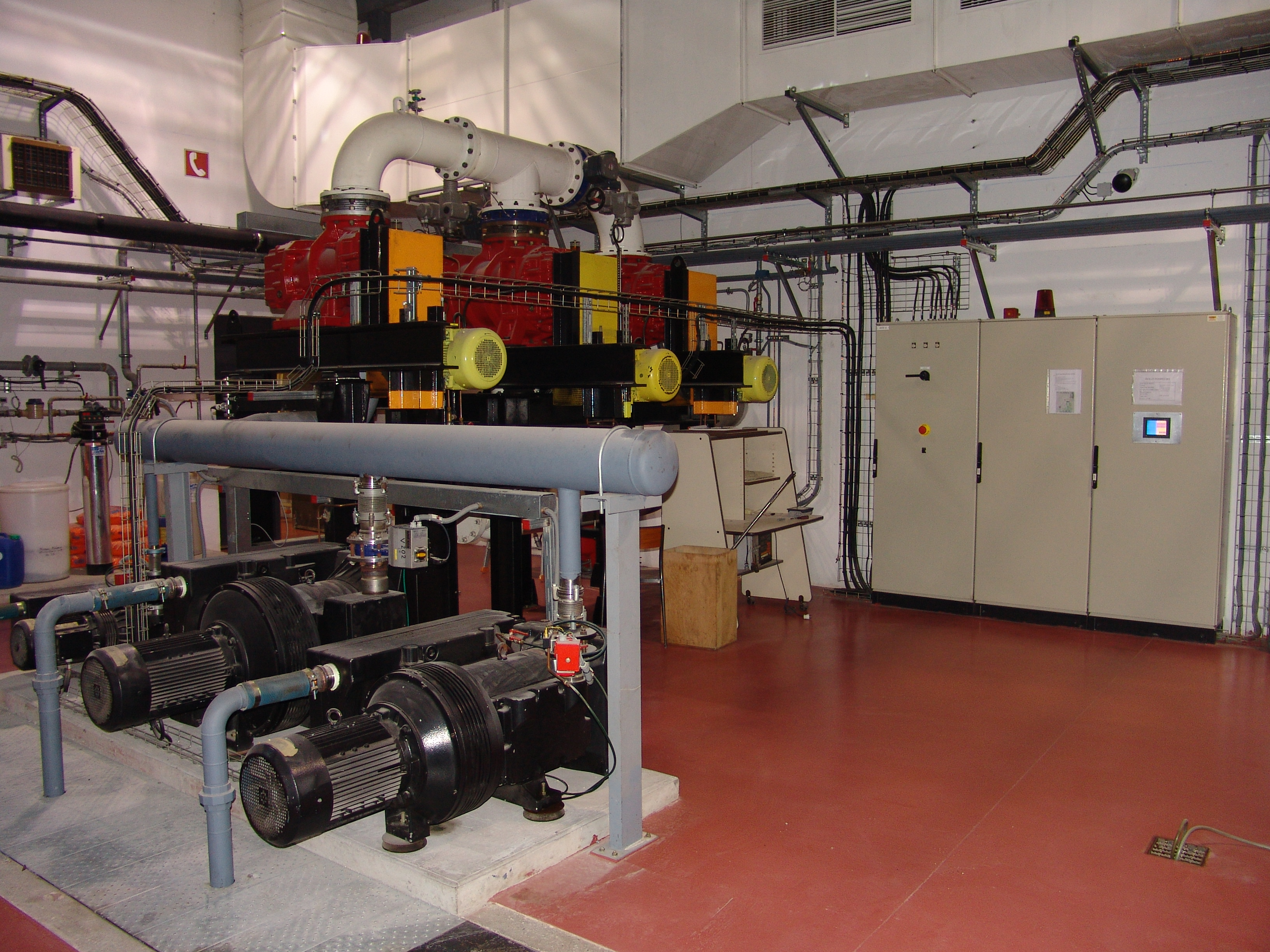
PHEDRA pumping group

== History ==
PHEDRA (ex. SR5) wind tunnel was located in the Aerothermodynamics Laboratory from the CNRS (France's national scientific research center) in Meudon, France until 2000. The wind tunnel was then moved to the ICARE Laboratory in Orleans, resulting from the merging of the Aerothermodynamics Laboratory and the LCSR (Combustion and Reactive Systems Laboratory). This facility is part of the experimental platform FAST (Facilities for Aerothermodynamics & Supersonic Technologies) belonging to ICARE Institut from CNRS, Orléans.

== Technical details ==
PHEDRA is a plasma ground test facility used to simulate low pressure flight conditions in the upper layer of the planetary atmospheres. An arc-jet generator operates in a cylindrical chamber of 1.1 m in diameter and 4.3 m length, pumped with 3 primary pumps and 3 Roots pumps, which capacity (27 000 m3/h) insures a residual pressure ranged between 1 and 100 Pa. Different working gases can be used like Argon, nitrogen, CO_{2}, CH_{4} Air, allowing the simulation of several planetary entry conditions like earth (80%N_{2}-20%O_{2}), Mars (97%CO_{2}-3%N_{2}) or Titan (99% N_{2}-1% CH_{4}).

The advantages of this unique plasma source can be found in the stability of the plasma flow, the high specific enthalpy, up to 50 MJ/kg due to the low mass flow rate and the low rate of contamination which could provides from the erosion of the cathode.

== Main features ==
- Continuous supersonic high enthalpy rarefied wind tunnel.
- 4.5m x 2.1 m test chamber
- Nozzle: conical
- Adjustable pumping group, max capacity: 26 000 m3/h
- Static pressure, Pa: 1 < Pstg < 3000
- Stagnation pressure, Pa: 20 < Po < 120 10^{5}
- Mach number: 2 < Mach < 8
- Averaged enthalpy, Mj/kg few < Ho < 50
- Working gas: N_{2}, Air, CO_{2}, CH_{4}, Air and extensive mixtures

=== Instrumentation ===
Various types of diagnostics are associated with the wind tunnel PHEDRA: Pitot Probes, Pressure sensors for parietal measurements, Heat transfer gauges, Infrared thermography camera, iCCD camera, Electrostatic probes, Optical spectrometry (near IR, visible and VUV).

These functions are used in fundamental and applied studies of Compressible Aerodynamics, Aerothermodynamics, Atmospheric entries, and Gas and Plasma Physics.

== Purpose & use ==
The wind tunnel PHEDRA is extensively used for fundamental and applied research into planetary atmospheric entry, as well as;

- Fundamental research of high enthalpy fluid dynamic phenomena in non-equilibrium flows
- Plasma dynamics
- Experimental data base on planetary atmospheric entries : MARS, EARTH, TITAN, VENUS
- Aerodynamic and aerothermal behavior of probes and models
- Plasma flow control with MHD.
- Atmospheric entry space debris

== Gallery ==
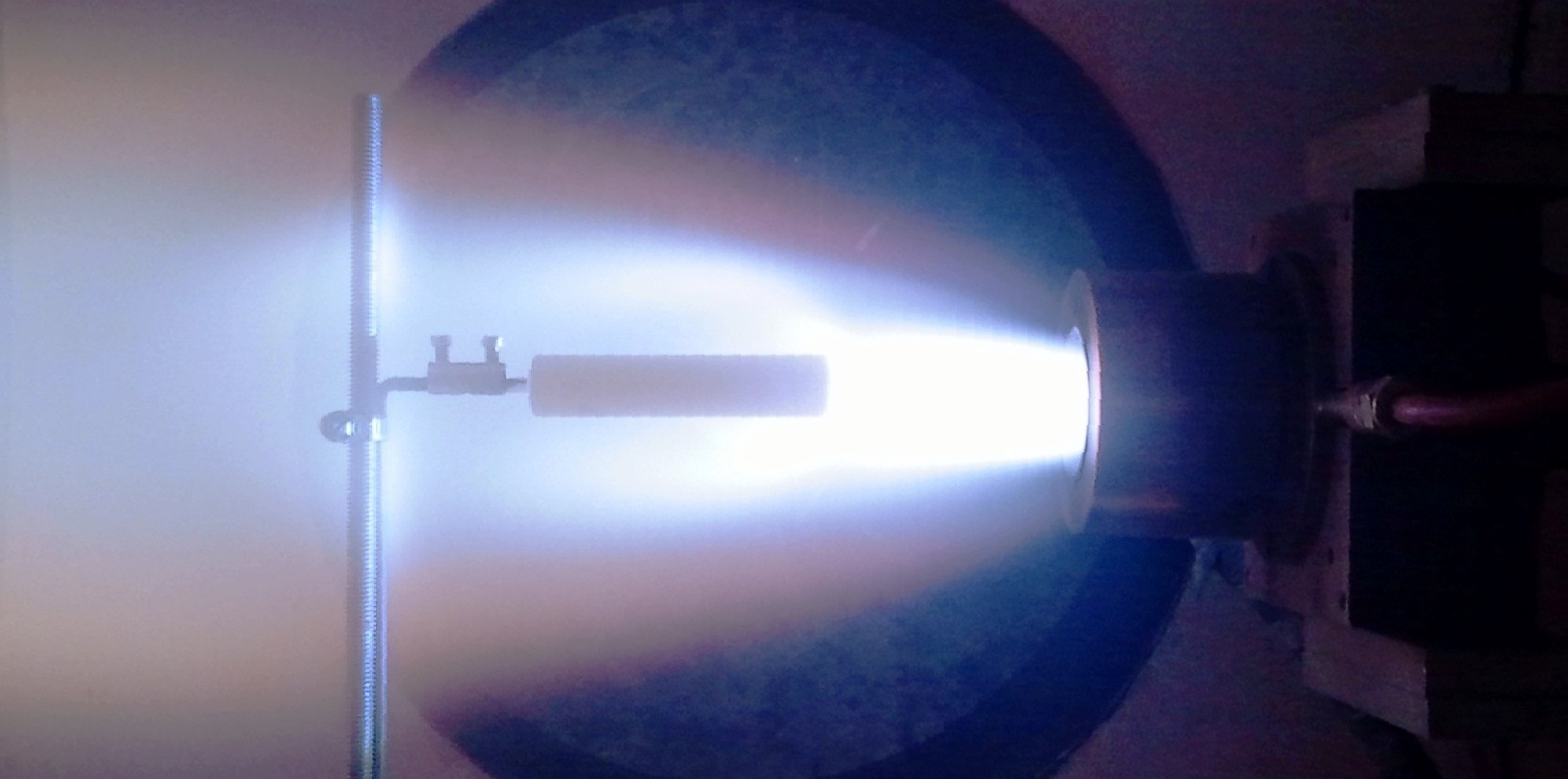
Blunt cylinder in a low pressure supersonic argon plasma flow in the Phedra facility. Phedra facility, ICARE, CNRS (Viviana Lago).

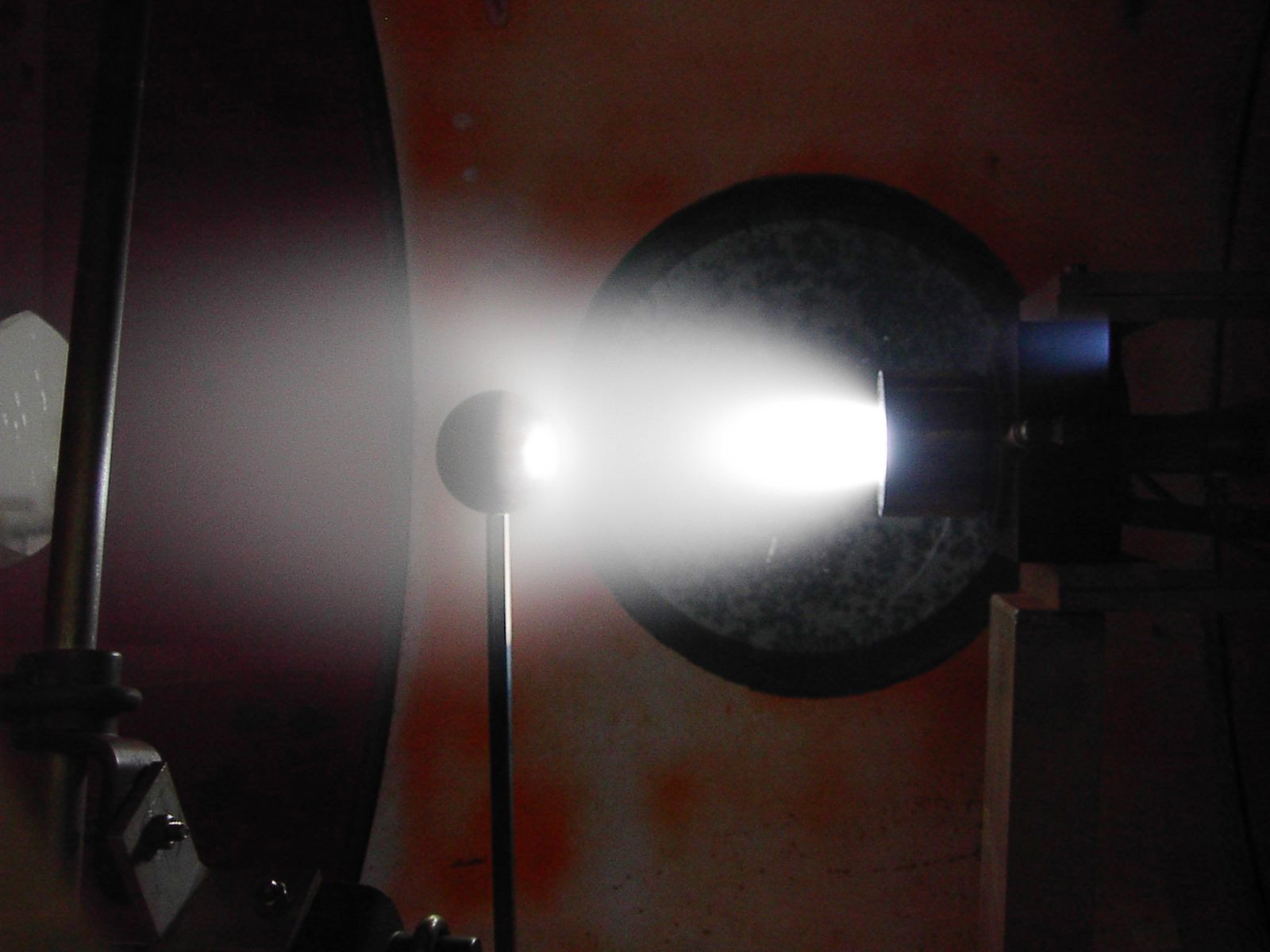
Spheric model interacting with CO_{2}/N_{2} 'Mars' like plasma low pressure supersonic flow. Phedra facility, ICARE, CNRS (Viviana Lago).

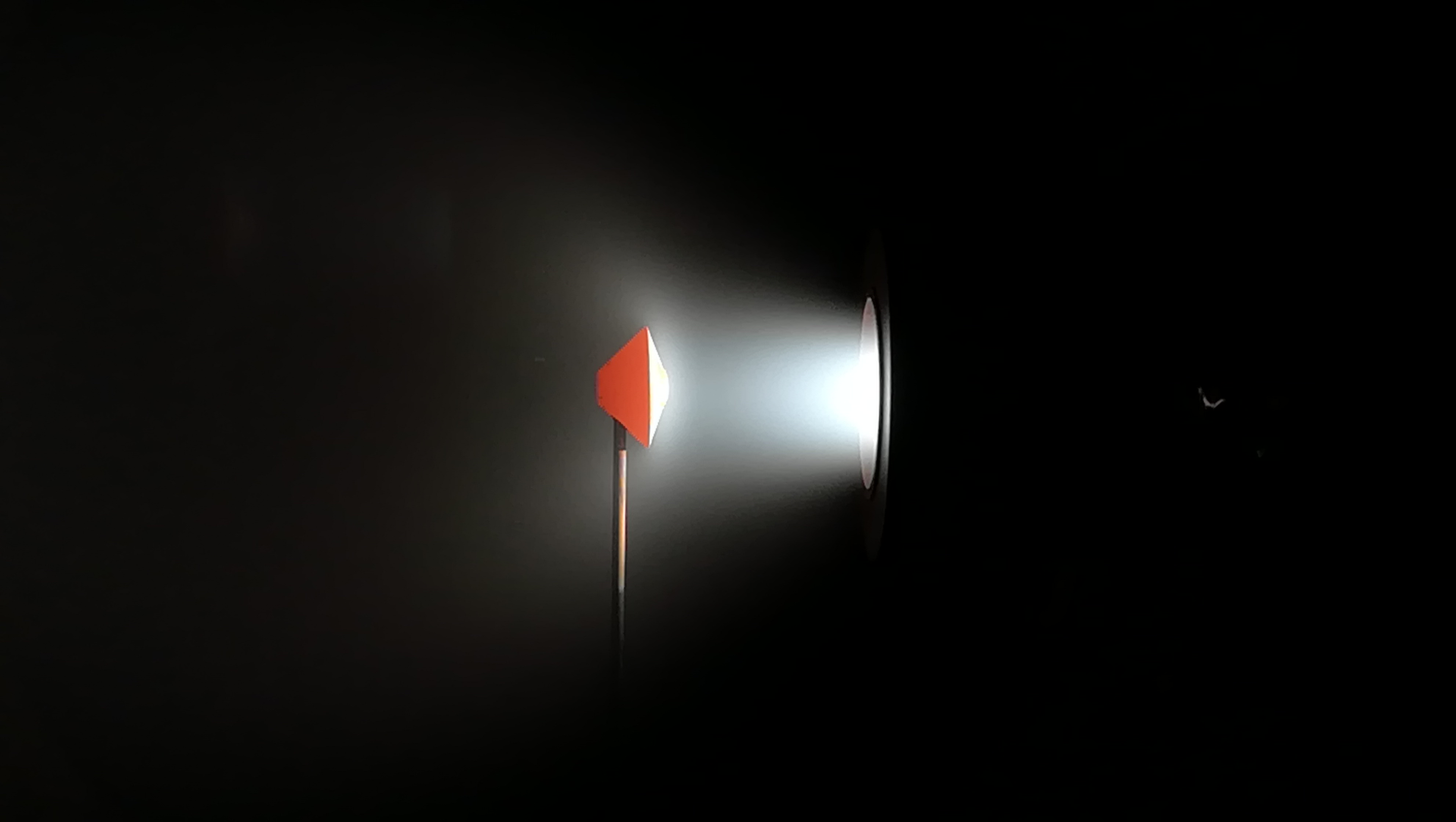
Capsule model interacting with CO_{2}/N_{2} 'Mars' like plasma low pressure supersonic flow. Phedra facility, ICARE, CNRS Viviana Lago).
