= Jules Verne climatic wind tunnel =

French wind tunnel

The Jules Verne climatic wind tunnel is a research facility at the Scientific and Technical Centre for Building (CSTB) site in Nantes, France. It enables the study of building and construction components, vehicles and equipment under a range of climatic conditions, being able to simulate snow, hail, rain, fog, sandstorms, heatwaves and freezing conditions.

It is classified as a major research facility and was reopened on 29 March 2019 by Francois de Rugy, Minister of State following an €8.5 million upgrade programme funded by Nantes Métropole, the Pays de la Loire region and the European Regional Investment Fund (FEDER).

In 2018 the wind tunnel was used by UNICEF for their innovation programme to develop a new series of high performance tents.
