= Mentor Graphics =

Electronic design automation company

Mentor Graphics Corporation

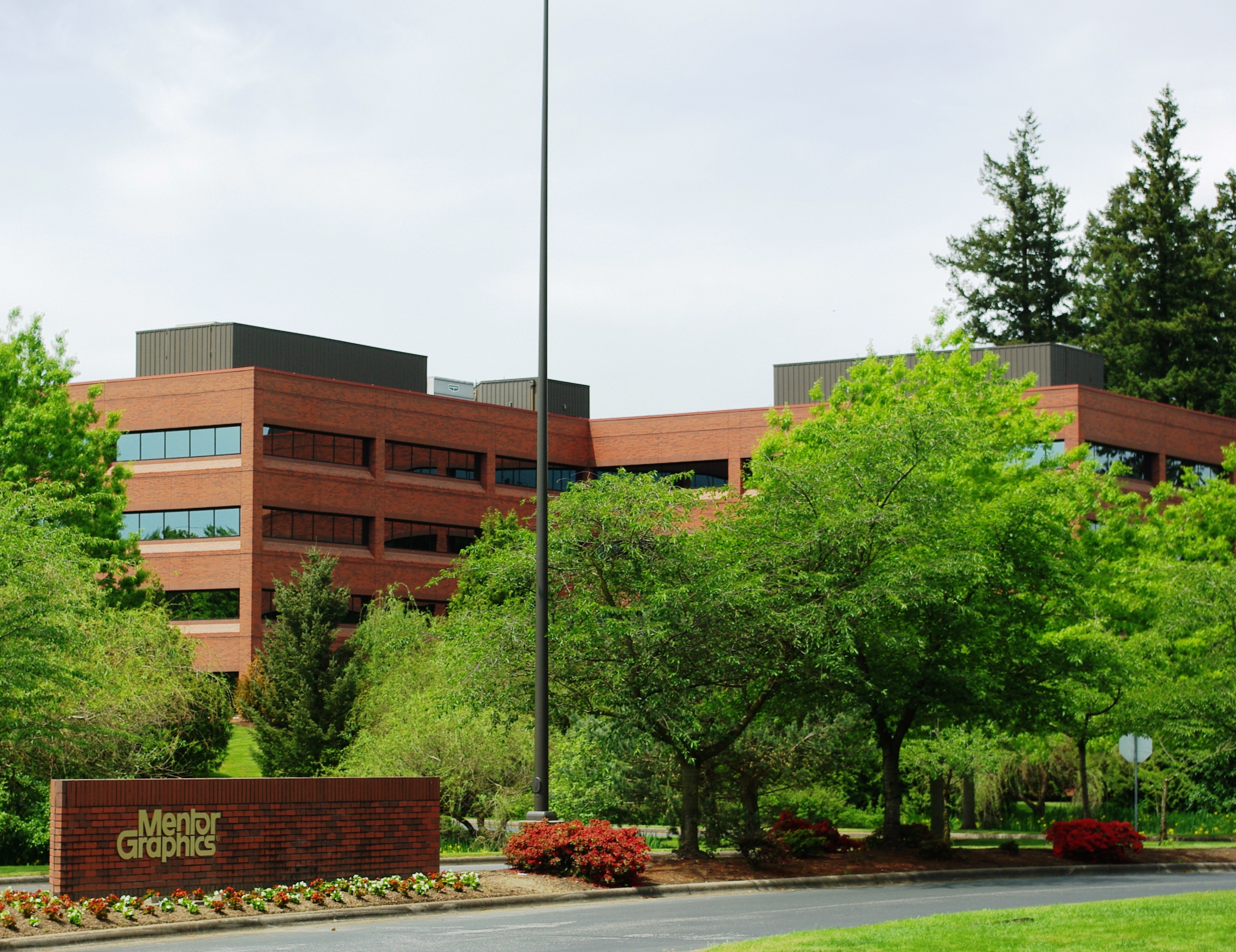
- Headquarters in Wilsonville, Oregon
- Type: Private
- Industry: EDA, Embedded Software
- Founded: 1981
- Founder: Tom Bruggere
- Fate: Acquired by Siemens and merged into Siemens Digital Industries Software
- Headquarters: Wilsonville, Oregon, United States; 45°19′10″N 122°45′46″W
- Products: Nucleus OS, Sourcery CodeBench, ModelSim/QuestaSim, Calibre, Veloce
- Revenue: ▲$1.28B USD (2017)
- Net income: ▲$155 million USD (2017)
- Total assets: ▲US$ 1.745284 billion (2013); ▲US$ 1.550675 billion (2012)
- Number of employees: 5,968 (2017)
- Parent: Siemens

Mentor Graphics Corporation was a US-based electronic design automation (EDA) multinational corporation for electrical engineering and electronics, headquartered in Wilsonville, Oregon. Founded in 1981, the company distributed products that assist in electronic design automation, simulation tools for analog mixed-signal design, VPN solutions, and fluid dynamics and heat transfer tools. The company leveraged Apollo Computer workstations to differentiate itself within the computer-aided engineering (CAE) market with its software and hardware.

Mentor Graphics was acquired by Siemens in 2017. The name was retired in 2021 and renamed Siemens EDA, a segment of Siemens Digital Industries Software.

== History ==
Mentor Graphics was founded in 1981 by Tom Bruggere, Gerry Langeler, and Dave Moffenbeier, all formerly of Tektronix. The company raised $55 million in funding through an initial public offering in 1984.

Mentor initially wrote software that ran only in Apollo workstations.

When Mentor entered the CAE market the company had two technical differentiators: the first was the software – Mentor, Valid, and Daisy each had software with different strengths and weaknesses. The second, was the hardware – Mentor ran all programs on the Apollo workstation, while Daisy and Valid each built their own hardware. By the late 1980s, all EDA companies abandoned proprietary hardware in favor of workstations manufactured by companies such as Apollo and Sun Microsystems.

After a frenzied development, the IDEA 1000 product was introduced at the 1982 Design Automation Conference, though in a suite and not on the floor.

Mentor Graphics was purchased by Siemens in 2017. The name was retired in 2021 and renamed Siemens EDA, a segment of Siemens Digital Industries Software.

== Acquisitions ==
=== Timeline ===
Year announced	Company	Business	Value (USD)	References
1995	Microtec Research	Software development	$130 million	
1999	VeriBest	EDA subsidiary of Intergraph Corp.	not disclosed	
2002	Accelerated Technology	RTOS & embedded software	not disclosed	
2002	Innoveda	Printed circuit board & wire harness design	$160 million	
2002	IKOS Systems	Emulation product	$124 million	
2004	Project Technology	Executable UML	not disclosed	
2007	Sierra Design Automation	Place and route	$90 million	
2008	Flomerics	Computational fluid dynamics	$59.72 million	
2009	LogicVision	Silicon manufacturing testing	$13 million	
2010	Valor Computerized Systems	PCB systems manufacturing	$82 million	
2010	CodeSourcery	GNU-based tools	not disclosed	
2014	Nimbic	Electromagnetic simulation	not disclosed	
2014	Berkeley Design Automation	AMS circuit verification	not disclosed	
2015	Tanner EDA	AMS & MEMS integrated circuits	not disclosed	
2015	Calypto Design Systems	High level synthesis	not disclosed	

=== Related ===
- In June 2008, Cadence Design Systems offered to acquire Mentor Graphics in a leveraged buyout. On 15 August 2008, Cadence withdrew this offer quoting an inability to raise the necessary capital and the unwillingness of Mentor Graphics' Board and management to discuss the offer.
- In February 2011, activist investor Carl Icahn offered to buy the company for about $1.86 billion in cash.
- In November 2016, Mentor Graphics announced that it was to be acquired by Siemens for $4.5 billion, at $37.25 per share, a 21% premium on Mentor's closing price on the previous Friday. The acquisition was completed in March 2017. At the time, this represented Siemens' biggest deal in the industrial software sector. Mentor Graphics started to operate as "Mentor, a Siemens Business". Under the terms of the acquisition, Mentor Graphics kept its headquarters in Wilsonville with workforce intact, and operated as an independent subsidiary.
- In January 2021, Mentor became a division of Siemens and was renamed as Siemens EDA.

== Locations ==
Mentor product development was located in the US, Taiwan, Egypt, Poland, Hungary, Japan, France, Canada, Pakistan, UK, Armenia, India and Russia.

== Products ==
Mentor offered the following tools:

=== Electronic design automation ===
- Integrated circuit layout full-custom and schematic-driven layout (SDL) tools such as IC Station or Memory Builder, a first industry tool for rapid embedded memory design that helped to develop single- or dual-port RAM (synchronous and asynchronous), as well as diffusion and metal read only memories (ROM)
- IC place and route tool: Aprisa
- IC Verification tools such as Calibre nmDRC, Calibre nmLVS, Calibre xRC, Calibre xACT 3D, Calibre xACT
- IC Design for Manufacturing tools such as Calibre LFD, Calibre YieldEnhancer, Calibre, and YieldAnalyzer
- Schematic capture editors for electronic schematics such as Xpedition Designer
- Layout and design tools for printed circuit boards with programs such as PADS, Xpedition Layout, HyperLynx and Valor NPI
- Falcon Framework, software application framework
- Component library management tools
- IP cores for ASIC and FPGA designs

=== Embedded systems ===
- Mentor Embedded Linux for ARM, MIPS, Power, and x86 architecture processors
- Real-time operating systems:
  - Nucleus OS (acquired in 2002 when Mentor acquired Accelerated Technology, Inc.)
  - VRTX (acquired in 1995 when Mentor bought Microtec Research)
- AUTOSAR implementation:
  - Embedded implementation VSTAR in part acquired from Mecel in 2013
  - Configuration tooling Volcano Vehicle Systems Builder (VSB)
- Development Tools:
  - Sourcery CodeBench and Sourcery GNU toolchains (acquired in 2010 when Mentor acquired CodeSourcery)
- Inflexion UI – (Next Device was acquired by Mentor in 2006)
  - xtUML Design Tools: BridgePoint (acquired in 2004 when Mentor acquired Project Technology)
- VPN Solutions:
  - Nucleus Point-to-Point Tunneling Protocol (PPTP) software
  - Nucleus NET networking stack
  - Nucleus implementation of the Microsoft Point-to-Point Encryption (MPPE) protocol
  - Nucleus PPP software

=== FPGA synthesis ===
- Precision Synthesis – Advanced RTL & physical synthesis for FPGAs

=== Electrical systems, cabling, and harness ===
- Capital – a suite of integrated tools for the design, validation and manufacture of electrical systems and harnesses
- VeSys – a mid-market toolset for vehicle electrical system and harness design

=== Simulation ===
- ModelSim is a hardware simulation and debug environment primarily targeted at smaller ASIC and FPGA design
- QuestaSim is a simulator with advanced debug capabilities targeted at complex FPGA's and SoC's. QuestaSim can be used by users who have experience with ModelSim as it shares most of the common debug features and capabilities. One of the main differences between QuestaSim and Modelsim (besides performance/capacity) is that QuestaSim is the simulation engine for the Questa Platform which includes integration of Verification Management, Formal based technologies, Questa Verification IP, Low Power Simulation and Accelerated Coverage Closure technologies. QuestaSim natively supports SystemVerilog for Testbench, UPF, UCIS, OVM/UVM whereas ModelSim does not.
- Eldo is a SPICE simulator
- Xpedition AMS is a virtual lab for mechatronic system design and analysis
- ADiT is a Fast-SPICE simulator
- Questa ADMS is a mixed-signal verification tool

=== Emulation ===
- The Veloce product family enables SoC emulation and transaction-based acceleration to verify and rectify issues on HDL designs prefabrication.

=== Mechanical design ===
- Fluid Dynamics and Heat Transfer tools:
  - Simcenter Flotherm is a Computational Fluid Dynamics tool dedicated to electronics cooling using parameterized 'SmartParts' for common electronic components such as fans, heatsinks, and IC packages.
  - Simcenter Flotherm XT is an electronics cooling CFD tool incorporating a solid modeler for manipulating MCAD parts.
  - Simcenter FLOEFD is a 'design concurrent' CFD tool for use in early-stage product design and is embedded within MCAD systems such as Solidworks, Creo Elements/Pro, CATIA V5 and Siemens NX.
- Thermal Characterization and Thermal Interface Material (TIM) Measurement equipment:
  - Simcenter T3STER is a hardware product that embodies an implementation of the JEDEC JESD51-1 standard for IC package thermal characterization and is compliant with JESD51-14 for Rth-JC measurement.
  - Simcenter TERALED provides automation of the CIE 127:2007 standard providing total flux, chromaticity and correlated color temperature (CCT) for power LEDs. With T3Ster it provides thermal resistance metrics for LEDs based on the real dissipated heating power.
  - Simcenter DYNTIM extends T3Ster, providing a dynamic thermal test station for thermal conductivity measurements of thermal interface materials (TIMs), thermal greases and gap pads.
- Simcenter Flomaster is a 1D or system-level CFD solution for analyzing fluid mechanics in complex pipe flow systems (from the acquisition of Flowmaster Ltd in 2012).
- CADRA Design Drafting is a 2-1/2D mechanical drafting and documentation package specifically designed for drafting professionals. It provides the tools needed to develop complex drawings quickly and easily (from the acquisition of the CADRA product in 2013).

== See also ==
- List of EDA companies
- Comparison of EDA software
