= A2 Wind Tunnel =

Wind tunnel in Mooresville, North Carolina, U.S.

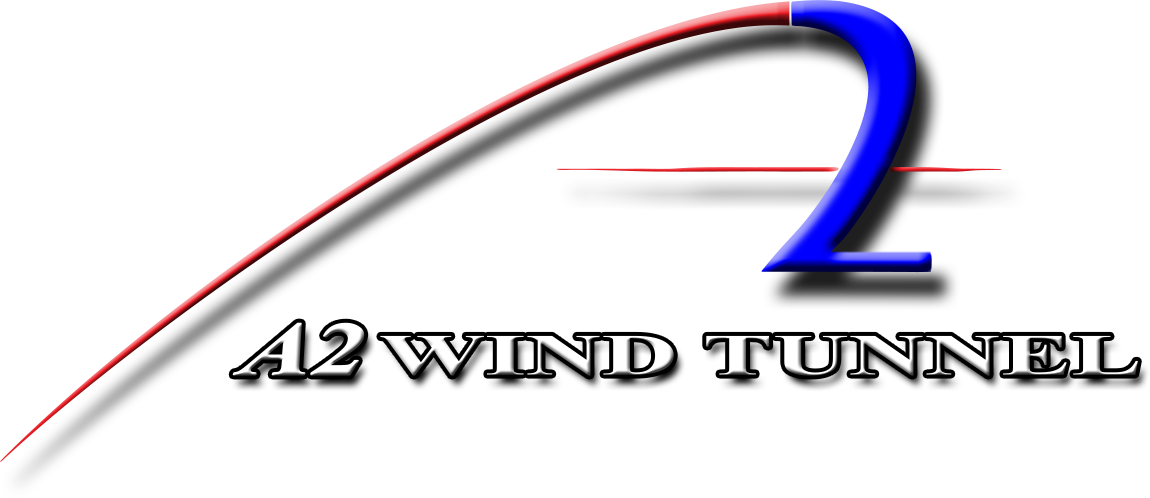

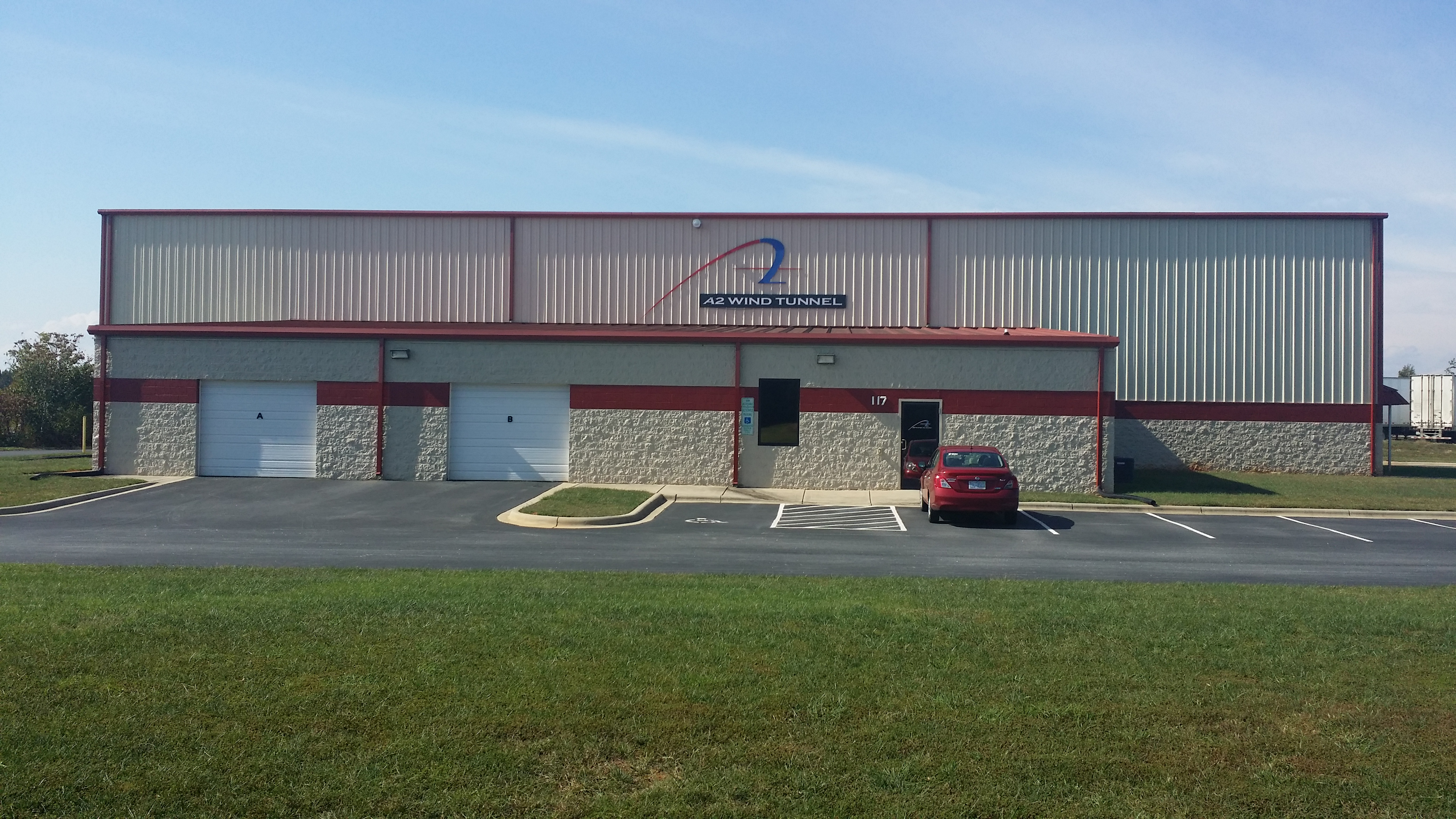
- Exterior of A2 Wind Tunnel
- Headquarters: 117 Godspeed Ln. Mooresville, North Carolina
- Owner: Gary Eaker
- Website: a2wt.com

A2 Wind Tunnel is a full-scale general-purpose open-return wind tunnel located in Mooresville, North Carolina. Created in 2006 by Gary Eaker, the tunnel is able to host a variety of objects including full scale cars, motorcycles, and bicycles.

Some of the more notable entities to utilize testing at A2 Wind Tunnel include Lance Armstrong, Kristin Armstrong, the 2010 Winter Olympics gold medalist U.S. bobsled team with "NightTrain." The tunnel has also been the site of filming for several entities including the band Saving Abel for the music video Drowning (Face Down) in 2009, and a Dale Earnhardt documentary.
