= British Hydromechanics Research Association =

Hydromechanical research consortium in the UK

- Abbreviation: BHRA
- Successor: Framatome BHR (BHR Group)
- Formation: September 20, 1947
- Founded at: Essex, England
- Dissolved: October 16, 1989
- Type: Government research association (later private consultancy)
- Legal status: Privatised
- Headquarters: Cranfield, Bedfordshire
- Location: England
- Region served: United Kingdom
- Affiliations: National Centre for Materials Handling
- Website: www.bhrgroup.com
- Formerly called: BHRA Fluid Engineering

The British Hydromechanics Research Association (BHRA) is a former research association that currently provides consulting engineering expertise relating to the field of fluid dynamics.

== History ==
The British Hydromechanics Research Association (BRHA) was incorporated as a limited company on 20 September 1947. Its creation had been driven by competitive pressures within the field of hydraulics, which had led senior figures within the industry industry to recognise that long term collaborative research and development efforts would be vital to sustaining and growing the sector, and thus that an organisation ought to be formed to fulfil this purpose.

While the BHRA's founding had been endorsed by the Department of Scientific and Industrial Research, it did not initially receive any form of grant from the British government. Direct control of the BHRA came from its subscribing members within the industry, which not only comprised the manufacturers themselves but also major users as well. In October 1947, Sir John Anderson was appointed as the first president of the BHRA while L. E. Prosser became its first director of research in April 1948. By April 1939, 31 manufacturers had become members.

On 21 June 1966, the BHRA's new laboratories in Bedfordshire were officially opened by Prince Philip, Duke of Edinburgh. This location was alongside the National Centre for Materials Handling, set up by the Ministry of Technology (MinTech), later known as the National Materials Handling Centre.

During 1969, the BHRA held its first international conference outside of the UK.

In the 1970s, it was rebranded as BHRA Fluid Engineering.

== Reorganisation and acquisition ==
On 16 October 1989, it became a private consultancy; it was subsequently rebranded as BHR Group. It operates as an independent research specialist in the application of fluid engineering to industrial processes and providing its independent, impartial expertise to various international companies. Major clients of BHR Group include Shell plc, Dow Chemical Company, Mott MacDonald, and Sellafield.

By 2014, BHR Group employed 84 staff, these typically being either scientists, engineers, or commercial employees. During the mid-2010s, the company was expanding its operations, including into the Middle East, where BHR's management had identified considerable demand for its services. One year later, BHR Group opened a new test facility in Cranfield that provided the UK's first onshore environment for accurately reproducing the downhole oil well environment, primarily relevant to the oil and gas sector.

During September 2021, BHR Group was acquired by the French nuclear technology specialist Framatome, after which it was rebranded as Framatome BHR. It is presently based in Cranfield in west Bedfordshire, near the M1.

== Applications ==
By 1950, the BHRA had conducted research into the characteristics of natural water channels, coastal erosion, and estuaries; in support of these studies, it had been involved in the development of a pneumatic tide generator capable of automatically reproducing any desired tidal condition.

In the 1960s, it conducted substantial research on the aerodynamics of British power station infrastructure, such as cooling towers.

In the 1970s, the BHSA collated research into offshore structures, of particular relevance to the oil and gas extraction industry.

In 1966, it produced an early design for the Thames Barrier.

It developed early software for computational fluid dynamics (CFD), leading to the creation of Flowmaster Ltd..

== See also ==
- Bierrum, has built and designed Britain's power station cooling towers since 1965, also in Bedfordshire.
