= European Transonic Wind Tunnel =

Transonic wind tunnel using nitrogen as test gas

Coordinates: 50.8506°N 7.1207°E

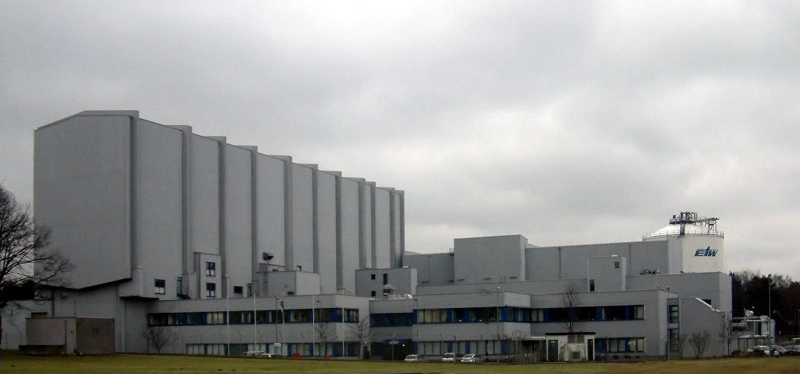
External view of the ETW

The European transonic wind tunnel (ETW) is a high-Reynolds-number transonic wind tunnel using nitrogen as the test gas.

It is one of the world's largest cryogenic wind tunnels. It is situated in Cologne, Germany. ETW was constructed and is operated by the four European countries France, Germany, Great Britain and the Netherlands. The ETW has been in operation since 1994.

ETW provides real-flight Reynolds numbers by virtue of both increased pressure and decreased temperature. Independent variation of Reynolds number and aeroelastic loading can be investigated. They specialize in flight Reynolds number testing for full-span and semi-span models at cruise conditions and extreme borders of the flight envelope.

== Tunnel parameters ==
The tunnel parameters are as follows:

- Test Section: 2.4 m x 2.0 m; length 9 m
- Mach Number Range: 0.15 - 1.3
- Pressure Range: 1.25 - 4.5 bar
- Temperature Range: 110 - 313 K
- Max. Reynolds number: 50 million per m

Optical access to the test section for various cameras and light sources is provided through 90 special windows in all walls.

== Wind tunnel circuit ==
ETW has a closed aerodynamic circuit contained inside an internally insulated stainless steel pressure shell. The compressor with a drive power of up to 50 MW circulates the nitrogen gas around the circuit. To achieve the desired low temperature of the gas flow and to compensate for the heat input caused by viscous friction in the flow, liquid nitrogen with a temperature of -196 °C is continuously injected into the tunnel flow through four rakes with some 270 spray nozzles in the short leg of the circuit upstream of the compressor. This liquid nitrogen vaporizes immediately and thus forms the cold gas flow. The corresponding gaseous nitrogen exhaust is located in the other short leg of the circuit upstream of the stilling chamber and is controlled by valves to maintain constant pressure inside the tunnel.

=== Test Section ===
Test section details:

- Dimensions (H x W x L): 2.00m x 2.40 m x 9.00 m (incl. re-entry).
- Wall Configuration:

Top and bottom walls: 6 slots each, with 6.25% porosity, wall angle remotely adjustable
Side walls: 4 slots each, with 7.4% porosity

- Re-entry area: provided by movable finger flaps (one per slot)

An exchangeable model cart system is present to increase the productivity.

== Tunnel instrumentation ==
The instrumentation facilities include flange type strain gauge balances, servoaccelerometer inclinometer, Kulite measurement system, Deformation Measurement System, Temperature Sensitive Paint System and mini tufts.
