= National Transonic Facility =

Closed circuit wind tunnel of Research center Hampton

Coordinates: 37°5′1″N 76°20′30″W

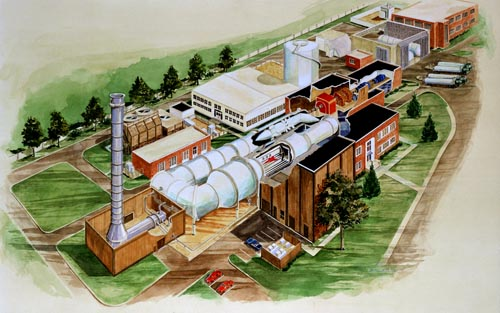
cutout view of NTF and the wind tunnel circuit

The National Transonic Facility (NTF), also known internally as facility 1236, is a high-pressure, cryogenic, closed-circuit wind tunnel at the Langley Research Center in Hampton, Virginia. It uses nitrogen gas, at high pressure, to cool the air which allows flight aerodynamics to be duplicated in small scale. The cross section of the tunnel is 8.2 feet (2.5 m) high and 8.2 feet (2.5 m) wide. Unlike full-scale wind tunnels, the NTF can adjust airflow to match any model size down to 1/50 scale. The facility can operate at temperatures ranging from -250°F to + 150°F. To achieve lower than ambient temperature, liquid nitrogen is sprayed into the tunnel through nozzles upwind of the fan used to accelerate the air.

The facility has tested aircraft such as the Boeing 777, Boeing 767, Space Shuttle as well as blended wing designs such as the B-2 bomber, A-6 Intruder, F-18 Hornet.

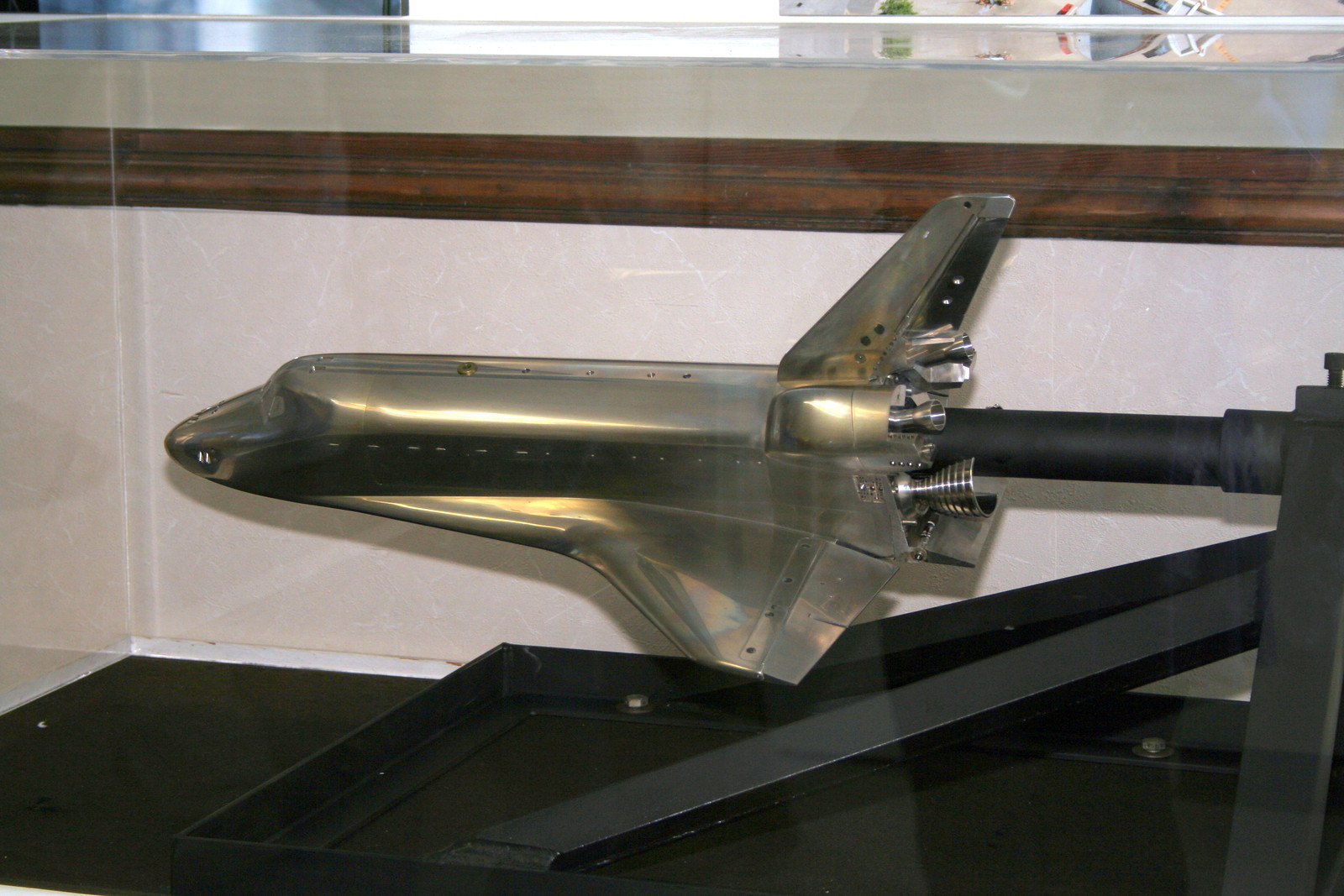
Space Shuttle model used in testing at the NTF

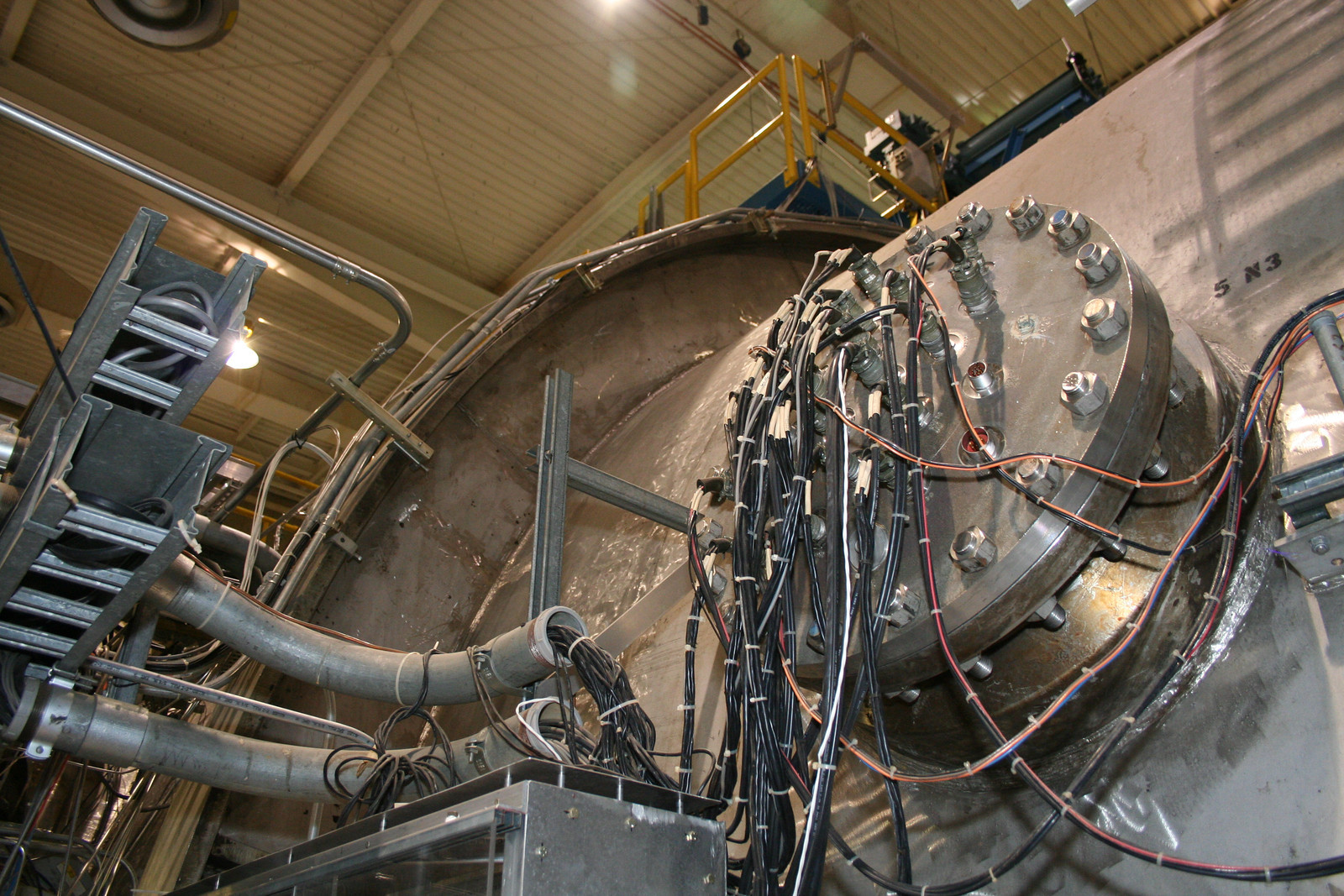
Instrumentation penetration

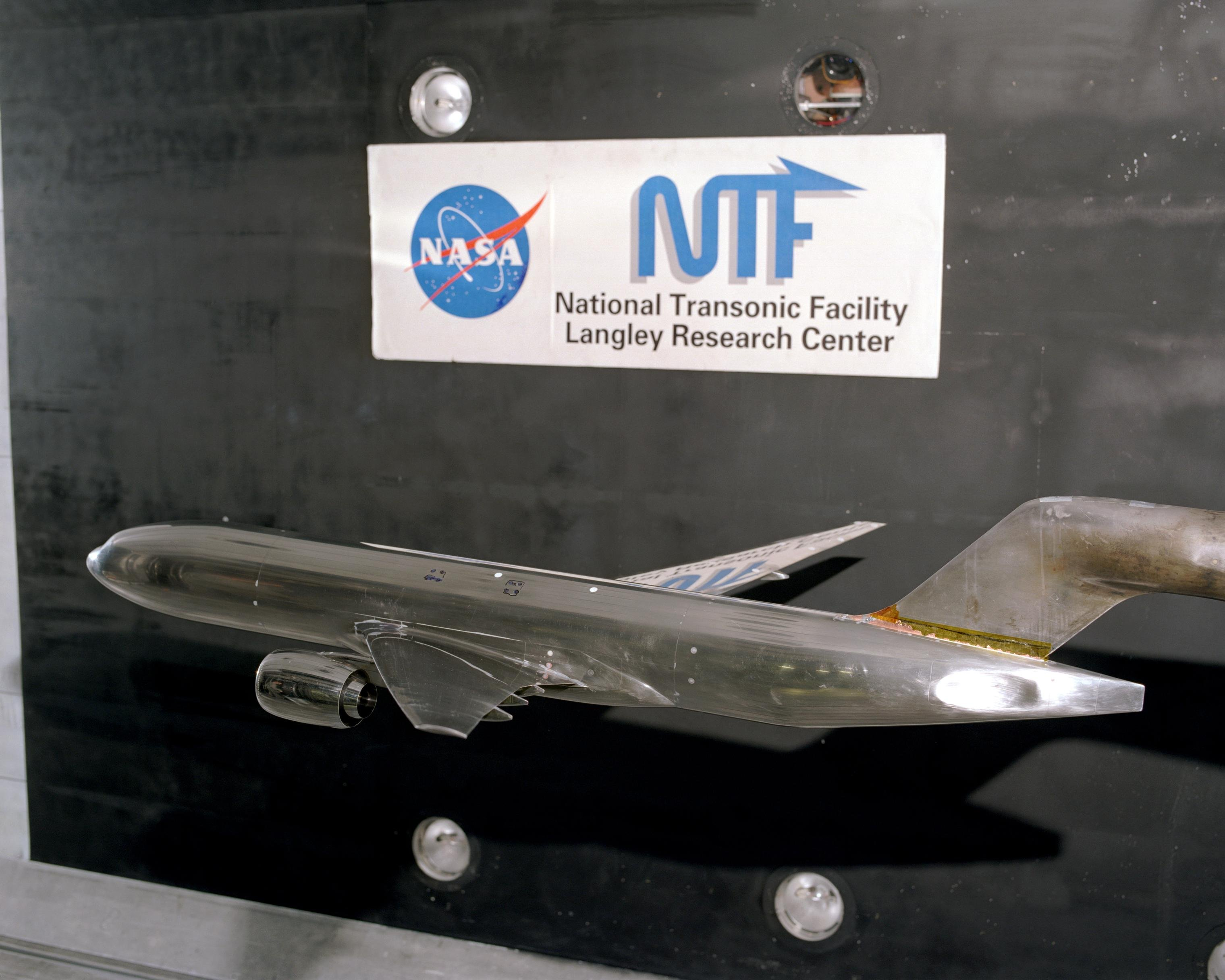
Boeing 777 model under test
