= National Wind Tunnel Facility =

UK-based research initiative

The National Wind Tunnel Facility (NWTF), is an initiative in which 17 wind tunnels distributed across 12 UK universities (host institutions) are made open access (for up to 25% of time) to external researchers in the UK and abroad, from both university and industry based.

NWTF is intended to be as inclusive as possible while still supporting the best science. The scheme was announced on 9 January 2014 by David Willetts, Minister for Science and Universities. The total initial funding for the facility was £13.3 million, £10.7 million coming from EPSRC and £2.6 million from the UK Aerospace Technology Institute.

The EPSRC and ATI decided to fund the NWTF in order to match the UK talent base to world-class wind tunnel facilities. The enhanced UK capability in experimental aerodynamics is available to all UK-based researchers. The stated aim was to create nodes of excellence attracting young researchers. Another aim was to establish a closer tie with industry, creating a pull-through environment and an intended spill-over of the collaboration and benefits to other sectors.

The initial NWTF programme had a duration of five years, ending in 2018. As of 2026, this was most recently renewed in 2023.

== Wind tunnels available ==
As of March 2026 the NWTF consists of the following facilities:

Institution	Name	Designation
University of Birmingham	Atmospheric Boundary Layer (ABL)	Open-circuit tunnel
University of Birmingham	TRAIN rig	Low Speed, Train rig
University of Bristol	Boundary Layer Wind Tunnel	Boundary layer wind tunnel
University of Bristol	Aeroacoustic	Low Speed, Aeroacoustic
University of Cambridge	Transonic and Supersonic	Open return blow down; two identical facilities
City St George's, University of London	Transonic/Supersonic	Closed return, induction driven
City St George's, University of London	Low Turbulence	Low Speed, closed return
Cranfield University	8ft x 6ft Low Speed	Closed return
Cranfield University	Low Speed 8x4 Boundary Layer Wind Tunnel (LS3)	Low speed closed return
Cranfield University	Icing Tunnel	Open return
Glasgow	deHavilland Low Speed Wind Tunnel	Low speed
Imperial College London	10ft x 5ft Low Speed	Low speed, closed return
Imperial College London	Supersonic	Intermittent hybrid blow-down / suck-down arrangement
Imperial College London	Hypersonic	Intermittent impulsive facility
Loughborough University	Automotive	Open circuit, closed throat
University of Manchester	Human-Flow Interactions Wind Tunnel	Human-flow interaction wind tunnel
University of Manchester	High Supersonic Tunnel (HSST)	Blow-down
University of Oxford	T6 Piston Reflected Shock	Intermittent blowdown
University of Oxford	Low Density Tunnel	Rarefied flow
University of Oxford	High Density Tunnel	Heated Ludweig tube
University of Southampton	R J Mitchell Wind Tunnel	Closed return
University of Southampton	Anechoic	Anechoic
University of Southampton	Towing Tank	Towing and wave tank
University of Surrey	Environmental Flow (EnFlo)	Meteorological wind tunnel

== Governance ==
The NWTF has a management board that meets quarterly, and an advisory board that meets twice a year. The advisory board is composed of representatives from EPSRC, ATI, senior academics (from the UK and abroad), user representatives, an existing national facility manager and a wind tunnel manager.
