= Electronics cooling =

Electronics cooling encompasses thermal design, analysis and experimental characterization of electronic systems as a discrete discipline with the product creation process for an electronics product, or an electronics sub-system within a product (e.g. an engine control unit (ECU) for a car). On-line sources of information are available and a number of books have been published on this topic.

Computer cooling is a sub-topic. Heat sinks are devices that are used to extend the surface area of electronic components available for air cooling, helping to lower the components case temperature. Fans are used to increase the air flow.

Thermal design and analysis is performed using hand calculations or spreadsheets, based on design rules or heat transfer correlations. Computer-aided engineering tools such as computational fluid dynamics are also used.

== Active electronics cooling ==
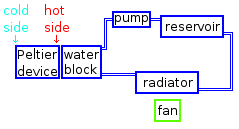
Regular Peltier cooling setup for electronics

Besides passive heat conduction, active cooling consuming electricity can be achieved through the thermoelectric coolers.

When electrical voltage is added to an n-type (p-type) semiconductor material, the electric field will drive electrons (holes) from one end to the other, which will also carry the electronic kinetic energy and entropy. A temperature gradient will be finally built up to balance the driven force of electrical field. This is called the Peltier effect, and the refrigeration or cooling device made based on this effect is called the Peltier cooler. One Peltier cooler is at least consisted of one n-leg and one p-leg, which is also called a Peltier junction. Although, Peltier coolers are generally only around 10-15% as efficient as a reversed Carnot cycle, or as 40–60% efficient as a vapor-compression cycle, it may be the only choice for applications in some special scenarios, including electronics on satellites, in submarines, and at an extremely compact space, due to their solid state nature, low maintenance need, compact size and noise-free operation.

Multiple Peltier junctions, taking care of each specific temperature window, can usually be stacked to further enhance the overall performance on electronics cooling. As active heat pumps which consume power, thermoelectric coolers can produce temperatures below ambient, which is impossible with passive heatsinks, radiator-cooled liquid cooling, or heatpipe HSFs. However, while pumping heat, a Peltier module will typically consume more electric power than the heat amount being pumped.
