= NASA AI Assisted-Air Quality Monitoring Project =

1988 project for a Space Shuttle system

- Mission statement: Demonstrate the feasibility of a mass spectrometer-based intelligent systems manager for monitoring the life support system and chemical producing experiments
- Type of project: Prototype development and testing project
- Products: Expert system based diagnostic software, source code for operations of mass spectrometer
- Location: University of Florida
- Owner: NASA Ames Research Center, Information Sciences Division
- Key people: Carla M. Wong, NASA Ames Research Center; Richard A. Yost, University of Florida; Michael Story, Finnigan MAT Corp; Syed Shariq, NASA Joint Enterprise Institute
- Established: 1988
- Closed: 1990

The NASA Expert-System Ion Trap Mass Spectrometer (ES-ITMS) Project was a public-private partnership to develop an artificial intelligence assisted, air quality monitoring system and was qualified for use on the Space Shuttle. The partnership was also the first cost and intellectual property shared public-partnership implemented by NASA, which used the commercial Research and Development Limited Partnership (RDLP) model that had been adopted by the Reagan Administration for Department of Defense semiconductor development, and recommended for use by NASA for space commercialization. The project partners included NASA, the University of Florida and Finnigan MAT Corporation, was organized and administered by the NASA Joint Enterprise Institute (subsequently NASA Joint Sponsored Program) and ran from 1988 through 1990. The partnership concluded final testing in 1991, generating four patents, expert system software and application protocol reports. The system was space qualified for use on the Shuttle and elements of the ES-ITMS system were integrated into the product Improvements for Finnigan MAT corporation. The success of the partnership lead NASA to create a pilot program to develop partnership business models as an ongoing management practice.

== Purpose and objectives ==
The need to monitor air quality in confined spaces represented an increasing challenge for NASA's planned space missions and private sector facility managers facing the increased scrutiny of possible air contaminants. Up to the early 1980's, air quality monitors generally required large spaces and human technicians to interpret readings. This created a need for miniaturized air quality monitors that could generate reliable and accurate analytic results without on-site technician presence.

NASA initiated projects to develop..."mobile and/or portable mass spectrometers" that evaluated the "tradeoff between instrumentation capabilities and space, weight and power considerations." NASA selected a "commercial ITMS instrument capable of generating electron ionization, chemical ionization and mass spectrometry data", to develop a linked expert system to accomplish analysis without human intervention.

The commercial instrumentation was from Finnigan MAT corporation while the scientific expertise to support expert system development was available at the University of Florida.

The project managers at NASA Ames created a single, integrated project using the RDLP model with objectives to:

- Develop AI/expert system software for instrument control (NASA's role)
- Expand sensitivity, selectivity and speed of the spectrometer (Univ Florida role)
- Expand the spectrometer analytic capability and automate the screening (Finnigan role)

== Membership ==
The partnership included seven specialists from five member organizations:

- Federal Government
  - National Aeronautics and Space Administration (NASA)
  - NASA Ames Research Center (ARC)
  - NASA Kennedy Space Center (KSC)
- Commercial
  - Finnigan MAT Corporation (Thermo-Fisher Scientific)
  - TGS Technology, Inc.
- Research Management
  - University of Florida

== Organization, management and administration ==
The technical project was organized into two development teams, one located in at the NASA Ames Research Center covering expert systems and analytic capabilities and one in Florida covering improved sensitivity and testing.

The partnership management and administration was provided by a non-profit, partnership support organization: the Joint Enterprise Institute operating through San Francisco State University Foundation (SFSUF) with a NASA employee liaison, Syed Shariq.

== Public-private partnership ==
The partnership structure was as a prototype test of a pilot NASA program to develop public-private partnership business models. The pilot program was known as the NASA Joint Sponsored Research Program (JSRP), which operated as the NASA Joint Enterprise Institute between 1988 and 1991. The partnership was the first public-private, research and development partnership implemented by NASA in response to national policy shifts to increase technology transfer and space commercialization. The partnership structure included a two year technology development and testing plan that cost $610,000, of which NASA funded $310,000, Finnigan $175,000 and the University of Florida $95,000.

== Results and commercialization ==
The project generated patents (4), software (2) and application protocol reports (8). NASA gained use of the patents and jointly development software while Finnigan received commercial utilization rights. The results were commercialized within eighteen months of project completion.

== Recognition ==
NASA recognized the project as a space qualified instrument. Its achievements were reported to the NASA Administrator, directly leading to establishment of the agency-wide Joint Sponsored Research Program.

== See also ==
- Mass Spectrometry
- Miniaturized Mass Spectrometer
- Ion Trap
- Human Presence in Space
- NASA Joint Sponsored Research Program
