= Rotorcraft Industry Technology Association =

Rotorcraft Industry Technology Association (RITA)
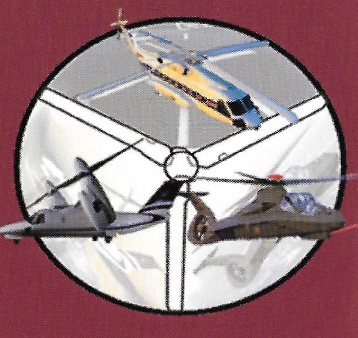
- Successor: Vertical List Consortium
- Formation: 1995
- Founded at: Menlo Park, CA
- Type: Industry Research and Development Consortium
- Legal status: Non-profit, 501(c)(3)
- Purpose: Maintain US preeminence in rotorcraft technology through industry and government collaborative R&D and technology transfer
- Headquarters: Easton, MD
- Members: Seventeen vehicle manufacturers, suppliers and research organizations
- Key people: John Ward- RITA, Executive Director Eric Brachausen- American Technology Alliances (AmTech)

The Rotorcraft Industry Technology Association (RITA) was a non-profit organization formed by the rotorcraft industry to collaborate with the U.S. Federal government through the National Rotorcraft Technology Center (NRTC)—a joint initiative of NASA, the Army, the Navy and the Federal Aviation Administration (FAA). Based at NASA Ames Research Center, the NRTC aimed to streamline government-industry collaboration in developing dual-use rotorcraft technologies for military and civilian applications. The NRTC was formed for a "..paradigm shift to a new way of doing business between government and industry emphasizing cooperation, streamlined processes and minimum infrastructure".

The NRTC required the rotorcraft industry to form an independent, single coordinating partner. To fulfill this, rotorcraft companies, in collaboration with the Vertical Flight Society, established the Rotorcraft Industry Technology Association (RITA).

RITA led to new technologies and certification guidelines, including health and usage monitoring, flight simulations in icing conditions, and lighter, more durable transmission systems.

== Charter and mission ==
RITA was chartered to undertake rotorcraft research and development within the US industry and with the US Federal government for both civilian and military use.

RITA's mission was to:

- Enhance international competitiveness of the U.S. rotorcraft industry
- Promote commercial rotorcraft applications in the United States
- Foster dual military and commercial use of advanced rotorcraft technology
- Ensure continued U.S. military rotorcraft superiority

== Membership ==
Membership was organized into three classes

Principal- Major rotorcraft US manufacturers

- Bell Helicopter Textron, Inc.
- Sikorsky Aircraft Corporation
- The Boeing Company

Supporting- All other US rotorcraft industry participants

- Allison Engine Co. (Successor company Allison Transmission)
- Smiths Group
- BF Goodrich AIS
- Simula Technology, Inc.
- Endevco Corporation

Associate- Non-profit associations and academic participants

- Georgia Institute of Technology
- Georgia Tech Research Institute
- Naval Postgraduate School
- Old Dominion University
- Rensselaer Polytechnic Institute
- University of Alabama
- University of Illinois at Chicago
- University of Maryland
- Pennsylvania State University

== Governance, management and administration ==
RITA was overseen by a three-member Board of Directors elected from its Principal and Supporting members. John Ward served as the initial executive director until 2000, when he was succeeded by C. Rande Vause. From 1995 to 2000, administrative support was provided by American Technology Alliances.

== Design, organization, launch, administration ==
RITA was designed, launched, and administered by American Technology Alliances (AmTech) as a project under NASA's JSR Program using Space Act Authority. Its structure included work teams organized by project topics and technology themes, collaborating with government and research personnel to develop shared intellectual property.

== NASA Joint Sponsored Research Project: public/private partnership ==
RITA was initiated in 1993 as a public/private partnership by the NASA Joint Sponsored Research Program at the request of NASA Ames management and rotorcraft program manager Joe Elliott at NASA Headquarters within the Aeronautics Directorate. RITA's purpose and relationship with NASA were formalized in a Cooperative Agreement established in August 1995, managed by Tom Snyder at NASA Ames Research Center. The program used NASA's Space Act Authority to enter into cost-sharing agreements for dual-use technology development. Funding came through the Cooperative Agreement, while the public-private partnership was governed by a Memorandum of Understanding.

== Technology thrusts and topics ==
RITA organized its research and development around five technology "thrusts," each defined as a key goal to pursue.

- Process and Product Improvement
- Enhanced Rotorcraft Performance
- Passenger & Community Acceptance
- Expanded Rotorcraft Operations
- Technologies to Support Harmonized Civil Certification & Military Qualification

Each technology thrust included one or more of eight R&D sectors that defined the scope of specific projects.

- Aeromechanics
- Structures and materials
- Composites Development, Structures and Materials
- Design and Manufacturing Technology Integration
- Manufacturing Technologies
- Crew Station, Avionics Integration
- Subsystems Technologies
- Operations and Certification

== Results ==
By fiscal year 1999, RITA had undertaken 94 projects in collaboration with the NRTC. Together, they invested $74.8 million in joint research, evenly split between RITA's commercial members and NRTC's federal partners.

== Awards ==
RITA received the 1998 Grover E. Bell award from the Vertical Flight Society for its work on Health and Usage Monitoring System (HUMS), and the 2003 Robert L. Pinckney Award for advances in High Speed Machining of Titanium.

== Transition to Vertical Lift Consortium ==
RITA changed its name in 2005 to the Center for Rotorcraft Innovation (CRI) and moved its principal office first to Connecticut and subsequently to the Philadelphia area while changing the charter and scope of activities to focus on military research and development in alignment with G.W. Bush Administration policy. The organization subsequently changed the name to Vertical Lift Consortium (VLC) and moved to Summerville, South Carolina for management and administration by Advanced Technology International (ATI).

== See also ==
- Vertical Flight Society
- Bell Textron
- Boeing
- Sikorsky Aircraft
- AGATE Alliance
