= The National Council for Public-Private Partnerships =

- Type: The National Council for Public-Private Partnerships (NCPPP)
- Industry: Non-Profit, Educational, 501 (c) 3
- Genre: Public-Private Partnership Education and Advocacy
- Founded: May 1985
- Defunct: December 2020
- Headquarters: Washington, DC
- Services: To advocate and facilitate the formation of public-private partnerships

The National Council for Public-Private Partnerships, Inc. (NCPPP) was an educational non-profit chartered to.."advocate and facilitate the formation of public-private partnerships at the Federal, state and local levels." The Council compiled and disseminated information about US Federal, state and local public-private partnership and privatization models and methods through publications, conferences and case studies. The models were adopted and applied for ground transportation, water infrastructure and facilities development.

== History ==
The NCPPP (the "Council") was formed in 1985 from a meeting of public and private sector transportation officials to provide a non-partisan, non-profit venue for collecting and exchanging information about shared financing of transportation infrastructure. The Council expanded scope, adopted a new strategy and updated ByLaws in 2000 to add programs for real estate and water infrastructure development. The Council also test piloted a forum for Federal Technology Partnerships.

== Purpose: Vision, Mission and Objective ==
The Council adopted an updated statement of purpose in 2000

- Mission: To advocate and facilitate the formation of public-private partnerships at the federal, state and local levels, where appropriate, and to raise the awareness of governments and businesses of the means by which their cooperation can cost effectively provide the public with quality goods, services and facilities.
- Objectives:
  - To serve as an advocate of public-private partnerships.
  - To provide complete, objective, timely and useful information on the utilization of public-private partnerships to provide services and facilities to the general public.
  - To facilitate communications between public- and private sector members with respect to issues related to the implementation of public-private partnerships.
  - To conduct educational, training and other activities on public-private partnerships.
  - To provide input to the public dialogue in support of the use of public-private partnerships and removal of impediments to their implementation.
  - To facilitate an international dialogue on public-private partnerships in support of the foregoing objectives.
- Key Values
  - Full and open participation by public and private members and encouragement of frank communication between the public and private sectors.
  - Assistance to both the public and private sectors in public-private partnership analysis and implementation.
  - Promotion of member teamwork in fulfilling the Council's mission and achieving its objectives as a non-profit, non-partisan organization.

== Participation and governance ==
Membership was open to US domiciled public and private sector organizations. Public Sector Members were defined as "...any kind that are public agencies or not-for-profit organizations" and Private Sector Members were defined as "..for-profit businesses or organizations".

Membership was offered at two levels: Sponsors and General Members.

Sponsor memberships were limited to private businesses, public agencies and other organizations willing and able to make a significant contribution determined by the Management Committee. General Memberships were offered to all other eligible entities and organizations.

The Council was governed by a Board of Directors composed of the Sponsor level members, who elected a Chair, President and President-elect to lead an Executive Committee composed of at-large and functional leads, such as information or marketing. The 2002 Executive Committee was composed of fifteen members. The Board and Executive Committee selected an Executive Director who was responsible for implementing the Council's strategy and business plan.

== Programs: Institutes and conferences ==
The Council organized activities into domain areas of expertise designated "Institutes". Education and training was disseminated through national and regional scale conferences. The working Institutes were supported by a management, communications and events team at the Council's headquarters. New initiatives were tested through smaller gatherings designated "forums".

Institutes

- Real Estate
- Transportation
- Water

Forum

- Federal Technology Partnering

== Dissolution closure ==
The Board of Directors and leading sponsors voted to close NCPPP in November 2020 due to a drop in membership renewal leading "...lack of fundraising ability in light of COVID-19 environment."

== Legacy ==
The US Federal Transit Administration maintains an information website of the Council's transportation scoped workshops. Members from the Council's energy, transportation and water infrastructure Institutes joined a new, non-profit organization, The Association for Improvement in American Infrastructure (AIAI) that provides information and education resources about public-private partnerships.

== See also ==
- Public–private partnership
- Public–private partnerships by country
- Privatization
- Government procurement
- Build–operate–transfer
- NASA Joint Sponsored Research Program
