= Wind tunnel =

Machine used for studying the effects of air moving around objects

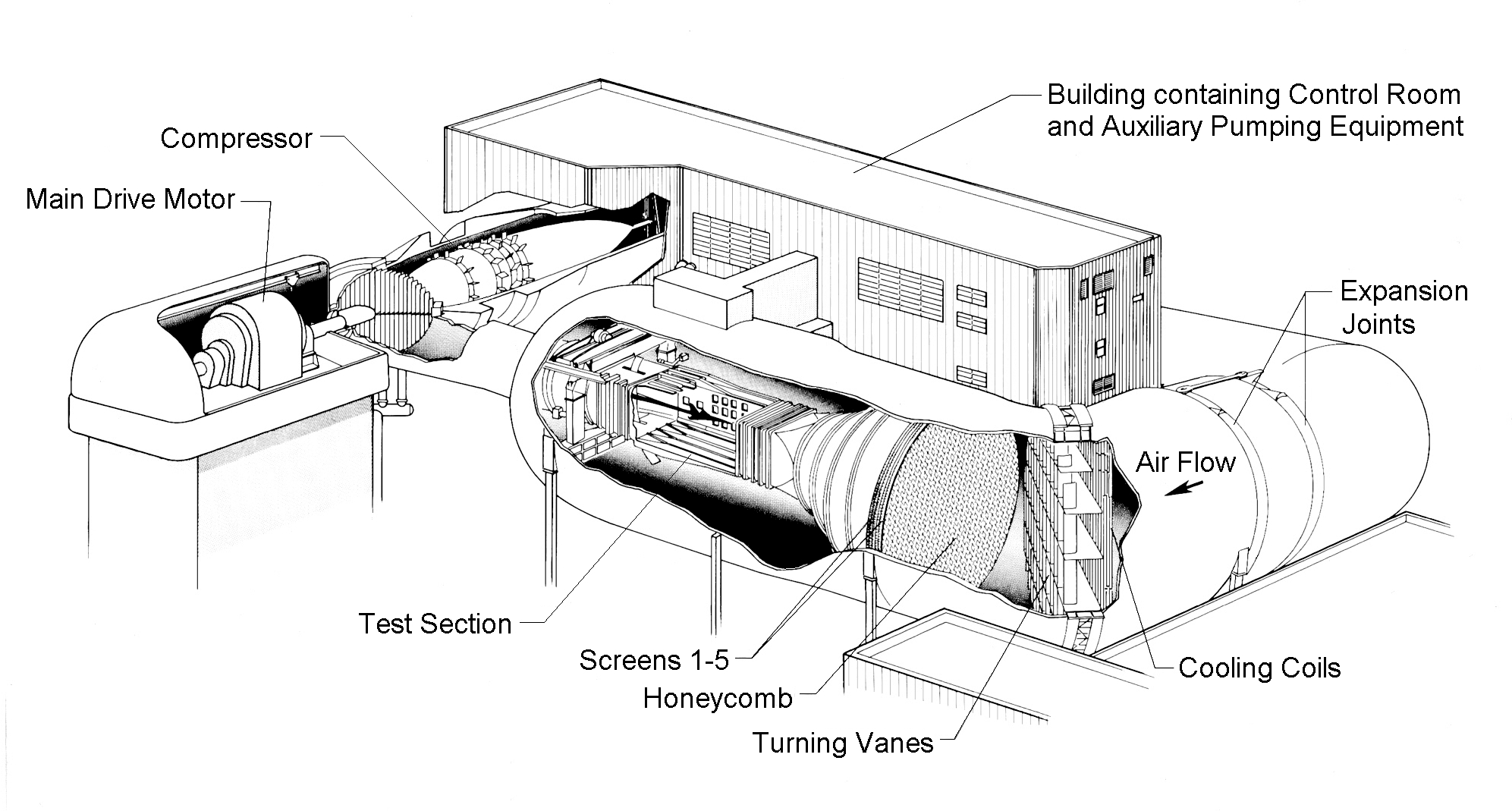
A sample wind tunnel layout showing some typical features including a test section and control room, a machine for pumping air continuously through ducting, and a nozzle for setting the test airspeed.

A wind tunnel is "an apparatus for producing a controlled stream of air for conducting aerodynamic experiments". The experiment is conducted in the test section of the wind tunnel and a complete tunnel configuration includes air ducting to and from the test section and a device for keeping the air in motion, such as a fan. Wind tunnel uses include assessing the effects of air on an aircraft in flight or a ground vehicle moving on land, and measuring the effect of wind on buildings and bridges. Wind tunnel test sections range in size from less than a foot across, to over 100 feet (30 m), and with air speeds from a light breeze to hypersonic.

The earliest wind tunnels were invented towards the end of the 19th century, in the early days of aeronautical research, as part of the effort to develop heavier-than-air flying machines. The wind tunnel reversed the usual situation. Instead of the air standing still and an aircraft moving, an object would be held still and the air moved around it. In this way, a stationary observer could study the flying object in action, and could measure the aerodynamic forces acting on it.

The development of wind tunnels accompanied the development of the airplane. Large wind tunnels were built during World War II, and as supersonic aircraft were developed, supersonic wind tunnels were constructed to test them. Wind tunnel testing was considered of strategic importance during the Cold War for development of aircraft and missiles.

Advances in computational fluid dynamics (CFD) have reduced the demand for wind tunnel testing, but have not eliminated it. Many real-world problems can still not be modeled accurately enough by CFD to eliminate the need for wind tunnel testing. Moreover, confidence in a numerical simulation tool depends on comparing its results with experimental data, and these can be obtained, for example, from wind tunnel tests.

== Operation ==
A wind tunnel diagram which shows a fan drawing air past a model aircraft. The measurements taken from models are applicable to full-size objects.

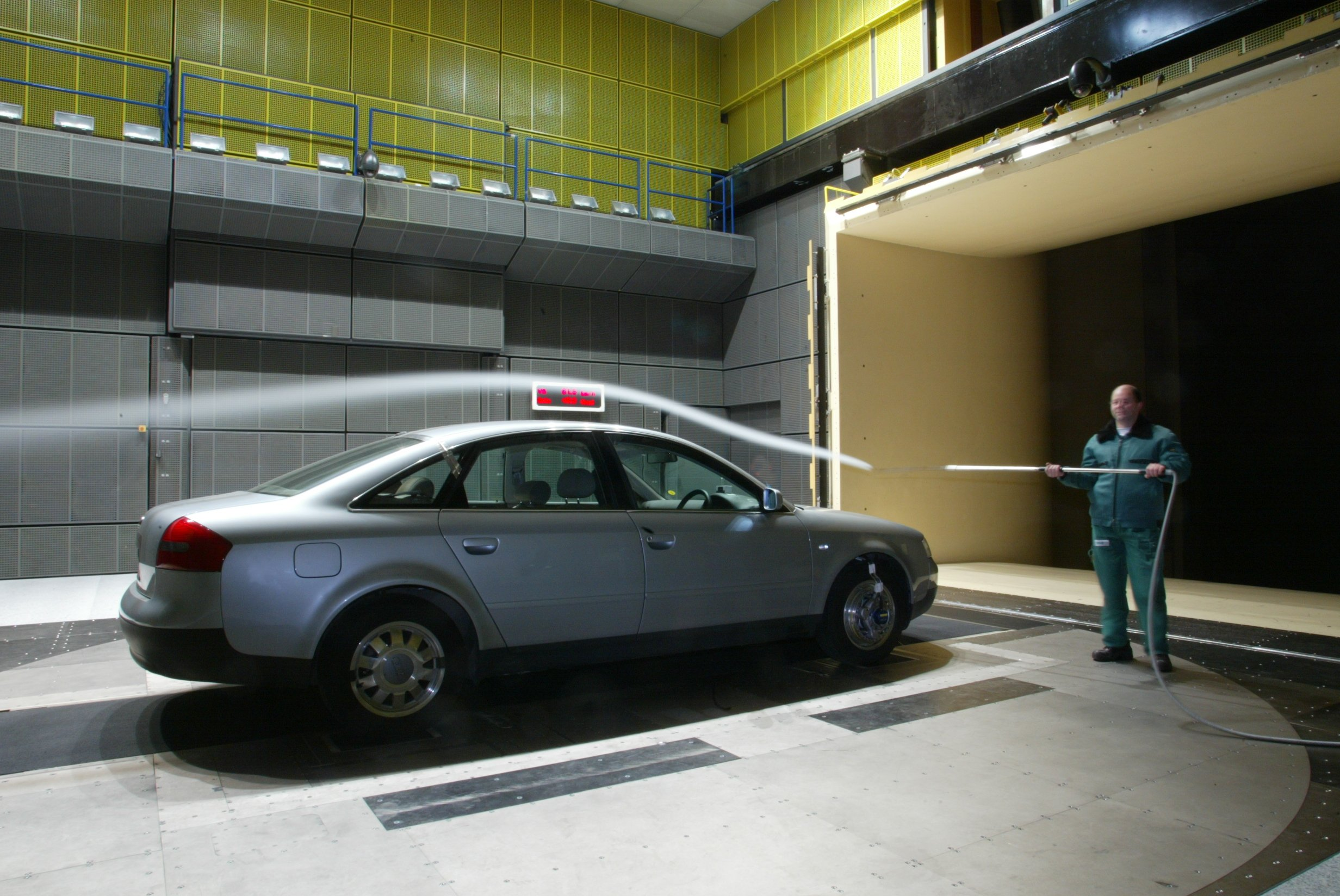
The effect of streamlining is made visible in a wind tunnel. Shaping the body to make it more streamlined reduces fuel consumption.

A wind tunnel creates an outdoor environment in a controlled indoor setting which enables measurements of wind forces on a moving object to be taken while the object is stationary. This is much cheaper and more convenient than getting measurements while the object is moving.

The object being tested, such as a scale model of an aircraft, is placed in the test section and restrained from moving. Air is flowed around the object and the forces on the model are measured. The measurements taken from the reduced-scale model are applicable to the full-size aircraft. Testing of scale models of a new aircraft design before it flies is done to ensure the first flight will be safe with the aircraft behaving in a predictable manner. Research in wind tunnels produces accurate results and is done rapidly and economically compared to flight testing of full-scale aircraft.

Car fuel consumption is of secondary importance to drivers when starting and driving in extreme cold and wind-driven snow. This condition is investigated in a different kind of wind tunnel, the climatic wind tunnel. The test section subjects cars to a range of extreme environmental conditions to make sure the air conditioning can make the car comfortable on very hot and very cold days and can keep windows clear of condensation in very humid and cool weather.

== History ==
=== Origins ===
English mathematician and physicist Isaac Newton (1642–1726) displayed a forerunner to the modern wind tunnel in Proposition 36/37 of his book Philosophiæ Naturalis Principia Mathematica.

English military engineer and mathematician Benjamin Robins (1707–1751) invented a whirling arm apparatus to determine drag and did some of the first experiments in aerodynamics.

Sir George Cayley (1773–1857) also used a whirling arm to measure the drag and lift of various airfoils. His whirling arm was 5 feet (1.5 m) long and attained speeds between 10 and 20 feet per second (3 to 6 m/s).

Otto Lilienthal used a rotating arm to make measurements on wing airfoils with varying angles of attack, establishing their lift-to-drag ratio polar diagrams, but was lacking the notions of induced drag and Reynolds numbers.

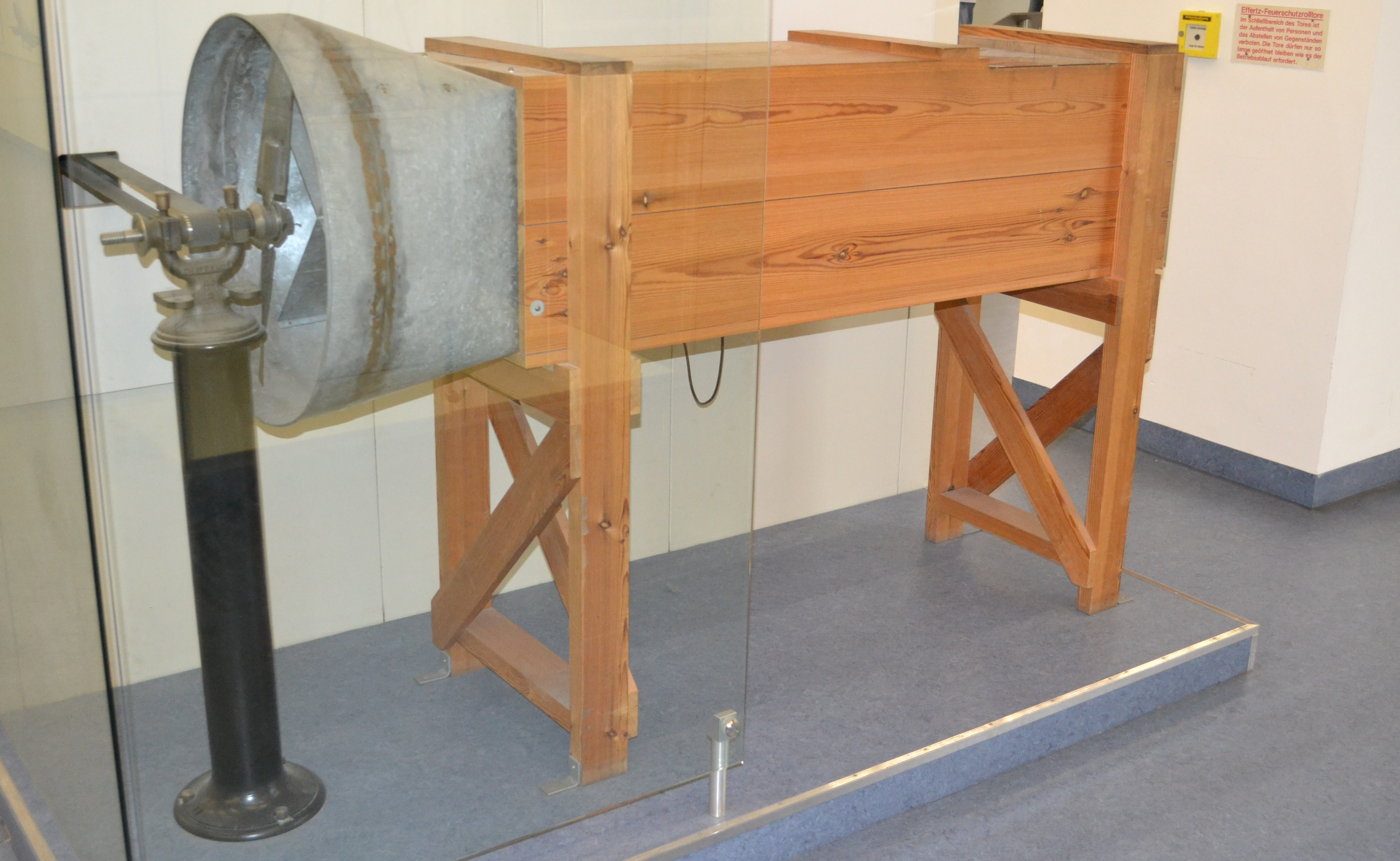
Replica of the Wright brothers' wind tunnel

Drawbacks of whirling arm tests are that they do not produce a reliable flow of air. Centrifugal forces and the fact that the object is moving in its own wake also mean that detailed examination of the airflow is difficult. Francis Herbert Wenham (1824–1908), a Council Member of the Aeronautical Society of Great Britain, addressed these issues by inventing, designing, and operating the first enclosed wind tunnel in 1871. Once this breakthrough had been achieved, detailed technical data was rapidly extracted by the use of this tool. Wenham and his colleague John Browning are credited with many fundamental discoveries, including the measurement of l/d ratios, and the revelation of the beneficial effects of a high aspect ratio.

Konstantin Tsiolkovsky built an open-section wind tunnel with a centrifugal blower in 1897, and determined the drag coefficients of flat plates, cylinders, and spheres.

Danish inventor Poul la Cour used wind tunnels to develop wind turbines in the early 1890s. Carl Rickard Nyberg used a wind tunnel to design his Flugan starting in 1897.

The Englishman Osborne Reynolds (1842–1912) of the University of Manchester demonstrated that the airflow pattern over a scale model would be the same for the full-scale vehicle if a certain flow parameter were the same in both cases. This parameter, now known as the Reynolds number, is used in the description of all fluid-flow situations, including the shape of flow patterns, the effectiveness of heat transfers, and the onset of turbulence. This comprises the central scientific justification for the use of models in wind tunnels to simulate real-life phenomena.

The Wright brothers' use of a simple wind tunnel in 1901 to study the effects of airflow over various shapes while developing their Wright Flyer was in some ways revolutionary. However, they were using the accepted technology of the day, though this was not yet a common technology in America.

In France, Gustave Eiffel (1832–1923) built his first open-return wind tunnel in 1909, powered by a 67 hp (50 kW) electric motor, at Champs-de-Mars, near the foot of the tower that bears his name.

Between 1909 and 1912 Eiffel ran about 4,000 tests in his wind tunnel, and his systematic experimentation set new standards for aeronautical research. In 1912 Eiffel's laboratory was moved to Auteuil, a suburb of Paris, where his wind tunnel with a 7-foot (2 m) test section is still operational today. Eiffel significantly improved the efficiency of the open-return wind tunnel by enclosing the test section in a chamber, designing a flared inlet with a honeycomb flow straightener, and adding a diffuser between the test section and the fan located at the downstream end of the diffuser; this was an arrangement followed by a number of wind tunnels later built; in fact the open-return low-speed wind tunnel is often called the Eiffel-type wind tunnel.

=== Widespread usage ===
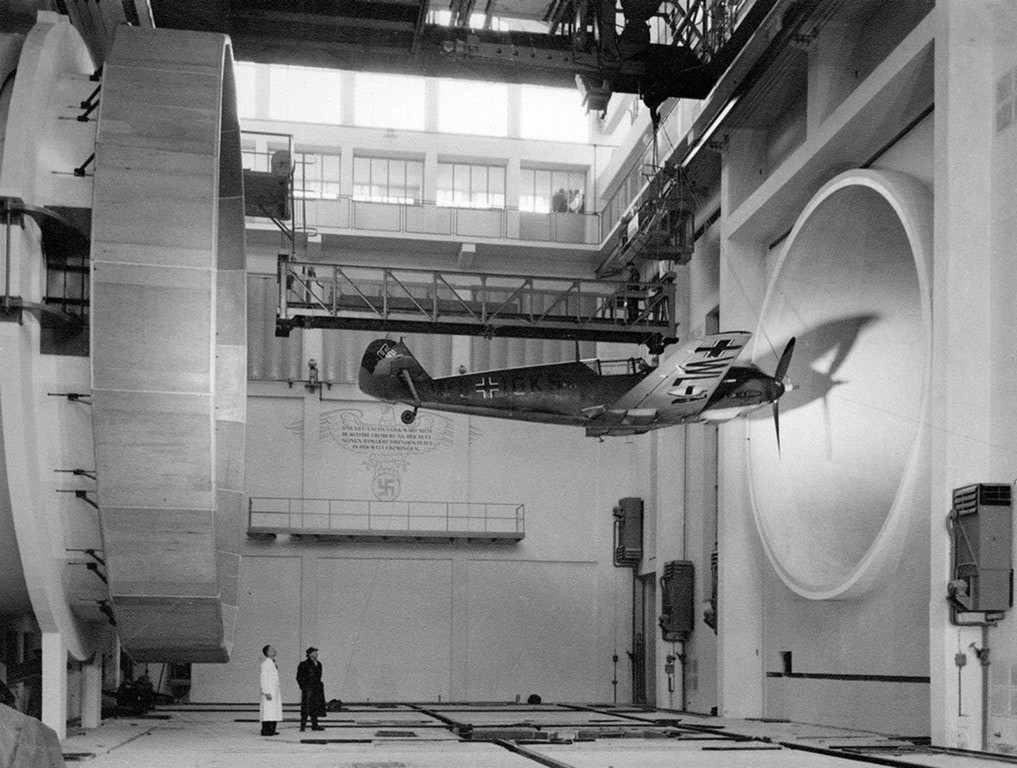
Herman Goering tunnel A3 commissioned in 1940 showing open test section with Messerschmitt Bf 109F installed for testing.

Subsequent use of wind tunnels proliferated as the science of aerodynamics and discipline of aeronautical engineering were established and air travel and power were developed.

The US Navy in 1916 built one of the largest wind tunnels in the world at that time at the Washington Navy Yard. The inlet was almost 11 feet (3.4 m) in diameter and the discharge part was 7 feet (2.1 m) in diameter. A 500 hp (370 kW) electric motor drove the paddle type fan blades.

In 1931 the NACA built a 30-by-60-foot (9.1 by 18.3 m) full-scale wind tunnel at Langley Research Center in Hampton, Virginia. The tunnel was powered by a pair of fans driven by 4,000 hp (3,000 kW) electric motors. The layout was a double-return, closed-loop format and could accommodate many full-size real aircraft as well as scale models. The tunnel was eventually closed and, even though it was declared a National Historic Landmark in 1995, demolition began in 2010.

Until World War II, the world's largest wind tunnel, built in 1932–1934, was located in a suburb of Paris, Chalais-Meudon, France. It was designed to test full-size aircraft and had six large fans driven by high powered electric motors. The Chalais-Meudon wind tunnel was used by ONERA under the name S1Ch until 1976 in the development of, e.g., the Caravelle and Concorde airplanes. Today, this wind tunnel is preserved as a national monument.

Ludwig Prandtl was Theodore von Kármán's teacher at Göttingen University and suggested the construction of a wind tunnel for tests of airships they were designing. The vortex street of turbulence downstream of a cylinder was tested in the tunnel. When he later moved to Aachen University he recalled use of this facility:

I remembered the wind tunnel in Göttingen was started as a tool for studies of Zeppelin behavior, but that it had proven to be valuable for everything else from determining the direction of smoke from a ship's stack, to whether a given airplane would fly. Progress at Aachen, I felt, would be virtually impossible without a good wind tunnel.

When von Kármán began to consult with Caltech he worked with Clark Millikan and Arthur L. Klein. He objected to their design and insisted on a return flow making the device "independent of the fluctuations of the outside atmosphere". It was completed in 1930 and used for Northrop Alpha testing.

In 1939 General Arnold asked what was required to advance the USAF, and von Kármán answered, "The first step is to build the right wind tunnel." On the other hand, after the successes of the Bell X-2 and prospect of more advanced research, he wrote, "I was in favor of constructing such a plane because I have never believed that you can get all the answers out of a wind tunnel."

=== World War II ===
In 1941 the US constructed one of the largest wind tunnels at that time at Wright Field in Dayton, Ohio. This wind tunnel starts at 45 feet (14 m) and narrows to 20 feet (6.1 m) in diameter. Two 40-foot (12 m) fans were driven by a 40,000 hp (30,000 kW) electric motor. Large scale aircraft models could be tested at air speeds of 400 mph (640 km/h).

During WWII, Germany developed different designs of large wind tunnels to further their knowledge of aeronautics. For example, the wind tunnel at Peenemünde was a novel wind tunnel design that allowed for high-speed airflow research, but brought several design challenges regarding constructing a high-speed wind tunnel at scale. However, it successfully used some large natural caves which were increased in size by excavation and then sealed to store large volumes of air which could then be routed through the wind tunnels. By the end of the war, Germany had at least three different supersonic wind tunnels, with one capable of Mach 4.4 heated airflows.

A large wind tunnel under construction near Oetztal, Austria would have had two fans directly driven by two 50,000 hp (37,000 kW) hydraulic turbines. The installation was not completed by the end of the war and the dismantled equipment was shipped to Modane, France in 1946 where it was re-erected and is still operated there by the ONERA. With its 26-foot (8 m) test section and airspeed up to Mach 1, it is the largest transonic wind tunnel facility in the world. Frank Wattendorf reported on this wind tunnel for a US response.

On 22 June 1942, Curtiss-Wright financed construction of one of the nation's largest subsonic wind tunnels in Buffalo, New York. The first concrete for building was poured on 22 June 1942 on a site that eventually would become Calspan, where the wind tunnel still operates.

By the end of World War II, the US had built eight new wind tunnels, including the largest one in the world at Moffett Field near Sunnyvale, California, which was designed to test full size aircraft at speeds of less than 250 mph (400 km/h) and a vertical wind tunnel at Wright Field, Ohio, where the wind stream is upwards for the testing of models in spin situations and the concepts and engineering designs for the first primitive helicopters flown in the US.

=== After World War II ===
NACA wind tunnel test on a human subject, showing the effects of high wind speeds on the human face

Later research into airflows near or above the speed of sound used a related approach. Metal pressure chambers were used to store high-pressure air which was then accelerated through a nozzle designed to provide supersonic flow. The observation or instrumentation chamber ("test section") was then placed at the proper location in the throat or nozzle for the desired airspeed.

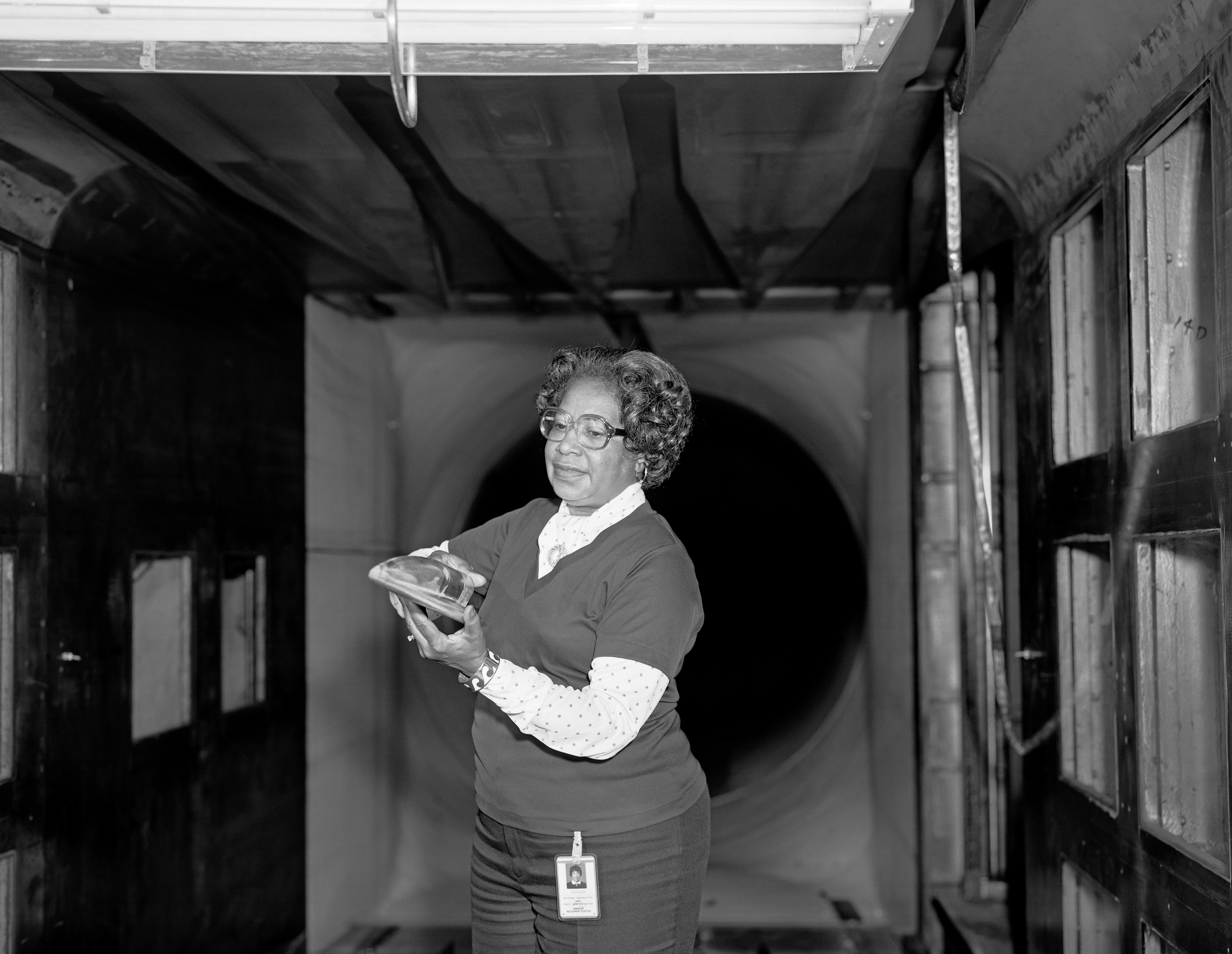
Mary Jackson with a wind tunnel model at Langley Research Center

In the United States, concern over the lagging of American research facilities compared to those built by the Germans led to the Unitary Wind Tunnel Plan Act of 1949, which authorized expenditure to construct new wind tunnels at universities and at government sites. Some German war-time wind tunnels were dismantled for shipment to the United States as part of the plan to exploit German technological developments.

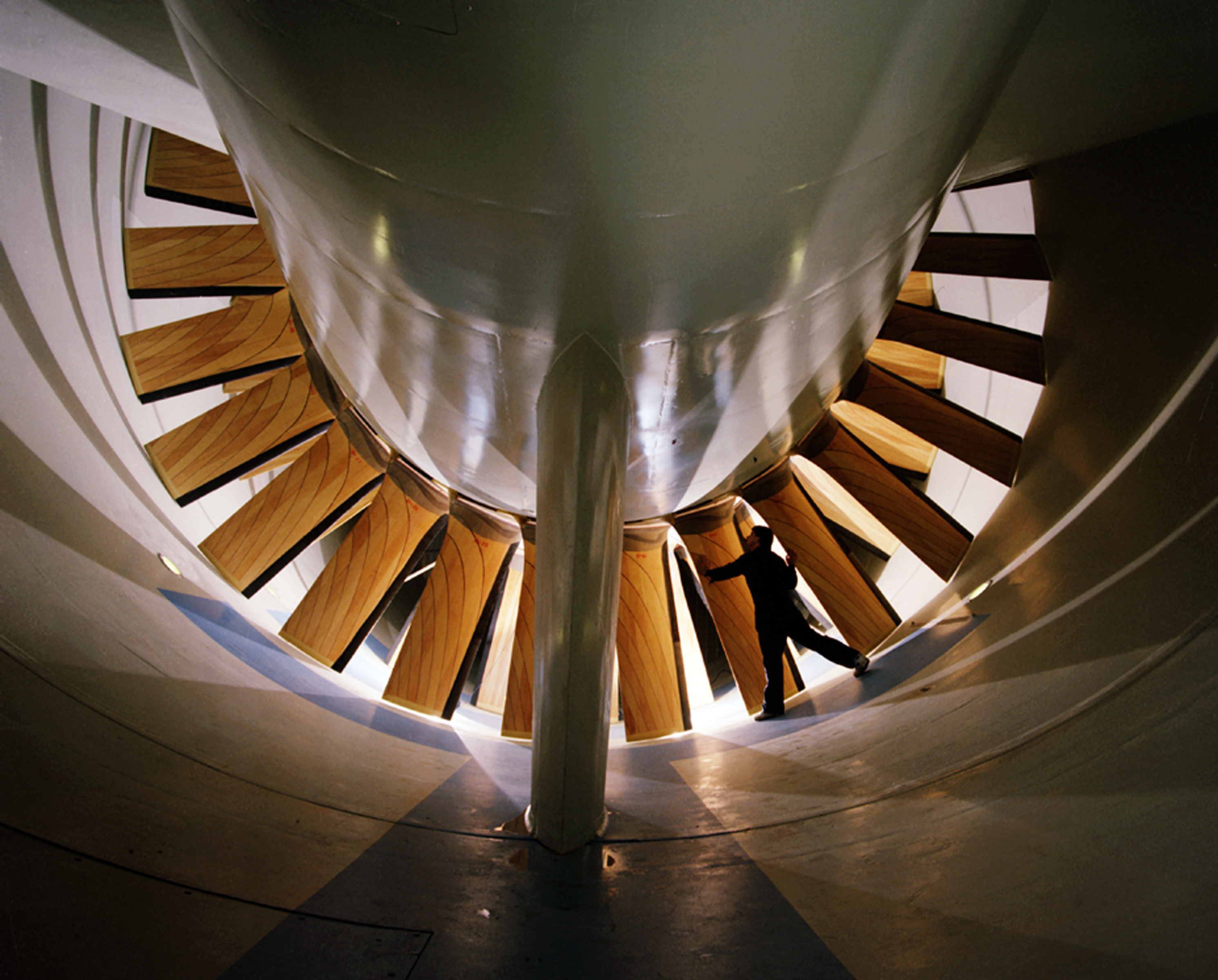
Fan blades of Langley Research Center's 16-foot transonic wind tunnel in 1990, before it was retired in 2004

In the United States, many wind tunnels have been decommissioned from 1990 to 2010, including some historic facilities. Pressure is brought to bear on remaining wind tunnels due to declining or erratic usage, high electricity costs, and in some cases the high value of the real estate upon which the facility sits. On the other hand, CFD validation still requires wind-tunnel data, and this is likely to be the case for the foreseeable future. Studies have been done and others are underway to assess future military and commercial wind tunnel needs, but the outcome remains uncertain. More recently an increasing use of jet-powered, instrumented unmanned vehicles, or research drones, have replaced some of the traditional uses of wind tunnels. The world's fastest wind tunnel as of 2019 is the LENS-X wind tunnel, located in Buffalo, New York.

== Measurement of aerodynamic forces and moments ==
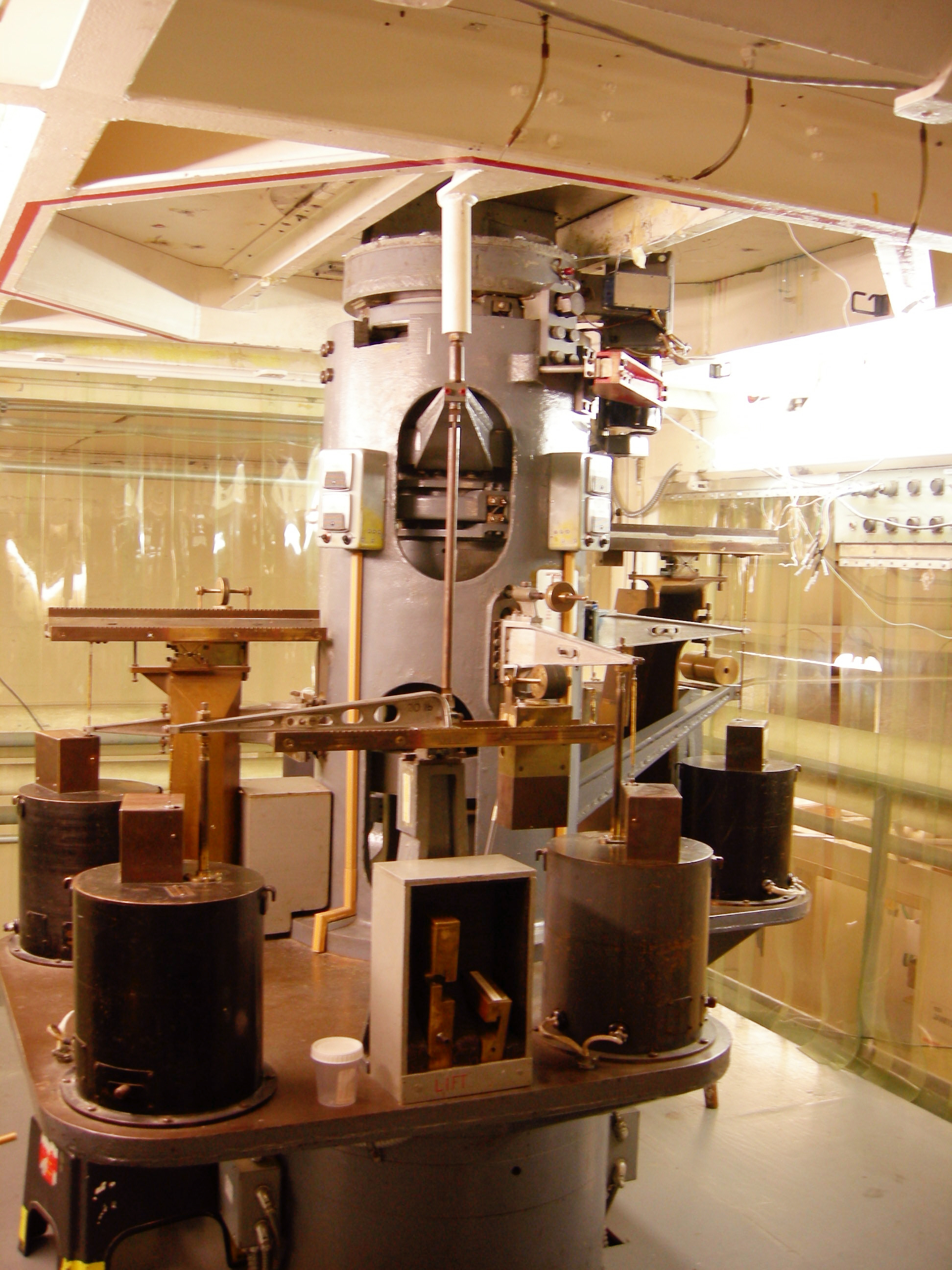
Six-element external balance below the Kirsten Wind Tunnel. Six measurements are required, three forces and three moments.

Air speed, direction and pressures are measured in several ways in wind tunnels.

Air speed through the test section is determined by Bernoulli's principle. The direction of airflow around a model is shown by fluttering tufts of yarn attached to the aerodynamic surfaces. The direction of airflow approaching and leaving a surface can be seen by mounting tufts in the airflow in front of and behind the model. Smoke or bubbles of liquid can be introduced into the airflow upstream of the model, and their paths around the model recorded using photography (see particle image velocimetry).

Aerodynamic forces on the test model are measured with beam balances.

The pressure distribution on a test model has historically been measured by drilling small holes on the surface, and connecting them to manometers to measure the pressure at each hole. Pressure distributions can be measured more conveniently using pressure-sensitive paint, in which pressure is indicated by the fluorescence of the paint. They can also be measured with very small electronic pressure sensors mounted on a flexible strip which is attached to the model.

The aerodynamic properties of an object can vary for a scaled model. However, by observing certain similarity rules, a very satisfactory correspondence between the aerodynamic properties of a scaled model and a full-size object can be achieved. The choice of similarity parameters depends on the purpose of the test, but the most important conditions to satisfy are usually:

- Geometric similarity: all dimensions of the object must be proportionally scaled.
- Mach number: the ratio of the airspeed to the speed of sound should be identical for the scaled model and the actual object (having identical Mach number in a wind tunnel and around the actual object is not equal to having identical airspeeds).
- Reynolds number: the ratio of inertial forces to viscous forces should be kept. This parameter is difficult to satisfy with a scaled model and has led to development of pressurized and cryogenic wind tunnels in which the viscosity of the working fluid can be greatly changed to compensate for the reduced scale of the model.

In certain particular test cases, other similarity parameters must be satisfied, such as the Froude number.

=== Force and moment measurements ===
A typical lift coefficient versus angle of attack curve

The model is mounted on a balance which measures forces and moments. Lift, drag, and lateral forces, as well as yaw, roll, and pitching moments are measured over a range of angle of attack. Common curves such as lift coefficient versus angle of attack are produced.

The model must be held stationary, and these external supports create drag and potential turbulence that will affect the measurements. The supporting structures are kept as small as possible and aerodynamically shaped to minimize turbulence.

== Flow visualization ==
Because air is transparent, it is difficult to directly observe the air movement itself. Instead, multiple methods of both quantitative and qualitative flow visualization methods have been developed for testing in a wind tunnel.

=== Qualitative methods ===
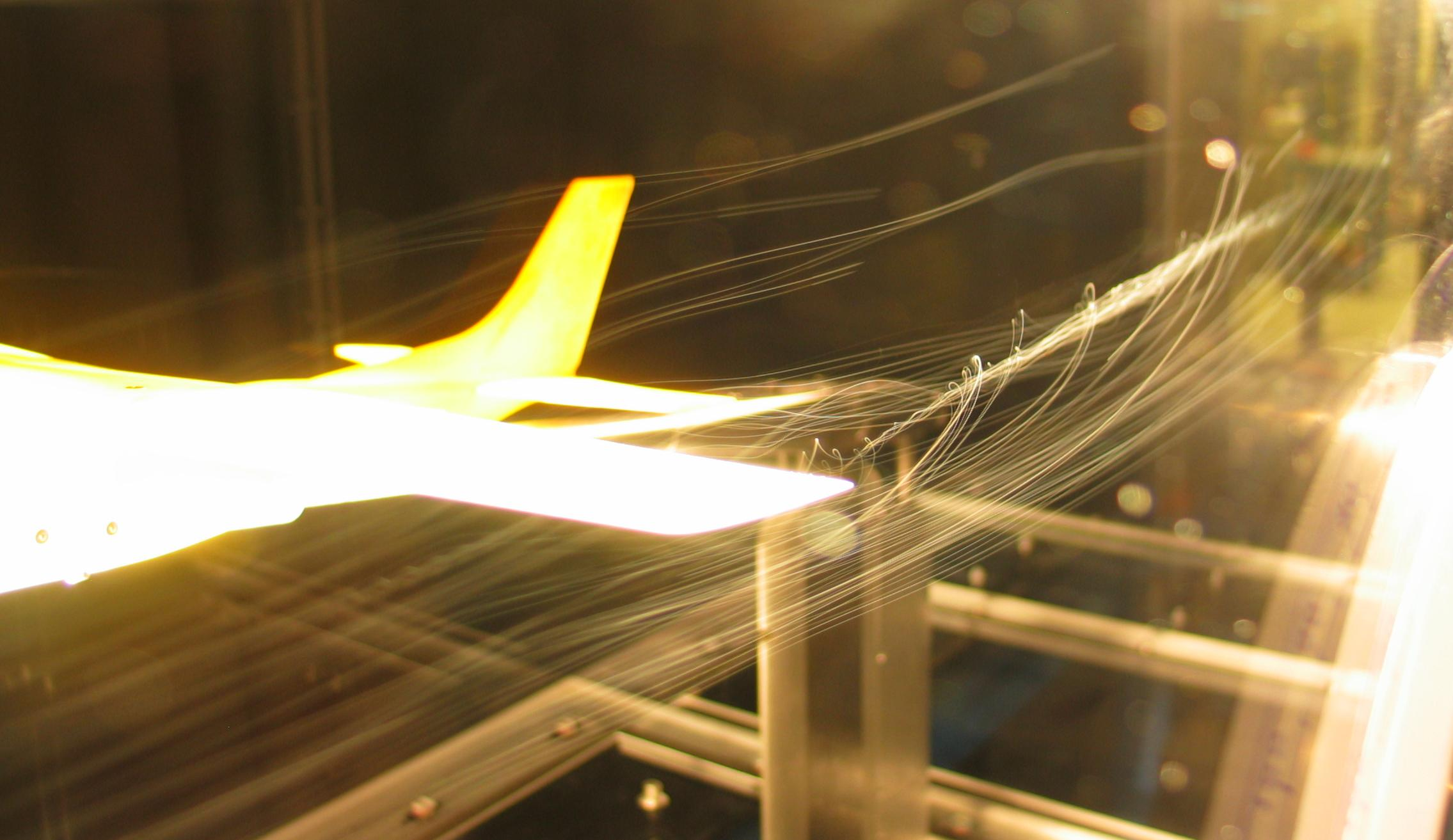
A scale model light aircraft showing helium-filled bubbles which follow pathlines of the wingtip vortices

- Smoke
- Carbon dioxide injection
- Tufts, mini-tufts, or flow cones can be applied to a model and remain attached during testing. Tufts can be used to gauge air flow patterns and flow separation. Tufts are sometimes made of fluorescent material and are illuminated under black light to aid in visualization. Tufts are also used on aircraft in flight. During flight-testing of the experimental rocket plane SpaceShipOne tufts were attached to the surface of the wings. No wind tunnel testing was done on the aircraft.
- Evaporating suspensions are simply a mixture of some sort or fine powder, talc, or clay mixed into a liquid with a low latent heat of evaporation. When the wind is turned on the liquid quickly evaporates, leaving behind the clay in a pattern characteristic of the air flow.
- Oil: When oil is applied to the model surface it can clearly show the transition from laminar to turbulent flow as well as flow separation.
- Tempera paint: Similar to oil, it can be applied to the surface of the model by initially applying the paint in spaced out dots. After running the wind tunnel, the flow direction and separation can be identified. An additional strategy in the use of tempera paint is to use blacklights to create a luminous flow pattern with the tempera paint.
- Fog (usually from water particles) is created with an ultrasonic piezoelectric nebulizer. The fog is transported inside the wind tunnel (preferably of the closed circuit and closed test section type). An electrically heated grid is inserted before the test section, which evaporates the water particles at its vicinity, thus forming fog sheets. The fog sheets function as streamlines over the test model when illuminated by a light sheet.
- Sublimation: If the air movement in the tunnel is sufficiently non-turbulent, a particle stream released into the airflow will not break up as the air moves along, but stay together as a sharp thin line. Multiple particle streams released from a grid of many nozzles can provide a dynamic three-dimensional shape of the airflow around a body. As with the force balance, these injection pipes and nozzles need to be shaped in a manner that minimizes the introduction of turbulent airflow into the airstream.
- Sublimation (alternate definition): A flow visualization technique is to coat the model in a sublimatable material where once the wind is turned on in regions where the airflow is laminar, the material will remain attached to the model, while conversely in turbulent areas the material will evaporate off of the model. This technique is primarily employed to verify that trip dots placed at the leading edge in order to force a transition are successfully achieving the intended goal.

High-speed turbulence and vortices can be difficult to see directly, but strobe lights and film cameras or high-speed digital cameras can help to capture events that are a blur to the naked eye.

High-speed cameras are also required when the subject of the test is itself moving at high speed, such as an airplane propeller. The camera can capture stop-motion images of how the blade cuts through the particulate streams and how vortices are generated along the trailing edges of the moving blade.

=== Quantitative methods ===
- Pressure-sensitive paint (PSP): the air pressure on a surface is measured with paint coatings which reacts to variations in pressure by changing color.
- Particle Image Velocimetry (PIV) and laser Doppler velocimetry: air velocity is measured with lasers.
- Model Deformation Measurement (MDM): measures how much a model bends and twists.

== Classification ==
There are many different kinds of wind tunnels. They are typically classified by the range of speeds that are achieved in the test section, as follows:

- Low-speed wind tunnel
- Subsonic and transonic wind tunnel
- Supersonic wind tunnel
- Hypersonic wind tunnel
- High enthalpy wind tunnel

Wind tunnels are also classified by the orientation of air flow in the test section with respect to gravity. Typically they are oriented horizontally, as happens during level flight. A different class of wind tunnels are oriented vertically so that gravity can be balanced by drag instead of lift, and these have become a popular form of recreation for simulating sky-diving:

- Vertical wind tunnel

Wind tunnels are also classified based on their main use. For those used with land vehicles such as cars and trucks the type of floor aerodynamics is also important. These vary from stationary floors through to full moving floors, with smaller moving floors and some attempt at boundary level control also being important.

=== Aeronautical wind tunnels ===
The main subcategories in the aeronautical wind tunnels are:

==== High Reynolds number tunnels ====
Reynolds number is one of the governing similarity parameters for the simulation of flow in a wind tunnel. For mach number less than 0.3, it is the primary parameter that governs the flow characteristics. There are three main ways to simulate high Reynolds number, since it is not practical to obtain full scale Reynolds number by use of a full scale vehicle.

- Pressurised tunnels: Test gases are pressurised to increase the Reynolds number.
- Heavy gas tunnels: Heavier gases like freon and R-134a are used as test gases. The transonic dynamics tunnel at NASA Langley is an example of such a tunnel.
- Cryogenic tunnels: Test gas is cooled down to increase the Reynolds number. The European transonic wind tunnel uses this technique.
- High-altitude tunnels: These are designed to test the effects of shock waves against various aircraft shapes in near vacuum. In 1952 the University of California constructed the first two high-altitude wind tunnels: one for testing objects at 50 to 70 miles (80 to 113 km) above the earth and the second for tests at 80 to 200 miles (130 to 320 km) above the earth.

==== V/STOL tunnels ====
V/STOL tunnels require large cross section area, but only small velocities. Since power varies with the cube of velocity, the power required for the operation is also less. An example of a V/STOL tunnel is the NASA Langley 14-by-22-foot (4.3 by 6.7 m) tunnel.

==== Tunnels with vertical airflow ====
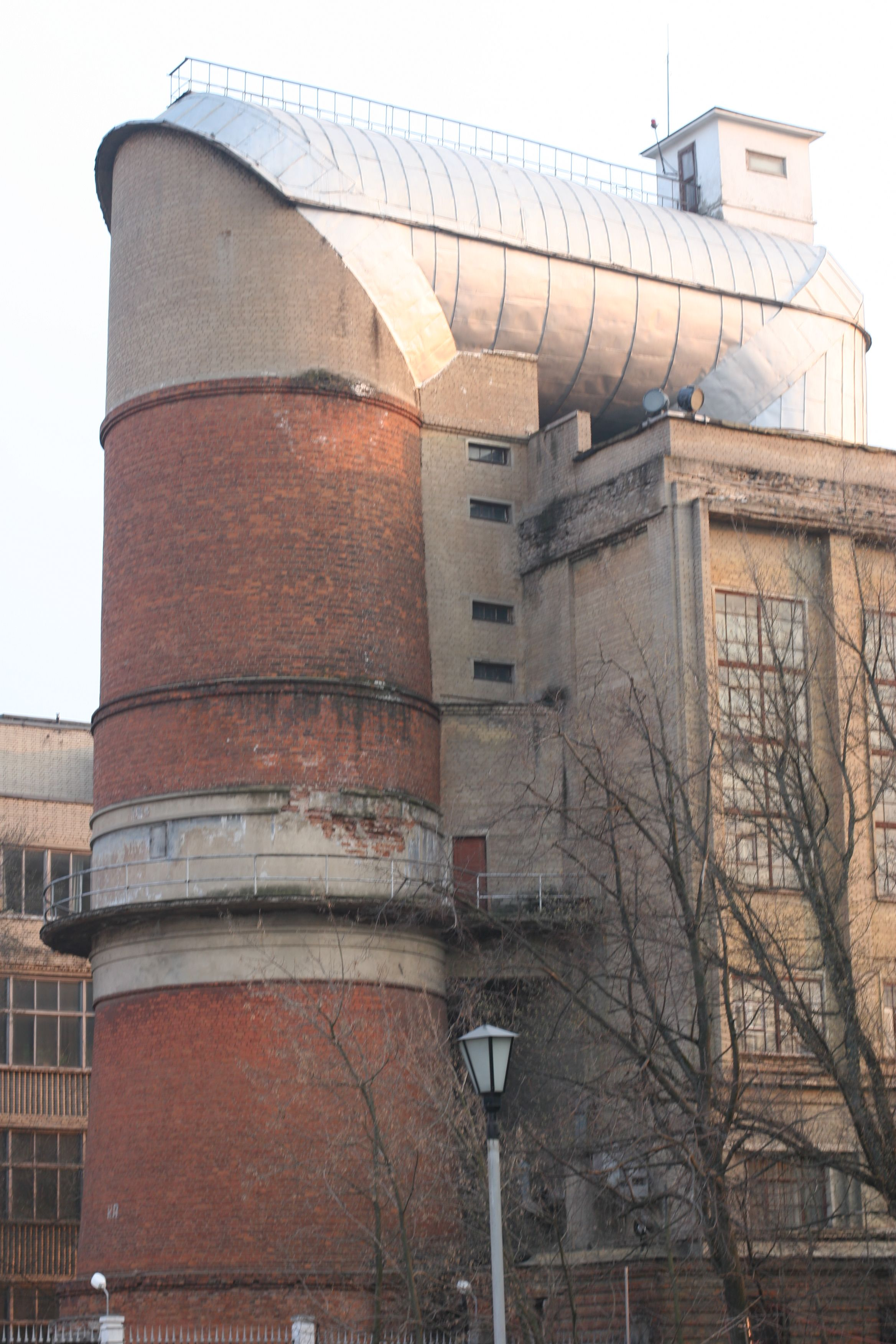
Vertical wind tunnel T-105 at Central Aerohydrodynamic Institute, Moscow, built in 1941 for aircraft testing

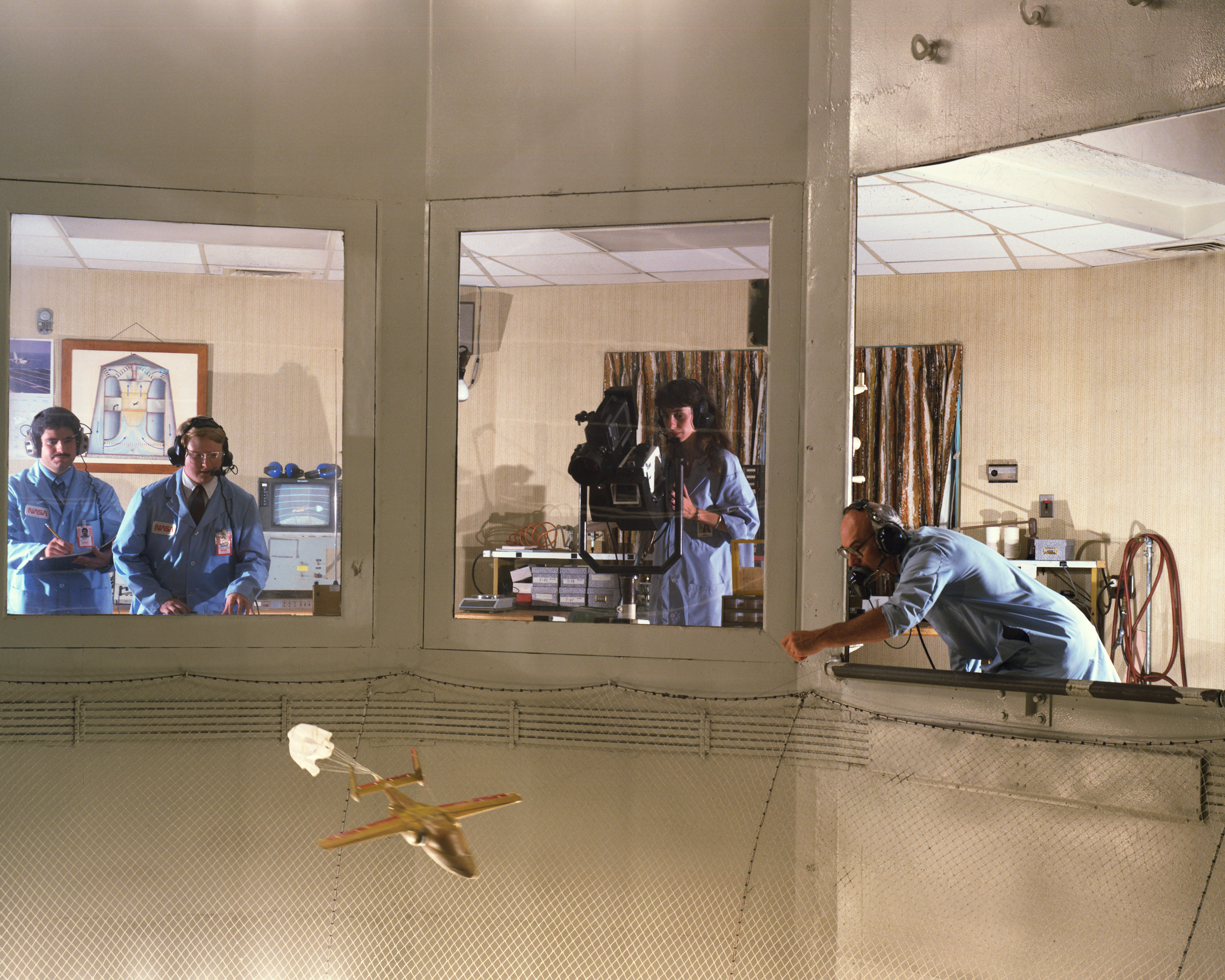
Model aircraft in a vertical tunnel showing parachute used to help recovery from a spin.

Vertical wind tunnels have a test section with air flowing upwards. Photography is used to record free-flight spin characteristics of aircraft models. Nets are installed above and below the test section to prevent the model from moving too high and to catch it when the air stops flowing.

=== Automotive tunnels ===
Automotive wind tunnels fall into two categories:

- those which are used to determine the aerodynamic coefficients of the vehicle,
- climatic tunnels that evaluate vehicle operability under a wide range of simulated environmental conditions including extreme cold, snow, solar loading and humidity.

Wind tunnel testing of automobiles began in the 1920s, on cars such as the Rumpler Tropfenwagen, and the Chrysler Airflow. Initially, scale models were tested, then larger wind tunnels were built to test full-scale cars with the capability to measure aerodynamic drag which enables improvements to be made for reducing fuel consumption. Wunibald Kamm built the first full-scale wind tunnel for motor vehicles.

=== Aeroacoustic tunnels ===
These tunnels are used in the studies of noise generated by flow and its suppression.

=== High enthalpy ===
A high enthalpy wind tunnel is intended to study flow of air around objects moving at speeds much faster than the local speed of sound (hypersonic speeds). "Enthalpy" is the total energy of a gas stream, composed of internal energy due to temperature, the product of pressure and volume, and the velocity of flow. Duplication of the conditions of hypersonic flight requires large volumes of high-pressure, heated air; large pressurized hot reservoirs, and electric arcs, are two techniques used.

=== Aquadynamic flume ===
The aerodynamic principles of the wind tunnel work equally on watercraft, except the water is more viscous and so sets greater forces on the object being tested. A looping flume is typically used for underwater aquadynamic testing. The interaction between two different types of fluids means that pure wind tunnel testing is only partly relevant. However, a similar sort of research is done in a towing tank.

=== Low-speed oversize liquid testing ===
Air is not always the best test medium for studying small-scale aerodynamic principles, due to the speed of the air flow and airfoil movement. A study of fruit fly wings designed to understand how the wings produce lift was performed using a large tank of mineral oil and wings 100 times larger than actual size, in order to slow down the wing beats and make the vortices generated by the insect wings easier to see and understand.

=== Environmental wind tunnels ===
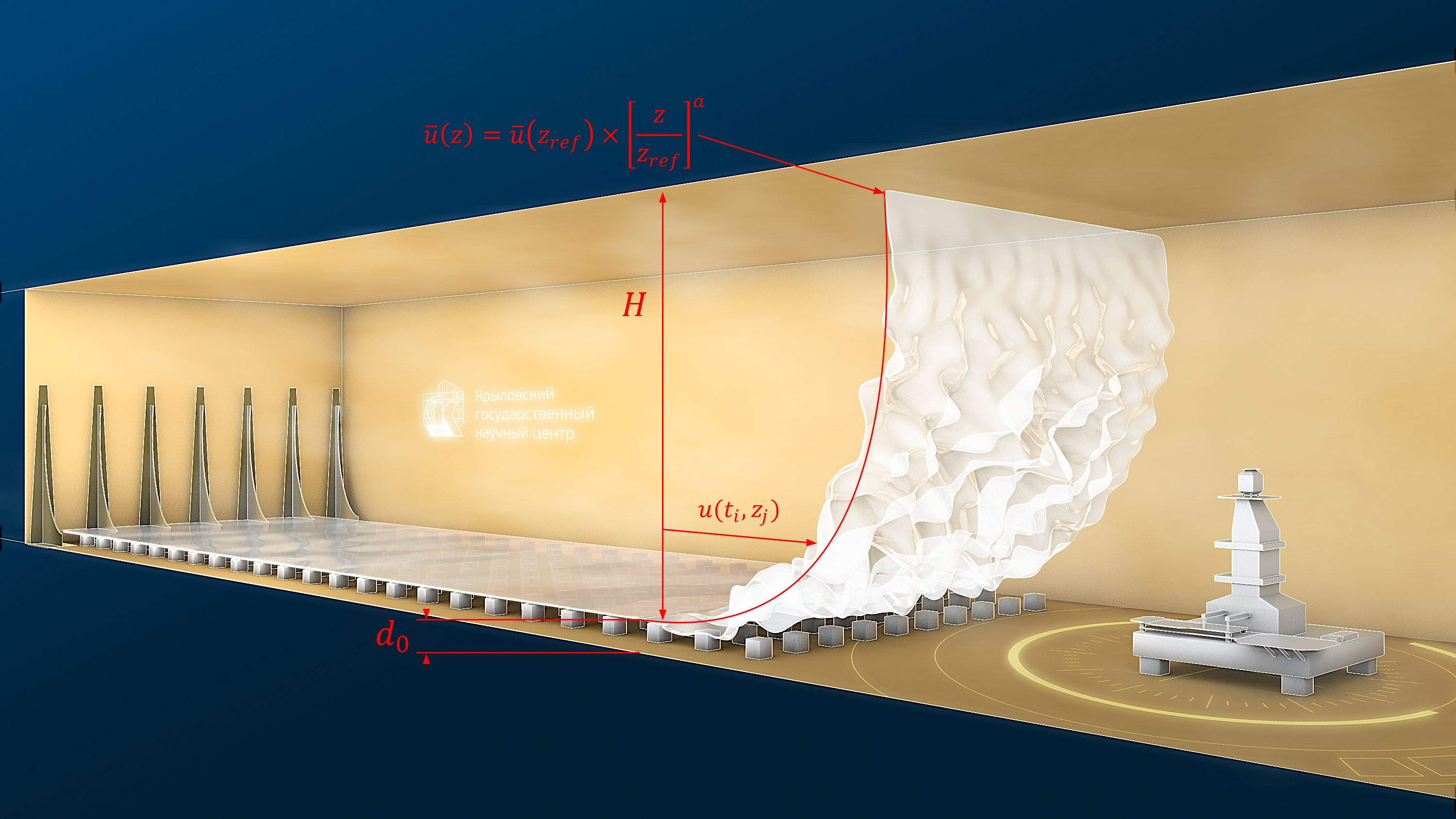
A drawing of the test section in an environmental wind tunnel. It shows the velocity profile generated by the test section obstructions. The profile is a simulation of the natural wind boundary layer with height 'H' and turbulent velocity profile 'u'.

Wind tunnel tests are used to determine wind velocities around buildings and bridges, and the wind forces on them.

Environmental wind tunnels are used to simulate the boundary layer of the atmosphere in windy conditions near the earth's surface. The wind near the ground is highly turbulent. Whereas vehicle wind tunnels have features to produce steady, straight-line air approaching the test model environmental tunnels need spires followed by small cubes on the floor to make the air represent the atmosphere boundary layer as it approaches the test object. The forces caused by wind on high-rise buildings and bridges have to be understood so they can be built using a minimum of construction materials while still being safe in very high winds. Another significant application for boundary layer wind tunnel modeling is for understanding exhaust gas dispersion patterns for hospitals, laboratories, and other emitting sources. Other examples of boundary layer wind tunnel applications are assessments of pedestrian comfort and snow drifting. Wind tunnel modeling is accepted as a method for aiding in green building design. For instance, the use of boundary layer wind tunnel modeling can be used as a credit for Leadership in Energy and Environmental Design (LEED) certification through the US Green Building Council.

== See also ==
- Index of aviation articles
- Automobile design
- Sting (fixture)
- Tacoma Narrows Bridge (1950), the first suspension bridge to be tested in a wind tunnel
- Water tunnel, the hydrodynamics-oriented version of a wind tunnel
- List of wind tunnels
