= Pressure-sensitive paint =

Pressure-sensitive paint (PSP) is a method for measuring air pressure or local oxygen concentration, usually in aerodynamic settings. PSP is paint-like coating which fluoresces under a specific illumination wavelength in differing intensities depending on the external air pressure being applied locally to its surface.

== Scientific origins ==
Pressure-sensitive paint was initially conceived due to a combination of research and development from the fields of chemistry, flow visualization, imaging and aerodynamic design testing. The phenomena of photoluminescence and oxygen quenching have been studied for many years. John I. Peterson and Raphael V. Fitzgerald are the first to publish observations and suggestions to apply oxygen quenching materials for flow visualization.

Research to develop different materials combinations of oxygen quenching fluorescing molecules for use as sensors was undertaken in the former Soviet Union at TsAGI/Moscow in cooperation with Moscow University and the United States by Dr. Martin Gouterman of the University of Washington for Abbott Laboratories in the mid 1980's.

== Early coatings development ==
Development of practical surface coatings applied as paints to measure air pressure were conducted in the mid-1980's in the former Soviet Union and at the NASA Ames Research Center in collaboration with the University of Washington in the late 1980's.

== Measurement systems development: NASA Joint Sponsored Research Project (1993-1996) ==
NASA organized a public/private partnership to further development for aerodynamic applications in 1993. The primary partnership members included the NASA Ames and Langley Research Centers; Boeing Commercial Aircraft Company and the University of Washington. Information exchange partnership participants included Purdue University and McDonnell Douglas Aircraft Company. The partnership was organized through the NASA Joint Sponsored Research Program, operated from 1993 to 1996 and resulted in new patents, imaging systems, analytic software and paint formulations for future development.

== How it works ==
A model surface is painted with the PSP coating with an airbrush or automotive type paint gun. The PSP consists of an oxygen sensitive probe suspended in an oxygen permeable binder. The model is then placed in an oven so the PSP layer can cure. Once cured, the model is placed in a wind tunnel or appropriate test environment. LED lamps of a specific wavelength are used to excite the pressure-sensitive probe within the paint. Once excited, the pressure-sensitive probe is transitioned to a higher energy state where it may either emit a photon or be quenched by local oxygen present. This competing process of emission and quenching determines the intensity response of the paint layer. The result is a dimmer fluorescence where there is higher pressure and brighter response at lower pressures.

The intensity emitted from the surface is then recorded through a long-pass filter by a CCD or scientific grade camera and stored for conversion to pressure using a previously determined calibration. Images of the paint layer are recorded at three conditions. A wind-off image at a known reference condition which is typically standard atmospheric conditions with the tunnel turned off. A wind-on image at a loaded condition where the wind tunnel is running at condition. And lastly a background image where the ambient light present is captured without the illumination source. The background image is then subtracted from the wind-off reference and the wind-on condition image in data processing. Photographs of the surface can be obtained from outside the wind tunnel's test section, which means that the model need never be disturbed or touched in order to obtain the pressure distribution. Computer-aided photography can be used to produce false-color images, where the color range corresponds to the pressure variations.

== Applications ==
=== Wind tunnels ===
Due to the high cost of constructing airplanes, the first designs of proposed aircraft are usually subjected to aerodynamic testing in wind tunnels. In these tunnels, models (usually subscale) are subjected to airflows to simulate an actual airplane in free flight. The aerodynamic forces acting on the model are measured, and are used to predict the response of an airplane when subjected to equivalent airflows.

Automobiles are also subjected to aerodynamic testing in wind tunnels. Automobile companies use data collected in these tests to measure areas of high and low pressure. This data helps engineers improve designs to increase performance for the vehicles. By changing these designs, engineers can help improve gas mileage and reduce noise.

In order to measure the aerodynamic forces on the whole model, beam balances are connected to the model. However, it is also imperative to understand how those forces are distributed across the aerodynamic surfaces of the aircraft, and this understanding is more difficult to obtain. The classic approach has been to use an array of pressure taps to measure surface pressure distributions on a model. Pressure taps provide limited spatial resolution and are often limited by model geometry and can be very expensive to integrate into complex geometries.

PSP provides a low-cost alternative that is less invasive than pressure tap arrays. PSP also offers superior spatial resolution, with each pixel of the imaging camera acting as a pressure tap. PSP can achieve accuracy within 150 Pa of pressure tap measurements with good setup and experience.

Time-resolved PSP applications involve pulsed excitation and delay and gating of the imaging devices. One can thus determine pressure differentials as a function of time. In this case, the imaging devices must be synchronized to the excitation. Multi-channel digital delay/pulse generators provide that synchronization.

=== Medical devices ===
Development for medical applications was undertaken in the early 1990's between Abbott Laboratories and the University of Washington.

== Binary pressure sensitive paints (BPSP) ==
Another area of interest has been the measurement of surface pressure in low-speed wind tunnels. Binary PSP systems are used in low-speed wind tunnel environments where pressure gradients are small and error sources are more significant. Model shift between reference condition and loaded condition, variation in paint thickness, lamp instability, and temperature are significant sources of error in PSP data. Binary PSP mitigates many of these error sources by employing a second probe into the paint layer, known as the reference probe. This reference probe is used to ratio out the effects of these errors producing high quality PSP pressure maps at low speeds. Binary pressure sensitive paints can also include a luminophore that is sensitive to temperature to measure the heat transfer coefficient. This provides additional accuracy in the pressure readings.

== Advantages ==
The greatest advantage of the new technology is its much reduced preparation time compared to installing an array of pressure taps. The same model can be used for other testing, such as load-bearing tests or radar-reflection tests, since the PSP will not interfere with other preparations or setups. There are far more data points than other methods. There is essentially a "pressure tap" at every pixel instead of being limited to the actual pressure taps.
