= Advanced General Aviation Transport Experiments =

U.S. technology maturation project

The Advanced General Aviation Transport Experiments (AGATE) project was an eight-year technology maturation project within the NASA Aeronautics Research Mission Directorate, implemented through an alliance of NASA, the FAA, the general aviation industry and a number of universities. Its goal was to revitalize the U.S. General Aviation (GA) industry capacity for deploying advancing technologies for small, technologically advanced aircraft (TAA), in the interest of advancing U.S. global leadership in GA. The vision included laying the technical foundations for TAA that would be relevant for more widely distributed public transportation among smaller regional, GA, and community airports across the Nation. The technologies addressed by the project included flight systems, propulsion sensors and controls, design and manufacturing, crash-worthiness, ice protection systems, and flight training systems. The objective of the research was to simplify aircraft operations while enhancing safety and utility in ways that would lead to revitalization of the GA industry.

The AGATE project led to a follow-on initiative, Small Aviation Transportation System (SATS), focused on how TAA aircraft could operate safely and efficiently for travel to and from the thousands of airports in the U.S. The challenge to solve involved flight operations in airspace that did not have traditional Communications, Navigation, and Surveillance (CNS) infrastructure for air traffic management. The objective was to enable systems for aircraft self-sequencing, -merging, and - spacing in non-radar surveilled airspace. The Small Aviation Transportation System was intended to make many time-sensitive short-haul trips more affordable for public, business, medical, public safety and recreational pursuits.

== Alliance creation ==
The AGATE Alliance was launched in 1994 and born out of an effort to stem the gradual decline of general aviation innovation in the United States that began in the 1980's and continued into the 1990's. The AGATE research agenda played an instrumental role in the forging of joint technology development, flight testing, and certification through partnerships between Government, industry and vital non-profit contributors.

The AGATE Alliance was organized as an operating alliance between government, industry, and academia established to develop new ways of reviving the troubled general aviation industry. The Alliance was the product of two years of government-industry collaboration. The Alliance, composed of representatives from each partnership sector, was formed to give the revitalization effort formal structure. It will also leverage and focus resources for higher risk efforts with higher payoffs.

== The decline of general aviation ==
General aviation, defined as all flying except the military services and commercial airlines, had fallen from its position of economic prominence in the late 1970s to record lows in the mid-1980s before recovering in the late 1990s. American GA aircraft production numbers declined down from 18,000 in 1978 to 954 in 1993, an all-time low. Regulatory restrictions, liability claims and a withering of the product innovation pipeline took their toll on the industry, driving up prices and causing some businesses to file for bankruptcy.

== The prescription for change ==
Approximately 70 U.S. aviation-related organizations and companies, including NASA, the Federal Aviation Administration (FAA), private industry, academia, and non-profit organizations, agreed to reverse these downward trends. Together, this consortium worked to develop safer, more affordable aircraft and user-friendly flight systems that promise to improve pilot training and simplify operations in and near congested airports.

The AGATE Alliance design was generated by the American Technology Initiative, Inc. (AmTech), a California non-profit corporation retained by NASA to organize and operationally support public/private technology alliances. The AGATE Alliance partnership agreement was finalized by negotiations between AmTech staff members facilitated by Paul A. Masson (VP-Technology Commercialization; https://www.linkedin.com/in/paulmasson/), NASA, the FAA, and the many alliance partners.

A significant first technology step toward an effective partnership was taken in the spring of 1995, with the first meeting of the AGATE Alliance with the government program managers directed by the head of the General Aviation Program Office at the NASA Langley Research Center, Dr. Bruce J. Holmes (https://www.linkedin.com/in/brucejholmes/ ). NASA Headquarters designated Langley as the lead NASA research center for the general aviation R&D programs. Other NASA Aeronautics Research Centers also provided vital leadership and technology contributions, including Ames Research Center at Moffett Field, California, Armstrong Flight Center at Edwards, California, and Glenn Research Center in Cleveland, Ohio.

== AGATE structure ==
The AGATE Alliance was designed by a team from American Technology Alliances and consisted of two parts: an industry consortium called the "AGATE Alliance Association, Inc" (AAAI). This association membership was composed of three categories of members from 31 states, 40 principal members from industry, 6 associate members from industry and universities, and 30 supporting members from universities, industry and non-profit organizations. AAAI membership support operations were led by Mr. John (Jack) Sheehan (Master Army Aviator. USARMY, Retired, https://www.linkedin.com/in/john-jack-sheehan-44a1008/). Under the direction of Dr. Bruce J. Holmes, the NASA General Aviation Program Office (GAPO) coordinated Federal participation, budgeting, and technology development agendas with the FAA, DoD (USAF), industry and universities. As the AGATE technology outcomes for TAA aircraft applications matured, the requirements for closer collaboration with the FAA grew; and the definition of the follow-on flight testing activities in the SATS project needed comprehensive FAA coordination. These requirements were managed by an FAA assignee to the project, Mr. Peter G. McHugh (USARMY Aviation, Retired), co-located at NASA Langley. The dual Government-Industry structure created a public/private partnership. It was one of the largest public/private membership alliances in the United States.

The purpose of AGATE was to enable the GA industry to pursue market growth for inter-city transportation in small technologically advanced aircraft (TAA). AGATE aimed to make single-pilot, light airplanes (certified under CFR 14 Part 23/Amendment 64) more safe, affordable and available as a viable part of the nation's transportation system. AGATE technology-enabled aircraft targeted trips of 150 to 700 miles - round trips that are too far to complete in a day and too short to efficiently use the hub-and-spoke system.

The formal actions leading to the creation of the Alliance resulted from a meeting between NASA administrator Daniel S. Goldin and industry representatives at the Experimental Aircraft Association Convention in Oshkosh, Wisconsin, in 1993. In advance of that meeting, between 1989 and 1993, Dr. Holmes and an FAA executive colleague, Robert A. Wright (https://www.linkedin.com/in/robert-wright-a6448b12/, deceased) collaborated on a briefing titled "US general aviation: The ingredients for a renaissance. A vision and technology strategy for US industry, NASA, FAA, Universities, 1993 (https://ntrs.nasa.gov/citations/19940020615)." During those years, Holmes and Wright proceeded to travel around the U.S. (by GA) visiting numerous of the U.S. GA industry executives, socializing the concept and soliciting input for what became the AGATE Alliance. The concept was widely welcomed, with few exceptions (even those exceptions were later reversed by industry individuals). Following the 1993 meeting at Oshkosh, Administrator Goldin tasked the industry participants to produce a report summarizing the technology requirements, industry commitments, and what industry needed from NASA for the purposes of revitalization. The industry appointed John W. Olcott (https://www.linkedin.com/in/john-w-olcott-ba100b5/), then the President of the National Business Aviation Association (NBAA) to chair the industry committee that published their report to NASA. On the basis of that report, Holmes, Masson, with industry representatives and the NASA team proceeded to develop the R&D agenda topics and the related "Work Packages" that formed the organizational structure of the technical work plans.

Designed as a joint government-industry effort, the partnership was also a NASA response to the Clinton Administration and Congress' commitment best described in the report published by Vice President Al Gore, "The Gore Report on Reinventing Government: Creating a Government That Works Better and Costs Less (Gore, Albert. The Gore report on reinventing government: Creating a government that works better and costs less. Three Rivers Press, 1993.)." NASA retained American Technology Alliances to design the AGATE Alliance. Paul Masson of American Technology Alliances led a team of five individuals that worked for one year with NASA, the FAA and general aviation industry members to formulate the Alliance. A private sector R&D syndicated partnership model was used in which the AGATE members shared resources and risks to make the market "pie" bigger for everyone. Leadership and strategy development were also shared. Costs were shared 50/50 between government and industry. The focus was on commercializing advanced concepts through joint ventures in order to produce results that would be difficult or impossible for a single company to accomplish independently.

The Alliance was organized as a public/private partnership by the NASA Joint Sponsored Research Program (JSRP), developed for NASA Ames Research Center by AmTech, Inc. (Wikipedia contributors. (2025, October 26). NASA Joint Sponsored Research Program. In Wikipedia, The Free Encyclopedia. Retrieved 23:42, January 2, 2026, from https://en.wikipedia.org/w/index.php title=NASA_Joint_Sponsored_Research_Program&oldid=1318923357). Research conducted under a JSRA permitted building collaborative projects in a broader scale than permissible under the Federal Acquisition Regulations (FAR), and used the stronger reporting and accountability standards of private sector joint research projects. The Alliance, according to Dr. Holmes, was unique in the history of NASA Aeronautics R&D investments in serving as a "blueprint" to map out the Government's research and development support for systemic GA innovation revitalization. This blueprint provided industry with more flexibility for engaging with competitors and the US Government, and provided the opportunity to take greater risks with higher payoff, faster speed of technology transfer, control of proprietary and shared technologies, and reduced cost and more efficient use of scarce research and development resources.

The forming of the Alliance, which had 100+ Members in 31 States at its peak, was also welcomed by the FAA. "General aviation is an integral part of the air traffic system architecture. AGATE is in the right place at the right time to support modernization of the system for GA," said Dr. George F. Donohue, FAA Associate Administrator for research and systems acquisition.

AGATE objectives included fostering revenue growth and job creation in the areas of manufacturing, sales, training, service, support and operations industries within the U.S. small airport infrastructure. The technology program focused on the maturation of new and emerging technologies that had applications for GA aircraft. These applications included bad weather flight and landing systems, graphic displays of weather in the cockpit, flight path guidance information (Highway in the Sky); emergency coping and avoidance measures that use on-board systems to support decision-making; traffic avoidance systems; systems that reduce the flight planning workload and enhance passenger safety; and systems designed to improve passenger crashworthiness safety, aircraft performance and utility. The success of AGATE, and by extension of the SATS project, can be measured in terms of industry deployment of aircraft system innovations in the nearer-term, and in the longer-term, increases in pilot population, flight hours, airport utilization and new aircraft deliveries. Several new aircraft products were introduced in the market during the years following the completion of both the AGATE and the SATS projects.

== Olympic challenge -- Early Technology Trials ==
The 1996 Summer Olympic Games in Atlanta provided a rare opportunity to evaluate technologies developed as part of AGATE and, in the process, help transport goods and provide public safety services by helicopter during the July 19 through August 4 Games.

AGATE Alliance members contributed to a government-industry initiative known as the Atlanta Short-haul Transportation System (ASTS), (now called Operation Heli-Star). The ASTS program was responsible for fostering both air and ground transportation during the Olympics and integrating the two into one efficient transportation system.

AGATE Alliance members provided special airborne equipment and ground monitoring stations that enabled the ASTS program to operate safely and efficiently. AGATE's participation in the Atlanta Olympics was managed by the AGATE Flight Systems industry team coordinated by NASA Langley Research Center.

Up to 50 helicopters equipped with AGATE-designed avionics participated, proving communications, navigation and surveillance concepts, some integrated in flight for the first time. The initial plan projected collecting more than 1,400 hours of flight data on operational use and human factors during the Olympic Games.

Most of the critical flight operations were conducted in "uncontrolled" air space outside Atlanta's radar coverage area, hence the need for predetermined flight pathways. While flying over concrete highways on the ground, selected helicopters flew electronic "highways in the sky," shown on an onboard computerized map of the Atlanta area. The composite image was generated on the helicopter using an onboard database and replicated on ground consoles. The pilot saw GPS-based position updates provided via digital radio data links.

This technology effort aided participating pilots in the safe and efficient conduct of their missions and additionally benefited ground personnel by indicating the precise location of aircraft to facilitate their timely deployment to satisfy high priority transportation and emergency response needs during the Olympics.

== NASA and small businesses integration ==
NASA coordinated small, entrepreneurial general aviation businesses into the AGATE Alliance to match their high rate of innovation with the systems engineering leadership of NASA Langley personnel and the certification experience of major general aviation aircraft manufacturers. NASA's Small Business Innovation Research (SBIR) program and Small Business Technology Transfer (STTR) pilot program monitored and adjusted their research topics according to an overall AGATE research roadmap that was annually approved by a joint industry-government Executive Council. The programs offered small businesses the opportunity to transfer NASA and other government-funded research and technology into the marketplace. The SBIR/STTR general aviation programs generated targeted innovations that both supported the NASA general aviation mission and served the nation's efforts in enhancing the general aviation industry innovation capacity. Between 1994 and 2009, NASA awarded an estimated 65 Phase I and 22 Phase II SBIR/STTR awards related to general aviation in excess of $18 million to approximately 50 general aviation companies. The NASA general aviation office offered companies that are awarded NASA SBIR or STTR contracts to participate in the AGATE Alliance as Associate members.

== University participation ==
In presenting the awards for the first General Aviation Design Competition in 1995, NASA Administrator Dan Goldin cited the value of engaging US engineering students in "innovative design education in general aviation" and encouraging universities to be partners in creating "a small aircraft transport system for the nation."
