= Miniature mass spectrometer =

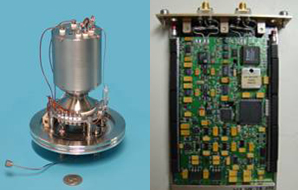
The Miniature Paul Ion Trap and board-level RF electronics

A miniature mass spectrometer (MMS) is a type of mass spectrometer (MS) which has small size and weight and can be understood as a portable or handheld device. What it means to be portable and a set of criteria by which portable and miniature mass spectrometers can be assessed have been discussed in detail. Current lab-scale mass spectrometers however, usually weigh hundreds of pounds and can cost on the range from thousands to millions of dollars. One purpose of producing MMS is for in situ analysis. This in situ analysis can lead to much simpler mass spectrometer operation such that non-technical personnel like physicians at the bedside, firefighters in a burning factory, food safety inspectors in a warehouse, or airport security at airport checkpoints, etc. can analyze samples themselves saving the time, effort, and cost of having the sample run by a trained MS technician offsite. Although, reducing the size of MS can lead to a poorer performance of the instrument versus current analytical laboratory standards, MMS is designed to maintain sufficient resolutions, detection limits, accuracy, and especially the capability of automatic operation. These features are necessary for the specific in-situ applications of MMS mentioned above.

== Coupling and ionization in miniature mass spectrometer ==
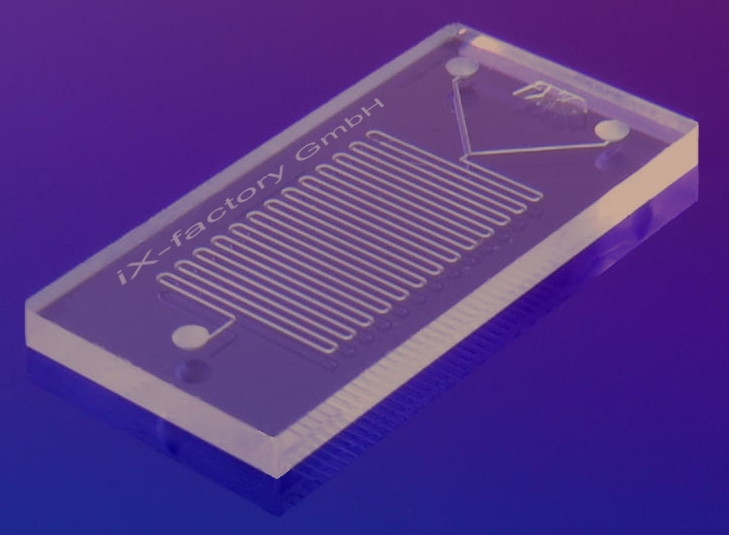
Microfluidic Chip iX-factory

In typical mass spectrometry, MS is coupled with separation tools like gas chromatography, liquid chromatography or electrophoresis to reduce the effect of the matrix or background and improve the selectivity especially when the analytes are widely different in concentration. Sample preparation including sample collection, extraction, pre-separation increases the size of the mass analysis system and adds time and sophistication to the analysis. A lot of contribution promotes miniaturizing devices and simplifying the operations. A micro-GC has been implemented to fit to a portable MS system. Besides microfluidics is a competent candidate for MMS and automating sample preparation. In this technique, most of the steps for sample preparation are staged similarly with laboratory systems, but miniature chip-based devices are used with low consumption of sample and solvents. One way to circumvent classical, lab-based sample introduction systems is the use of ambient ionization, as it does not require mechanical or electrical coupling to a MMS and can generate ions in the open atmosphere without prior sample preparation, but at the cost of more rigorous vacuum system requirements. Different ambient ionization methods, including low-temperature plasma, paper spray, and extraction spray, have been demonstrated to be highly compatible with MMS. A rigorous review of ambient ionization sources in the context of portable and miniature mass spectrometry has developed a set of criteria by which performance and portability can be evaluated. Without separation coupling, the basic building blocks in MMS, which are similar in composition with the conventional laboratory counterpart, are sample inlet, ionization source, mass analyzers, detector, vacuum system, instrument control and data acquisition system. Three most important components in MMS contributing to miniaturization are mass analyzer, vacuum system and electronics control system. Reducing the size of any components is beneficial to the miniaturization. However, it is noticeable that minimizing the analyzer’s size can greatly enhance the miniaturization of the other components especially the vacuum system because the analyzer is the pressure deciding factor for MS analysis and pressure interface fabrication.

== Miniature mass analyzer ==
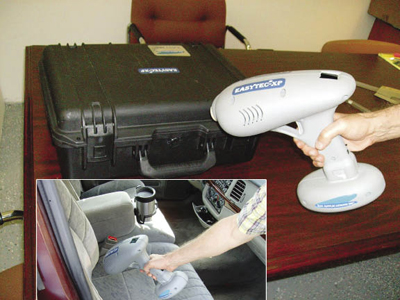
Ion mobility spectrometer for trace detection of explosives and other dangerous chemicals.

Smaller mass analyzers require smaller control system to generate adequate electric field and magnetic field strength, which are two fundamental fields separating ions based on their mass-to-charge ratio. Because a compact circuit can generate a high electric field, decreasing the size of the voltage-generating system does not significantly affect to the miniaturization of time-of-flight mass spectrometry (TOF) and electric sectors which use only the electric field to separate ions.

In principle, the electromagnetic field mainly depends on the shape of the mass analyzers. As a result, a smaller magnet fitting with small size MS reduces the system weight significantly. In practice, when reducing the size, the geometries of mass analyzer are distorted. For example, smaller volume in ion trap leads to lower trapping capacity and therefore results in a loss of resolution and sensitivity. However, by utilizing tandem MS resolution and selectivity can be greatly enhanced in complex mixtures. In general, beam-type mass analyzers, such as TOF and sector mass analyzers, are much larger than ion trap type such as Paul trap, Penning trap or Fourier transform ion cyclotron resonance mass spectrometry (FT-ICR). Additionally, ion trap mass analyzers can be used to perform multistage MS/MS in a single device. As a result, ion traps are received dominant attention for building a MMS.

=== Miniature time of flight ===
Some researchers are successful in designing a series of miniature TOF mass analyzers. Cotter at Johns Hopkins University used a pulsed extraction in linear time of flight mass analyzer and the ions are accelerated to with higher energy of 12 keV to enable detection of high-mass. The group achieved resolutions of 1/1200 and 1/600 at m/z 4500 and 12000 respectively. This mini analyzer can measure 66k Da proteins, mixtures of oligonucleotides, and biological spores. Verbeck at University of North Texas, created a mini-TOF based on reflectron TOF with a microelectromechanical system technology. To overcome the low resolution of short flight tube, the effective ion travelling path length is extended by moving ions back and forth in periods of time. The system used a 5-cm endcap reflectron TOF with higher-order kinetic energy focusing to analyze the ions with m/z exceeding 60,000.

Ecelberger, a senior professional staff scientist in the Sensor Science Group of the Research and Technology Development Center at APL also developed a suitcase TOF incorporated with matrix-assisted laser desorption/ionization MALDI. The suitcase TOF was tested by scientists from U.S. Army Soldier and Biological Chemical Command. The samples are biological toxins and chemical agents with the mass range from a few hundred daltons to over 60 kDa. The Suitcase TOF was referenced with a commercial TOFMS for the same experiments. Both instruments can detect all but a few compounds with very encouraging results. Because a commercial TOFMS uses a higher voltage pulsed extraction with longer flight tube with other optimized conditions, it generally has better sensitivity and resolution than a suitcase TOF. However, in the case of very high mass compounds, the suitcase TOF shows as good resolution and sensitivity as the commercial TOF. The suitcase TOF was also tested with a series of chemical weapons agents. Every compound tested was detected at levels comparable to standard analytical techniques for these agents.

=== Miniature sector ===
Several miniature double-focusing mass analyzers have been fabricated. A non-scanning Mattauch–Herzog geometry sector was developed using new materials to construct a lighter magnet. Under the collaboration of University of Minnesota and Universidad de Costa Rica, a miniature double-focusing sector was produced under sophisticated technique of conventional machining methods and thin film patterning to overcome the distortion of the electric-magnetic fields due to small size. The MMS can reach a detection limit close to 10 ppm, a dynamic range of 5 orders of magnitude and a mass range up to 103 Da. The mass analyzer overall sizes 3.5cmx6cmx7.5 cm and it weighs 0.8 kg and consumes 2.5 W.

=== Miniature linear quadrupole mass filter ===
The linear quadrupole mass filter or quadrupole mass analyzer is one of the most popular mass analyzer. The mini-quadrupole has been used as a single analyzer or in arrays of identical mass analyzers. The quadrupole array has rods of 0.5mm radius and 10mm long while another one with rods of 1mm radius and 25mm long. These mini quadrupole were developed and characterized at a radio frequency (RF) higher than 11 MHz. Volatile organic compounds were ionized by electron ionization and were characterized with unit resolution. Micromachining was applied to produce a much smaller V-groove quadrupole.

=== Miniature ion trap mass analyzer ===
Ion traps include quadrupole ion traps or Paul trap, Fourier transform ion cyclotron resonance or Penning trap and newly developed orbitrap. However, Paul trap receives a great focus from researchers for a MMS because of its distinct advantages over other mass analyzers for building MMS. One of the benefits is that ion traps can work at much higher pressures than beam type mass analyzers and can be simplified with different geometry for the ease of fabrication. For example, a miniature quadrupole ion trap mass analyzers, such as cylindrical ion trap, linear ion trap, rectilinear ion trap), can operate at several mTorr in contrast to 10^{−5} Torr or less for other analyzers and it is able to perform MS/MS in a single device with minimum size of electronics system. Nevertheless, as the size gets smaller, it is hard to maintain the electric field shape and precise configuration and will negatively affect ion motion. The goal is to make the trap smaller without losing ion capacity. Tridion-9 mass spectrometer with toroidal ion trap is designed with a doughnut-shaped volume that can hold up to 400 times more ions. The outstanding result is achieved as the radius is reduced to one-fifth of a conventional laboratory ion trap while maintaining the ion capacity.

== Miniature vacuum system ==
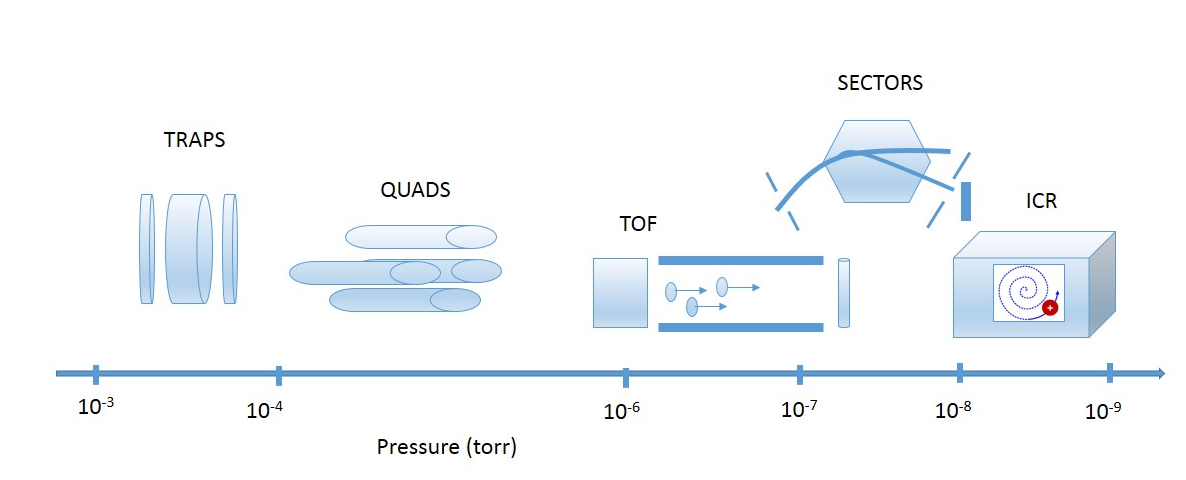
Pressure in mass spectrometer

The purpose of using the vacuum is to eliminate background signal and avoid intermolecular collision events, therefore, providing a long mean free path for the ions. The vacuum system, including the vacuum pumps and the vacuum manifold with its various interfaces, is often the heaviest part and consumes the most power in a mass spectrometer. In the case of TOF, if the length of drift region is decreased, the pressure inside region can be operated at higher value because the free collision region is still maintained for a short traveling distance of the ions. As a result, the vacuum system requires less power to run the system. For a trap-type mass analyzer, because the ions are trapped in the device for long periods and the accumulated trajectory length is much longer than the size of the mass analyzer, the size reduction of the mass analyzer may not directly affect the adequate operating pressure. Miniature rough-turbo pump configurations similar to lab-scale instruments have been developed to be compatible with MMS. For high-vacuum pumping, turbomolecular pumps are also upgraded. A Thermo Fisher Orbitrap used three turbo pumps in LC-MS modes to achieve a vacuum below 10^{−10} torr.

Recently, a turbo pump from Creare, Inc.TM weighs only 500g and needs below 18 W power to run. The pump can provide the ultimate vacuum below 10^{−8} torr, which is much lower than the operating pressure necessary for a MMS.

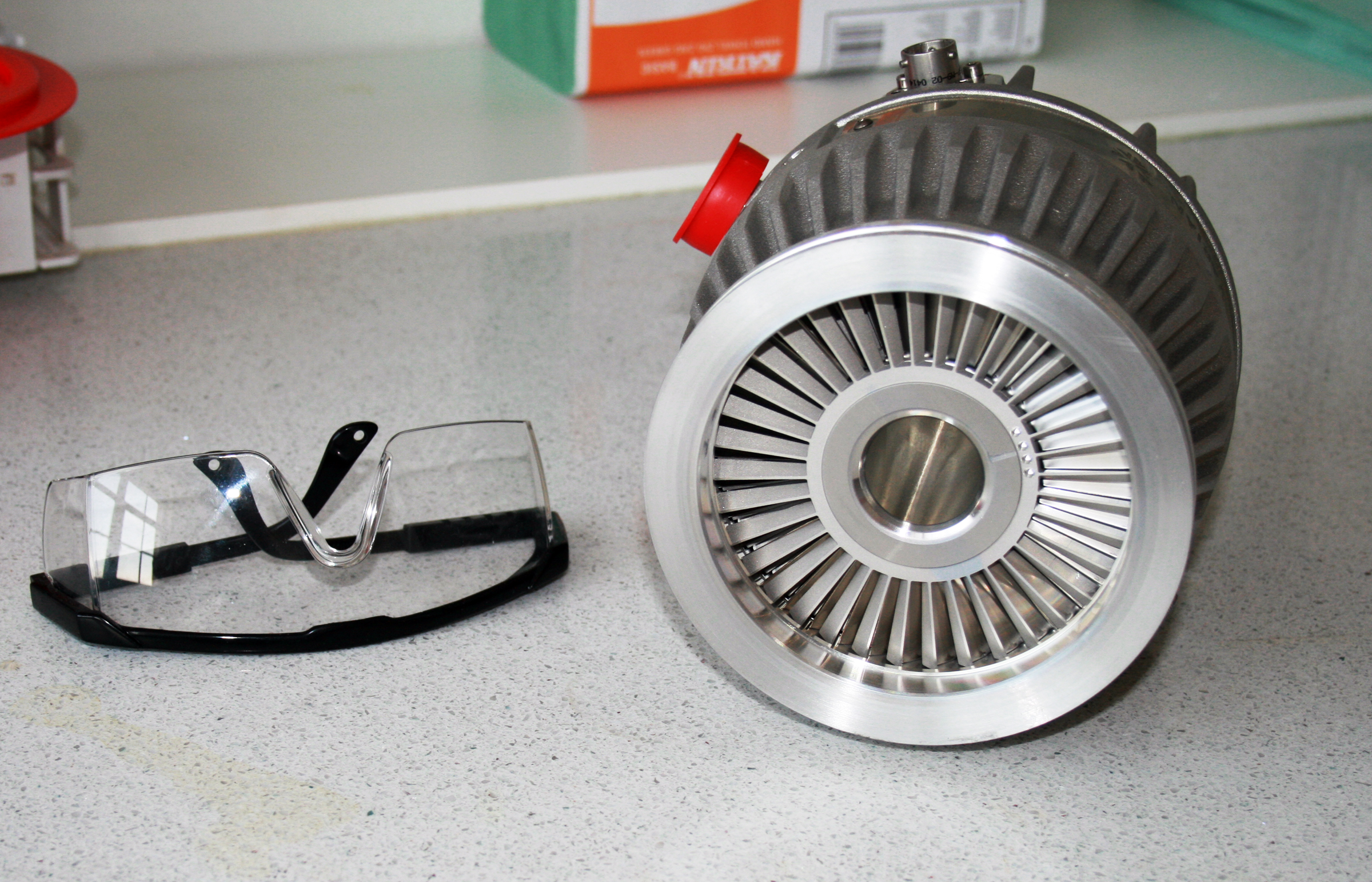
Turbomolecular pump

== The leading research groups, producers and applications ==
One of the leading groups in academy for creating ion-trap MMS is Prof. Graham Cooks with his associate Professor Zheng Ouyang at Purdue University. They have built a series of mini mass spectrometer based on quadrupole ion trap called Mini 10, Mini 11, Mini 12. The group used Mini 10 mass spectrometer weighing 10 kg to analyze proteins, peptides and alkaloids in complex plant materials with electrospray ionization ESI and paperspray ionization. The group used low radio frequency of resonant ion ejection to increase mass range up to 17,000 Da proteins. For interfacing ESI source with MMS, a 10 cm stainless steel capillary was fabricated to transfer the ions directly into the vacuum manifold. The resulting high pressure of 20 mTorr, which is several orders of magnitude higher than that used in lab-scale mass spectrometers is compensated by using the pressure-tolerant rectilinear ion trap. One of the key component of this MMS is the commercial turbo-bump and the MS can be operated at 10^{−3} torr. To overcome the problem of continuous sample introduction because of the small size of the pump, the group developed a technique called discontinuous atmospheric pressure introduction (DAPI). This technique performs direct chemical analysis without sample pretreatment and enables the coupling of miniature mass spectrometers to atmospheric pressure ionization sources, including ESI, atmospheric pressure chemical ionization (APCI), and various ambient ionization sources. The ions are transferred from ionization source and hold at a punch-valve and injected to MS periodically. The performance of a hand-held Mini-10 mass spectrometer was upgraded with negative ion mode for detecting explosive compounds and hazardous materials at the picogram level, which is highly applicable for airport luggage checking. The 8.5 kg Mini- 11 and 25 kg Mini-12 can produce resolution mass spectra up to m/z 600, a range that makes it useful for studying metabolites, lipids, and other small molecules. The group also developed and incorporated a digital microfluidic platform to the MMS with the application to extract and quantify drugs in urine. Mini 12 can perform MS^{5} and analyze directly such complex samples as whole blood, untreated food, and environmental samples, without sample preparation or chromatographic separation.

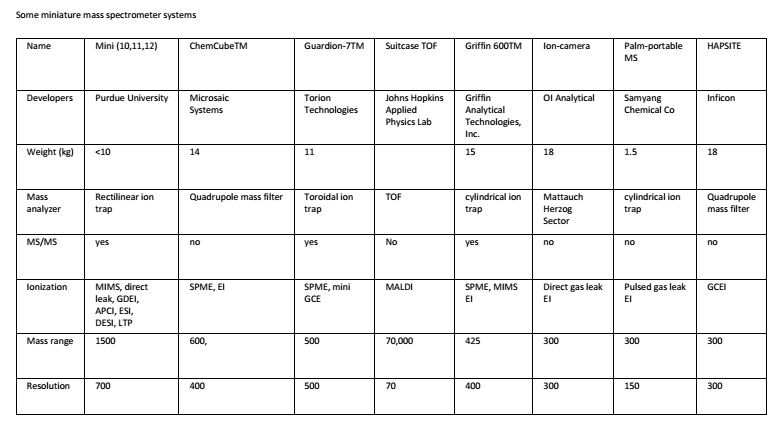
Miniature mass spectrometer systems

1st Detect introduced the MMS 1000 which is a cylindrical ion-trap mass spectrometer with MS/MS capability. Some characteristics are advertised as wide mass range (35-450 Da), high resolution (<0.5 Da FWHM), fast analysis time (>=0.5s). The inlet flow rate can be high – up to 600ml/min with no external pumps or carrier gases. The MMS 1000 is incorporated with a non-cryogenic pre-concentrator. This coupling enhances the sensitivity up to 10^^{5} with a fast speed of 30s. 1st Detect's miniaturized mass spectrometers are used in a range of applications, including homeland security, military, breath analysis, leak detection, environmental and industrial quality control. The MMS 1000 was originally designed for NASA, for the purpose of monitoring air quality on the International Space Station.

908 Devices introduced a handheld mass spectrometer utilizing high-pressure mass spectrometry M908 weighing 2 kg with solid, liquid, gas multi-phase detector. On the other hand, Microsaic Systems in Surrey, United Kingdom develops single quadrupole mass spectrometer called 3500 and 4000 MiD. These mass analyzers are used for supporting the pharmaceutical process chemistry.

Several other MMS instruments have been also fabricated using ion trap mass analyzers, including Tridion-9 GCMS from TorionInc, now part of Perkin Elmer (AmericanFork, Utah), GC/QIT from the Jet Propulsion Laboratory, Chemsense 600 from Griffin Analytical Technology LLC. (West Lafayette, Indiana).

Another example is Girgui at Harvard University, who built a MMS based on existing underwater mass spectrometers (UMS) that can operate underwater to study the influence of microbes on the methane and hydrogen content of the ocean. He worked with a mechanical engineer to package a commercial quadrupole mass analyzer from Stanford Research Systems, a Pfeiffer HiPace80 turbopump, and a custom gas extractor into a 25 cm × 90 cm cylinder. Total cost is about $15,000.

The Analytical Instrumentation Research Institute in Korea also developed a palm-portable mass spectrometer. The size and weight is reduced to 1.54 L and 1.48 kg respectively, and it used 5 W power only. The PPMS is based on four parallel disk ion traps, a small ion getter pump and a micro-computer. The PPM can perform the scan ion mass of up to m/z 300 and detect the ppm concentration of organic gases diluted in the air.

The Harsh-Environment Mass Spectrometry Society is holding a biannual workshop that focuses on in-situ mass spectrometry in extreme environments, such as in the deep ocean, volcano crater, or outer space require high reliability, autonomous or remote operation, ruggedness with minimum size, weight, and power. The archives of the workshop include ~100 presentations focusing on the design and application of miniature mass spectrometers. For example, In 8th Harsh Environment Mass Spectrometry Workshop, a group of scientists presented their study about utilization of lightweight MS based instrumentation and small Unmanned Aerial Vehicles UAV platforms for in-situ volcanic plume analysis in Turrialba and Arenal volcanoes (Costa Rica). Mini mass spectrometers relying on miniature 18 mm rods transpector quadrupole for mTorr pressure operation, a miniature turbo molecular drag pump and assets like small, multi-parameter battery powered sensor suite MiniGas embedded with micro PC control system, and telemetry system were integrated in an aircraft to acquire 4D image of an erupting volcanic plume.
