= NASA Joint Sponsored Research Program =

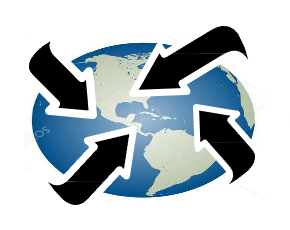
- Mission statement: Promote R&D partnerships between NASA and the private sector pertaining to dual-use technologies and to pre-competitive, commercially valuable technologies with industry-wide application.
- Type of project: Pilot Project: Management Policy and Implementation
- Products: Policy and Implementation Guides for Cost-Shared Partnerships, Seventeen Projects
- Location: NASA Ames Research Center
- Owner: NASA HQ, Commercial Programs (Code C), Commercial Technology Office (CTO)
- Key people: Kevin Barquinero, NASA Headquarters (CTO) Syed Shariq, NASA Ames Research Center Steven Gomes, AmTech, Inc.
- Established: 1989
- Closed: 1996

The Joint Sponsored Research Program (JSRP) was a NASA management system initiative to " establish a pilot program for Joint Sponsored Research Projects. Under this Program, the Agency may jointly fund with private sector entities technology research and development activities that further the Agency's goals and missions". The national policy goals were to accelerate technology development, maintain U.S. technological leadership, foster U.S. economic growth and competitiveness, and create jobs. The Program goals were to..."promote R&D partnerships between NASA and the private sector pertaining to dual-use technologies and to precompetitive, commercially valuable technologies with industry-wide application".

The Program, initiated by NASA Ames Research Center, was established to develop business models and legal frameworks for cost-sharing public–private partnerships. Its goals included reducing costs, enhancing technology transfer, and accelerating supply chain development. Launched in 1989, the Program completed 17 pilot partnerships by 1995, resulting in $41.7 million in cost savings. It also produced agency policy and implementation guidance before concluding in 1996. Agreements initiated under the Program continued through 2005.

== Objectives ==
The Program had five primary objectives:

- Partnering Process: Develop a collaboration framework that functions effectively within NASA and meets the needs of the private sector.
- Legal Agreement Instrument: Develop a customizable legal agreement model to accommodate the needs of both NASA and industry partners.
- Pilot Projects: Initiate projects to assess demand and test the collaboration process.
- Results: Evaluate outcomes to refine the process and guide future project formation.
- Conclusions: Draw conclusions about what works well and what does not, based on project outcomes.

== History ==
The program was proposed in 1987 by Jack Glazer, Chief Legal Counsel at NASA Ames Research Center, as a response to the Reagan administration's directive for NASA to define and implement space commercialization. NASA established a Space Commercialization Task Force in 1983, tasked with developing an "agency-wide policy and integrated program plan for enhancing NASA's ability to encourage and be responsive to commercialization endeavors." The Task Force's recommendations included..."evaluating the feasibility of new commercial partnership structures, including intellectual property and cost-sharing agreements." Prior to the proposal, Glazer had used center-level authority to initiate small-scale partnerships through funded Space Act Agreements, aiming to develop policies and procedures for cost-sharing research and development agreements.

== Program Phases ==
The Program was organized to design, test and implement cost-sharing partnerships using Space Act Authority in phases subject to oversight at NASA Ames and Headquarters:

Prototype Phase:

- 1987-1989: One prototype project explored and implemented, reported to NASA Ames Research Center (ARC) senior management
- 1989: NASA Headquarters senior management briefed on results, NASA JSR Program formed, quarterly reporting requirement established
- 1990: Conditional authority granted to use funded Space Act Authority to negotiate up to three JSR partnerships
- 1991: JSR Program results reported; conditional authority expanded to negotiate up to four additional JSR partnerships and convert up to ten existing NASA contracts into cost and intellectual property sharing partnerships

Scale Up Phase:

- 1993-1994: NASA Administrator delegates Space Act authority to the Associate Administrator for Space and Aeronautics Technology and Assistant Administrator for Commercial Technology to sign JSR Agreements; JSR Program managers directed to achieve five NASA-wide strategic objectives
- 1994-1995: NASA initiates funding of industry-led R&D consortia; NASA Administrator renews delegation of Space Act Authority and expands to senior managers of field installations; JSR Program Advisory Team (PAT) policy oversight and procedure compliance established for agency-wide implementation

NASA-Wide Deployment, Institutional Policy and Procedure:

- 1995-1996: JSR Program becomes operating unit of NASA's Commercial Technology Office (CTO); NASA-wide Policies and Procedures are drafted and distributed for guidance; NASA reports to Congress on JSR Program creation and example projects

== Program Requirements ==
The Program authorized use of funded Space Act Authority for NASA to enter into JSR Agreements on the condition that..."A JSR Project (must) develop and commercialize dual-use technology as well as be likely result in at least one of the following outcomes:

A. leverage the cost of technology development between NASA and private sector

B. enhancement of U.S. industry's competitive position in the global marketplace

C. conversion of aerospace or defense technology to commercial application."

== Partner Requirements ==
The program established nine requirements for prospective partners, emphasizing that Space Act cost-sharing agreements should only be used when other NASA agreement types cannot achieve the agency's strategic or mission objectives.

== Partnership Models ==
The program evaluated multiple partnership models varying in R&D scope, cost-sharing, intellectual property allocation, NASA oversight, and research location. It identified two primary models used in most projects through 1995:

- Dual-Use Research, Development, Testing & Evaluation- This..."type of partnership involves R&D collaboration between NASA and the private sector over technologies relevant to NASA missions applications and sought by the private sector for commercial applications. NASA may partner with a single company or with multiple companies. In addition, a university or nonprofit organization may be a partner."
- Industry-Led Projects and Consortia- This..."type of partnership involves R&D collaboration between NASA and a group of industry members over technologies that may have relevance industry-wide and are commercial valuable. NASA's role is to stimulate industry initiative in technology areas that are likely to have a significant impact on the industry's technology leadership or competitiveness, consistent with NASA's mission".

== Partnership Agreement Model: Joint Sponsored Research Agreement (JSRA) ==
The program developed a model legal framework, the Joint Sponsored Research Agreement (JSRA), under NASA's funded Space Act Authority. It was designed to allow customizable partnerships that incorporated federal requirements, intellectual property allocation, and commercial terms for multi-industry collaborations.

The model JSR Agreements included provisions for:

- R&D Performance
- Participant Criteria
- Funding with Cost Sharing Requirements
- Accounting and Audit Requirements
- Overhead Rate(s) Guidelines
- In-Kind Resources Valuation and Verification
- Intellectual Property Rights
- Commercialization Performance.

The JSRA was adopted as one of NASA's partnering business agreement models by the Agency's Innovative Partnership Program (IPP).

== Primary NASA Authority: Funded Space Act Authority ==
The Program's directive was to achieve NASA's strategic goals while maintaining fairness, cost-effectiveness, and the ability of both NASA and its partners to use intellectual property for individual and joint interests. Legal staff, led by Karen Robbins and overseen by Jack Glazer and later George Lenehan, analyzed NASA's optional legal authorities. The primary legal authorities included:

- Funded Space Act Authority
- Cooperative Agreements (Co-op)

Additional legal analyses were undertaken for use of:

- Memorandums of Understanding (MOU)
- Unfunded Space Act Authority

Each legal authority option was made available to partners during the prototype phase. The Program reported that only the Funded Space Act Authority assured commitment and coordination of the cost and intellectual property sharing necessary for customized partnership terms consistent with NASA's founding legislation. The U.S. Department of Defense was provided similar statutory authority to implement department-wide partnership programs. The Cooperative Agreement and MOU model was used in one major rotorcraft industry collaboration.

== Leadership, Management and Expertise ==
The program was managed by the Deputy Directors of NASA Ames Research Center (ARC), reporting to NASA Headquarters' Office of Aeronautics, Exploration and Technology (OAET) and the Commercial Technology Office (CTO) within Commercial Programs . Technical monitors and a business adoption team—comprising experts in contracts, cooperative agreements, intellectual property, finance, personnel, facilities, operations, project management, and technology transfer—were assigned by managers of the NASA Ames Research Center (ARC). The Program was staffed by professionals in the fields of R&D partnering, financial partnerships, law and research project administration through a Cooperative Agreement with a nonprofit, the American Technology Initiative, established to accelerate U.S. technology development and commercialization.

== Program Completion and Results ==
The program produced 178 project proposals, resulting in 17 cost-sharing partnerships that saved NASA $41.7 million between 1988 and 1995. The largest JSR Project, the AGATE Alliance, involved 76 organizations. The Program's guidelines were later adopted as NASA Policy Directives (NPD) and NASA Advisory Implementing Instructions (NAII) to guide cost-shared public–private partnerships focused on cost savings and commercialization. The Program was closed at the end of fiscal year 1996 after adoption of these policies and procedures.

== Adoption of Policies, Procedures and Partnership Models ==
The program's partnership models, legal templates, policy guidelines and implementation procedures were adopted as NASA Management Instructions (NMI) to enter partnership agreements, and NASA Advisory Implementing Instructions for Partnerships, and for Space Act Agreements. The collective policies, procedures and partnership models were utilized for Space Act Authority partnerships in NASA's Commercial Orbital Transportation Services (COTS) program in 2006, Commercial Crew Development (CCDev) program in 2011, Tipping Point Opportunities, and the Announcement of Collaboration Opportunity initiatives.

== See also (Wiki Pages) ==
- Pressure-sensitive Paint https://en.wikipedia.org/wiki/Pressure-sensitive_paint
- Shaklee-Astro-ade https://en.wikipedia.org/wiki/Shaklee
- Rotorcraft Industry Technology Association (RITA) https://en.wikipedia.org/wiki/The_Rotorcraft_Industry_Technology_Association_(RITA)
- Advanced General Aviation Transport Experiments (AGATE)https://en.wikipedia.org/wiki/Advanced_General_Aviation_Transport_Experiments
- NASA ERAST Program https://en.wikipedia.org/wiki/NASA_ERAST_Program
- NASA - COTS https://en.wikipedia.org/wiki/Commercial_Orbital_Transportation_Services
- NASA - Commercial Crew Program Essentials https://www.nasa.gov/humans-in-space/commercial-space/commercial-crew-program/commercial-crew-program-essentials/
