= Taurus KEPD 350 =

German/Swedish air-launched cruise missile

Taurus KEPD-350
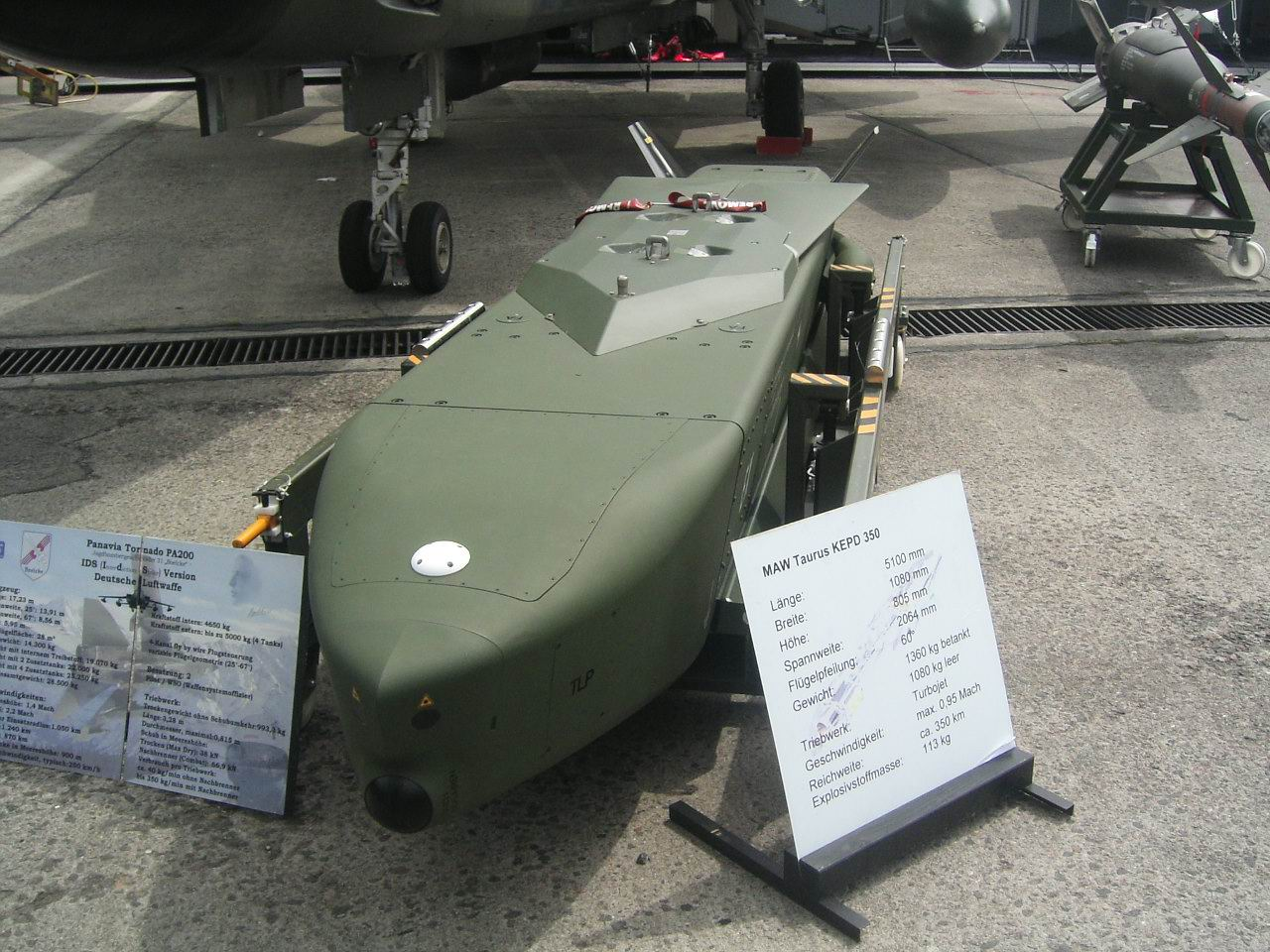
- A Taurus on display at the 2006 ILA air show
- Type: Air-launched cruise missile, Land-attack missile, Anti-ship missile
- Place of origin: Germany and Sweden

Service history
- In service: Since 2006
- Used by: Germany, South Korea, Spain

Production history
- Designer: Taurus Systems GmbH
- Designed: 1995–2005
- Manufacturer: Taurus Systems GmbH
- Produced: Since 2005
- Variants: KEPD 350; KEPD 350 MR; KEPD 350K-2; KEPD 150

Specifications (KEPD 350)
- Mass: 1,400 kg (3,100 lb)
- Length: 5.1 m (16 ft 9 in)
- Width: 1,080 mm (3 ft 7 in)
- Height: 805 mm (2 ft 7.7 in)
- Wingspan: 2.06 m (6 ft 9 in)
- Warhead: Two‐stage tandem MEPHISTO penetrator
- Warhead weight: 480 kg (1,060 lb)
- Engine: Williams P8300‐15 turbofan 680.4 kgf (6,672 N; 1,500 lbf) thrust
- Operational range: > 500 km (270 nmi; 310 mi)
- Maximum speed: Mach .95 (323 m/s; 1,060 ft/s; 1,160 km/h)
- Guidance system: INS, GPS, image-based navigation (IBN), RADALT
- Steering system: Four tailfins
- Launch platform: Panavia PA-200 Tornado IDS, McDonnell Douglas F-15K Slam Eagle, McDonnell Douglas F/A-18A+ Hornet
- References: Janes

The Taurus KEPD-350 (Note: Target Adaptive Unitary and Dispenser Robotic Ubiquity System/Kinetic Energy Penetrator and Destroyer.) is a German-Swedish air-launched cruise missile, manufactured by Taurus Systems and used by Germany, Spain, and South Korea. Taurus Systems GmbH is a partnership between MBDA Deutschland GmbH (formerly LFK) and Saab Bofors Dynamics.

== History ==
During the Cold War, Germany had unsuccessful plans to buy French Apache missiles. In 1998, Germany funded the development of a powered system to be designated KEPD-350 with the acronym TAURUS (Target Adaptive Unitary and dispensor Robotic Ubiquity System).

== Overview ==
The missile incorporates stealth technology and has an official range in excess of 500 km (300 mi). It is powered by a turbofan engine. It can operate at Mach 0.95 and can be carried by Panavia PA-200 Tornado IDS, McDonnell Douglas EF-18A+ Hornet, and McDonnell Douglas F-15K Slam Eagle aircraft.

The dual stage 480-kilogram (1,100 lb) warhead, called MEPHISTO (multi-effect penetrator highly sophisticated and target optimised), features a precharge and initial penetrating charge to clear soil or enter "hard and deeply buried targets" (HDBT) such as hardened underground bunkers, then a variable delay fuze to control detonation of the main warhead. The missile weighs about 1,400 kg (3,100 lb) and has a maximum body diameter of 1 metre (3.3 ft). Intended targets are hardened bunkers; command, control, and communications facilities; airfield and port facilities; ammunition storage facilities; ships in port or at sea; area target attack; and bridges.

== Operation ==
Mission planners program the missile with the target, air defence locations and planned ground path. The missile uses a terrain-hugging flight path, guided by inertial navigation system (INS), image based navigation (IBN), terrain referenced navigation (TRN), and Global Positioning System (GPS) to the target. It is capable of navigating over long distances without GPS support.

Upon arrival the missile commences a climb followed by a bunt (dive) manoeuvre to achieve the best probability of target acquisition and penetration. During the cruise portion of the flight, a high resolution thermographic camera (infrared homing) can support navigation by using IBN and for GPS-free target attack. The missile attempts to match a camera image with the planned 3D target model (Digital Scene Matching Area Correlator, DSMAC). If it cannot, it defaults to the other navigation systems, or, to avoid collateral damage, it steers to a pre-designated crash point instead of risking an inaccurate attack.

== Export ==
Spain's military bought 45 missiles. Integration of the missile in Spanish Air Force service was certified by completing a dedicated test campaign in South Africa in May 2009.

In 2013, South Korea planned to order 200 missiles to integrate with their F-15K Slam Eagles after it was prevented from acquiring Lockheed Martin's AGM-158 JASSM by the United States. The Defense Acquisition Program Administration (DAPA) signed the deal in November 2013. The KEPD 350 was the first European missile to be integrated onto a South Korean fighter. In October 2016, South Korea announced it would acquire a further 90 missiles, in addition to the 170 previously ordered, in response to North Korean nuclear and missile provocations. On 12 December 2016, the first 40 Taurus KEPD 350K missiles were delivered to the ROKAF.

In May 2023, the German Federal Ministry of Defence said that Ukraine had requested the missile during the ongoing Russian invasion of Ukraine. In interviews in June and July 2023, German Chancellor Olaf Scholz and Minister of Defense Boris Pistorius said that Germany would not supply Ukraine with long-range missiles. In January 2024, the German Bundestag voted against the supply of the Taurus missile to Ukraine. In February 2024, the German Bundestag and Chancellor Olaf Scholz again expressly refused Ukraine's request while agreeing to deliver longer range weapons. In May 2025, newly elected chancellor Friedrich Merz made more ambiguous statements regarding Taurus, that their delivery to Ukraine was within the 'realm of possibility' and that the discussion about their delivery to Ukraine would not be public. On 5 November 2026 President Volodymyr Zelenskyy stated that Taurus missiles could be useful for destroying Russian ballistic missile launch sites.

=== Taurus leak ===
In February 2024, there was a discussion among Luftwaffe officers as to how the system could be delivered to Ukraine to target the Crimean Bridge. The Inspector of the Air Force, Generalleutnant Ingo Gerhartz, and three other high-ranking officers prepared a briefing for Chancellor Olaf Scholz on the topic at an online meeting. The conversation was conducted via Webex. A Russian intelligence service, media suspect the GRU, is reported to have intercepted the conversation and published it on the state-controlled channel RT-Deutsch. An English translation of the transcript of the conversation was later posted online, though like various news reports it contains a number of errors.

The leak was followed by a public debate about countering Russian espionage in Germany. MAD started investigations.

== Variants ==
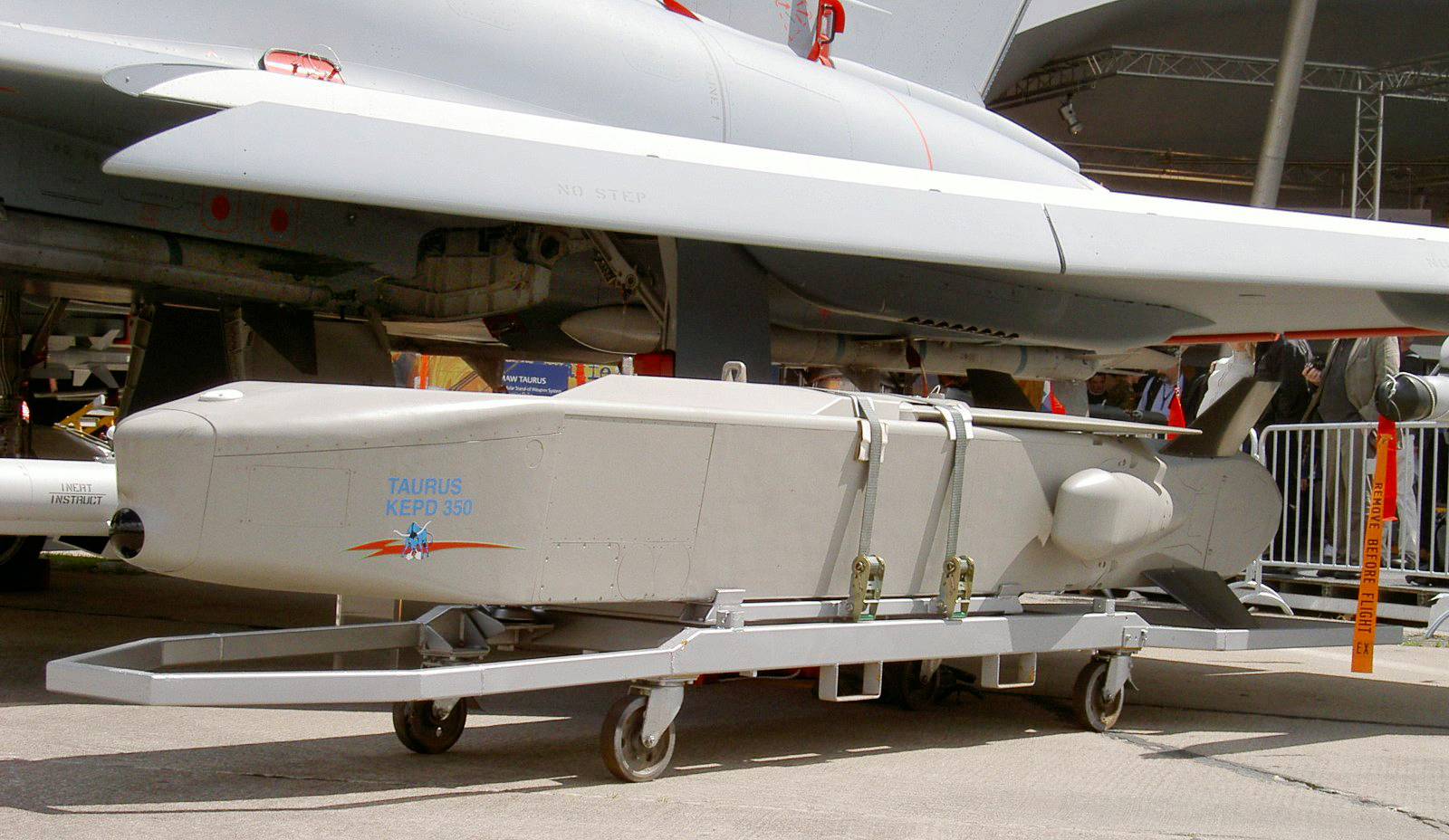
A Taurus KEPD 350 cruise missile at the ILA air show near Berlin in 2004.

=== KEPD 350K ===
The variant for the ROKAF differs from the baseline model by being equipped with a Rockwell Collins GPS receiver with a Selective Availability Anti-Spoofing Module (SAASM) to prevent jamming.

=== KEPD 350K-2 ===
In October 2015, Taurus Systems revealed it was developing a smaller version of the Taurus missile, called the 350K-2, for use on light fighters, particularly the South Korean FA-50 Block 20 variant of the KAI T-50 Golden Eagle. It is shorter at 4.5 m (15 ft) in length and lighter, weighing 907 kg (2,000 lb) while matching speed and range.

In December 2016, South Korea's Defense Acquisition Program Administration (DAPA) announced plans to start development on a long-range air-to-ground missile in 2018, based on Taurus. The weapon was to be mounted on the KAI KF-21 Boramae fighter, to be developed by the mid-2020s.

=== Taurus Neo ===
On 27 October 2024, Boris Pistorius (German Defence Minister) announced a next generation Taurus missile called the Taurus Neo. With plans to purchase 600 units costing some €2.1 billion with deliveries starting in 2029. The Taurus Neo will include a range over 500 kms, a more powerful warhead and better guidance. 300 million euros would be required in 2025 to start the program.

The programme was approved in December 2025. And the contract for the development of the new standard was also signed.

== Operators ==
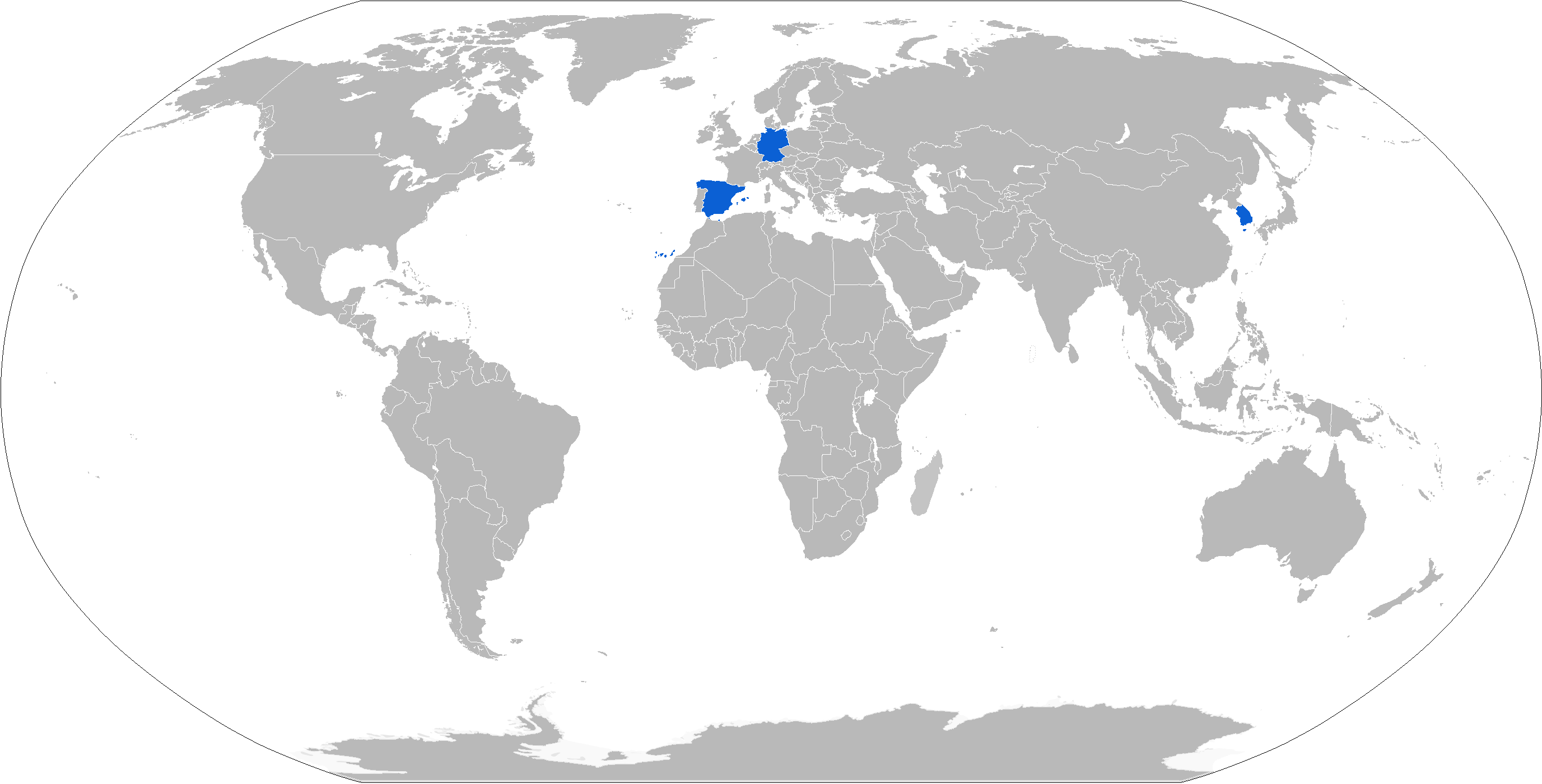
Map with KEPD 350 operators in blue

=== Current operators ===
Germany
Orders:
- Taurus: 600 ordered for the Luftwaffe's Panavia PA-200 Tornado IDS and Eurofighter Typhoon EF-2000 at a cost of €570 million. Deliveries ended in December 2010.
- Taurus NEO: Ordered in December 2025, estimate of 600 missiles.
Spain
43 ordered for the Spanish Air Force's McDonnell Douglas EF-18A+ Hornets and Eurofighter Typhoon EF-2000. Deliveries ended in August 2010. The program cost €60 million.
South Korea
177 ordered in 2013, delivered in 2016–2017, 90 ordered in 2018, delivered in 2019–2020, and to be operated from the Republic of Korea Air Force's McDonnell Douglas F-15K Slam Eagle fighter jets.

=== Orders ===
Germany
Germany approved the purchase of the Taurus Neo was approved in December 2025 for the Eurofighter.
Sweden
On 24 February 2025 it was announced that the Swedish Air Force was equipping the multirole JAS 39 Gripen with Taurus. This missile is planned to be operational with the Swedish Air Force by 2028.

=== Potential orders ===
Spain
Additional orders expected in 2026.
Turkey
As part of the order of the Eurofighter by Turkey, the Taurus is expected to be ordered.

== See also ==
- AGM-158 JASSM – American low observable air-launched cruise missile
- Brahmos – Indian cruise missile
- CJ-10 – Chinese cruise missile
- Fateh Mobin – Iranian short-range ballistic missile
- HOPE/HOSBO – German family of precision-guided glide bombs
- Joint Strike Missile – Norwegian/American air-launched cruise missile
- KALCM Cheonryong – South Korean air-launched cruise missile
- KD-88 – Chinese anti-ship cruise missile
- Ra'ad – Pakistani air-launched cruise missile
- Ra'ad-II – Pakistani air-launched cruise missile
- SOM (missile) – Turkish air-launched cruise missile
- Storm Shadow – Franco-British cruise missile
- Wan Chien – Taiwanese air-launched cruise missile
- YJ-22 – Chinese cruise missile
