= German Taurus leak =

2024 military communications leak

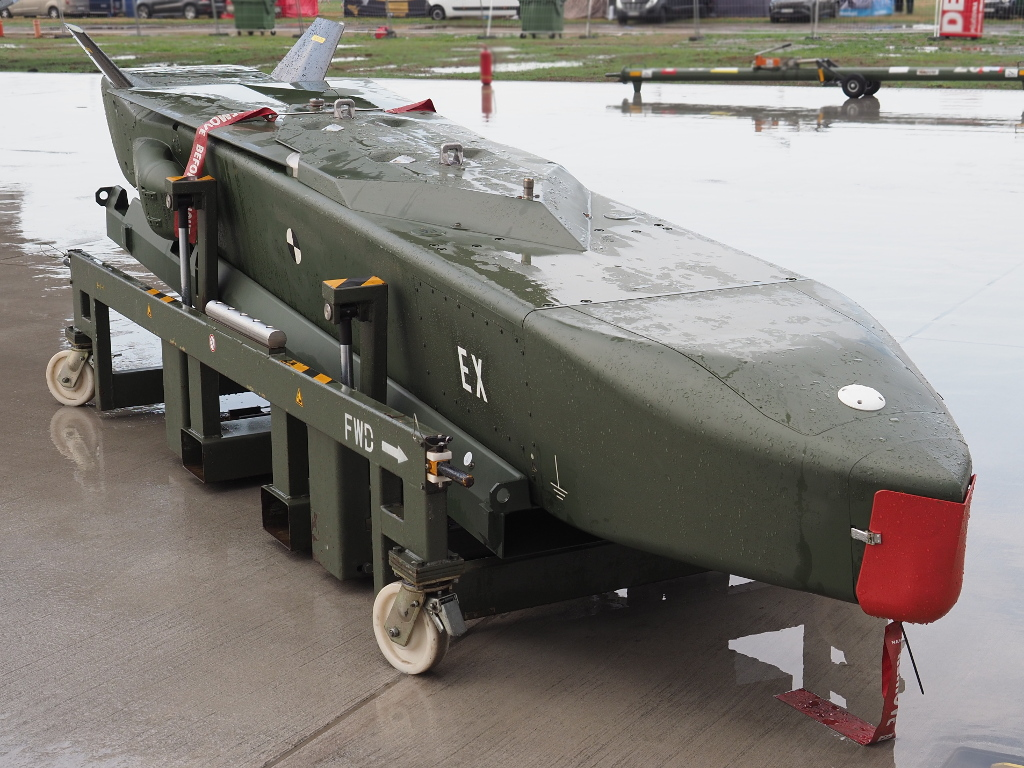
A Taurus KEPD-350 missile (2022)

The German Taurus leak was a military communications leak in 2024 that resulted from Russia's interception of a supposedly top-secret webconference of German airforce officials about the possible supply of German Taurus cruise missiles to Ukraine and about operational scenarios in the Russian-Ukrainian War.

Margarita Simonyan, the editor-in-chief of Russia's RT channel, released the 38-minute recording on Telegram and VK on 1 March 2024. Germany confirmed the recording was of a real conversation but said it couldn't rule out that the recording might have been edited; Chancellor Olaf Scholz promised a swift investigation.

The leak of the conversation between lieutenant general Ingo Gerhartz, commander of the Luftwaffe, and three subordinates was profoundly embarrassing to the Bundeswehr – it caused a political scandal and was seen as a propaganda coup for Russia. Among the topics the officials discussed in their conversation, conducted using standard commercial Cisco Webex video conferencing software, were the presence of UK and US military personnel in Ukraine and the potential use of Taurus missiles to blow up the Crimean Bridge.

== Background ==
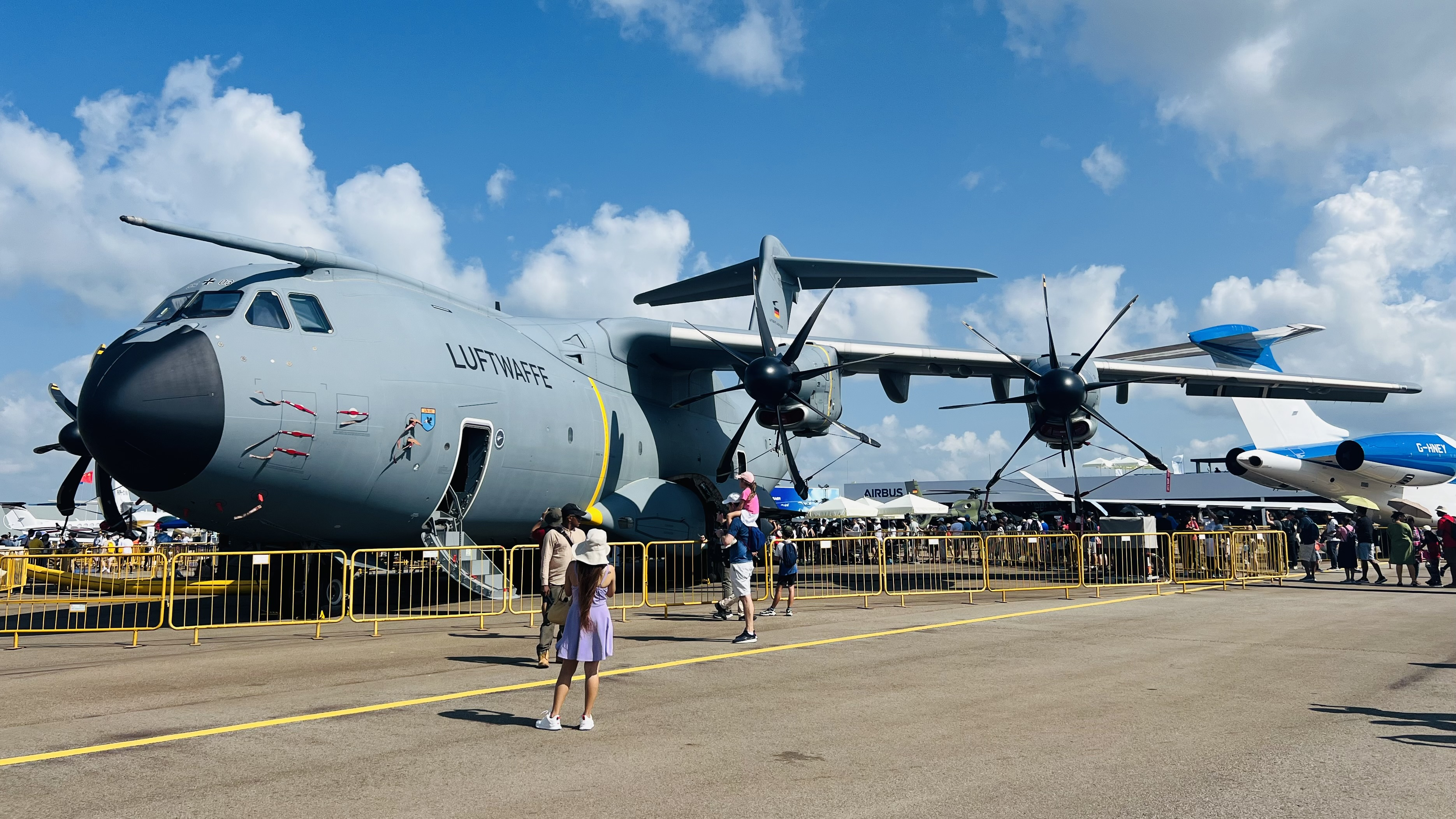
The Luftwaffe at the 2024 Singapore Airshow

On 19 February, Gerhartz and his subordinates were discussing an upcoming briefing to bring German Defense minister Boris Pistorius up to speed on Taurus. One of the officials participated from Singapore, where he was attending the biennial military Singapore Airshow, and joined the conversation via Cisco Webex from his hotel, the use of which is authorised in the German armed forces up to the "Classified – for official use only" level of secrecy ("Verschlusssache – Nur für den Dienstgebrauch" or "VS-NfD"). German investigators subsequently concluded this was the weak link enabling the call to be intercepted.

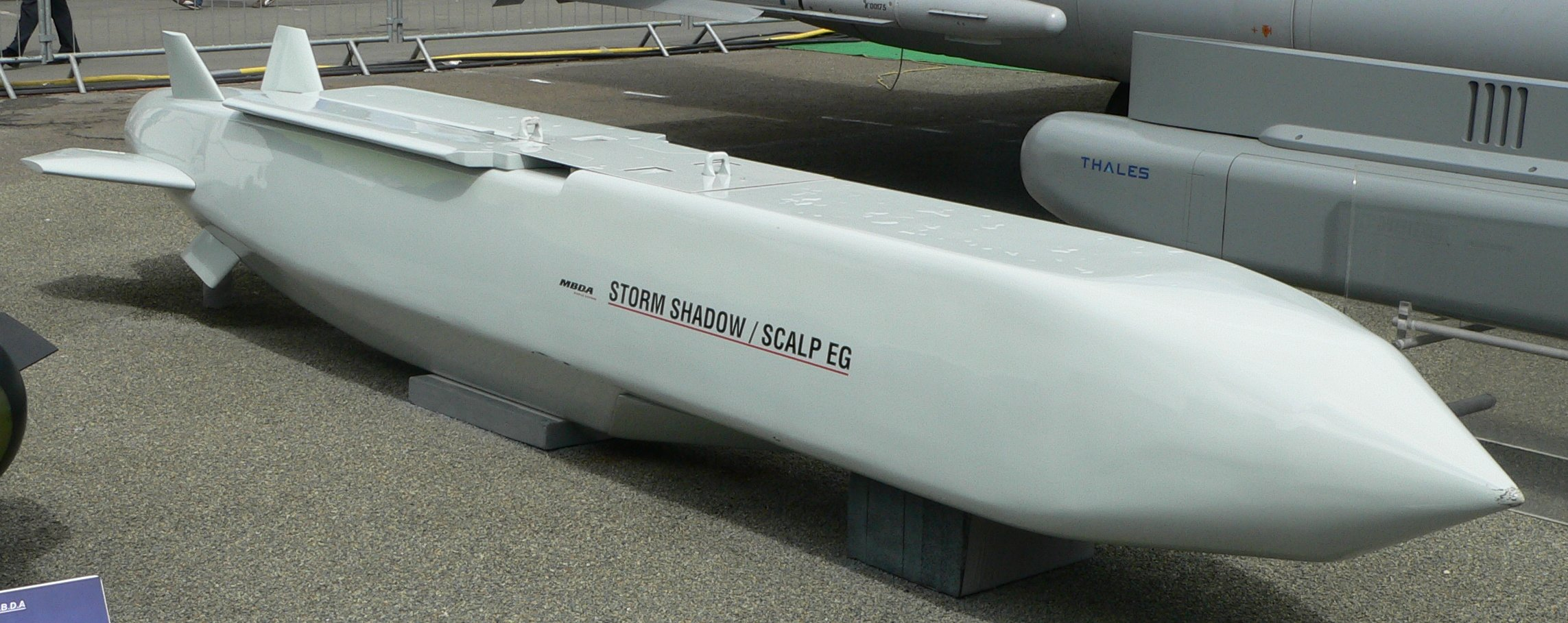
The Franco-British Storm Shadow/SCALP missile

A week after the intercepted 19 February conversation, and a few days prior to the 1 March leak of the audio file, German Chancellor Olaf Scholz – under mounting pressure to approve the delivery of long-range Taurus cruise missiles to Ukraine – caused controversy by indicating that British soldiers were helping Ukraine fire the Storm Shadow/SCALP cruise missiles supplied by United Kingdom and France, which are less precise than the Taurus and are thought to have either a shorter or a similar range to the Taurus, depending on the precise version supplied to Ukraine. Scholz argued that Germany would not be able to follow the example of the UK and France: "This [the Taurus] is a very far-reaching weapon, and what the British and French are doing in terms of target control and support for target control cannot be done in Germany. Everyone who has looked at this system understands that." "German soldiers can at no point and in no place be linked with the targets that this system [the Taurus] reaches. Not even in Germany," Scholz said. Following the UK's example would make Germany a "participant in the war". The degree of German involvement required was one of the topics Gerhartz and his subordinates discussed in the intercepted conversation.

== Content ==
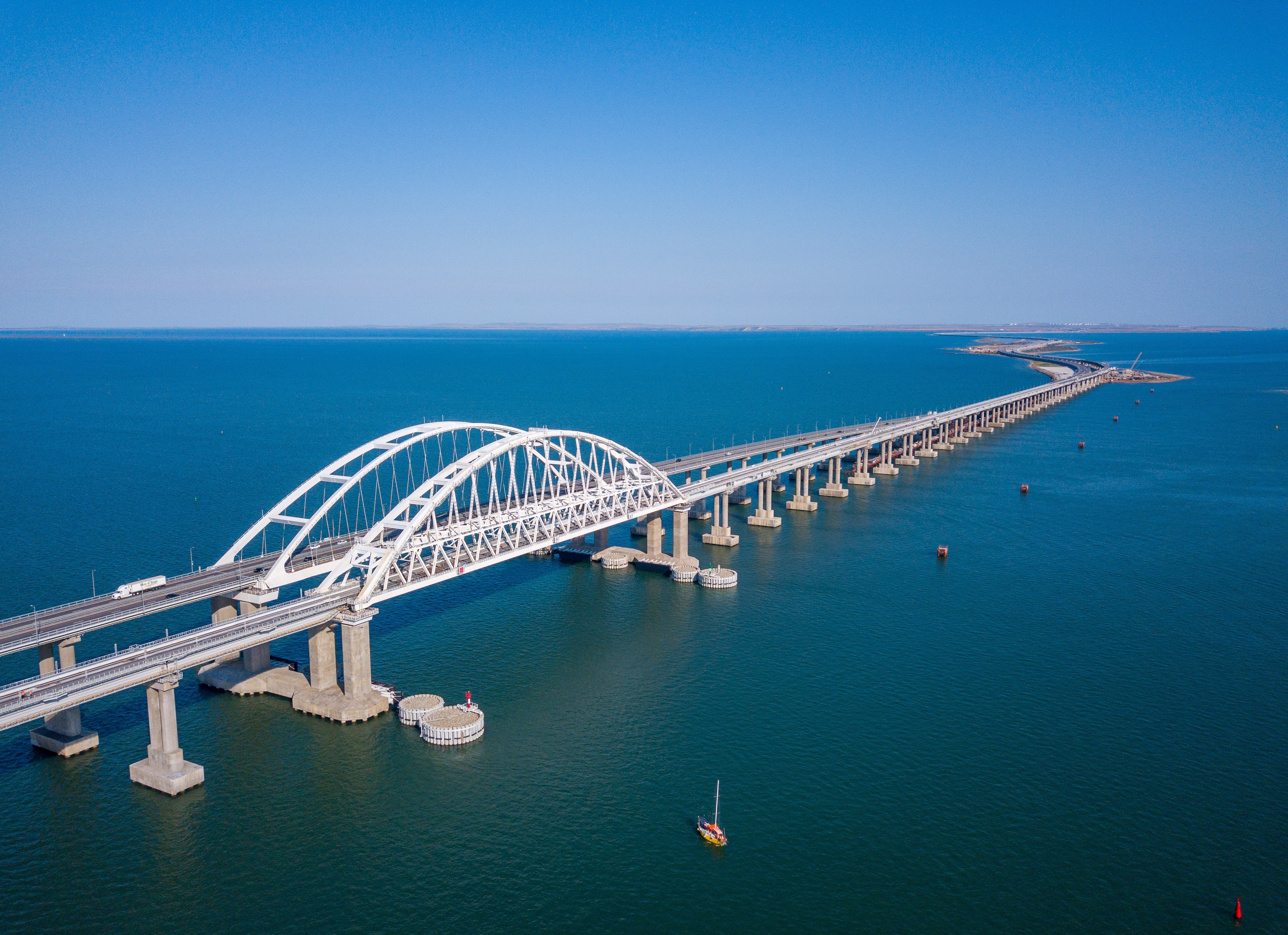
The Crimean Bridge was discussed in the leaked conversation as a potential target.

Gerhartz and his subordinates discussed how much Taurus training and support Germany might need to provide if Taurus missiles were sent to Ukraine, and whether this would include targeting and programming information. Gerhartz said there was confusion about Scholz's position: "No one knows why the federal chancellor is blocking the dispatch of the missiles – this gives rise to all sorts of outlandish rumours." The officials mentioned France and the UK, noting that the latter have soldiers in Ukraine advising the Ukrainian military on bombing decisions.

Gerhartz said: ″When it comes to mission planning, for example, I know how the British do it, they do it completely in reachback [i.e. with support from people who are not forward-deployed]. They also have a few people on the ground, they do that, the French don't. So, they also QC the Ukrainians when loading the SCALP, because Storm Shadow and SCALPS are relatively similar from a purely technical point of view. They've already told me that, yes, for God's sake, they would also look over the shoulders of the Ukrainians when loading the Taurus. But the question is, how do we solve that? Do we let them do the mission planning and give them MBDA as a reachback and then put one of our people in MBDA?″

The participants discussed using the defense contractor MBDA in Schrobenhausen as a go-between to send targeting data or to drive the targeting data file by car to Poland – "someone could drive back and forth," one of them suggested. Another cautioned against pitching such ideas to Pistorius because it would scupper the project right away: "We have to be careful that we don't articulate any kill criteria at the beginning," he said. “Imagine what would happen if the press were to catch wind of this!" Such problems, it was argued, could possibly be avoided by involving the US or UK: “We know there are a lot of people with American accents running [around] in civilian clothes [at the Ukrainian command],” one of the officers said. The Crimean Bridge was discussed as a potential target for a Taurus strike – 10 or 20 Taurus missiles might be enough to destroy it, the experts thought.

=== Translation errors ===
Translations of the audio quoted in English news reports featured a number of errors, some of which were backtranslated into German and entered reports by German news providers such as Tagesschau. The reference to mission planning by "reachback", for example, meaning consultation of British personnel stationed in Britain, turned into a missile transport using "armoured Ridgeback vehicles". The reference to QC, short for quality control, turned into reports that the French were transporting missiles in Audi Q7 SUV vehicles.

== Responses ==
=== Germany ===
Germany confirmed the recording was authentic but said it couldn't rule out that it might have been edited; Chancellor Olaf Scholz described the leak as "very serious" and promised a swift investigation. The German government sought to portray the officials' exchanges as a sort of war-gaming that is an integral part of military officers' jobs, saying the real scandal was Putin's "information war".

August Hanning, a former German intelligence chief, said the leak could merely be "the tip of the iceberg" and that more NATO secrets may have been compromised. German defence politician Joe Weingarten thought the officers' conduct was "unprofessional" and said he considered it "highly problematic how the leadership of the air force is chatting about a key security policy issue in such a light-hearted casino tone", adding that a sensitive issue like the delivery of German cruise missiles to the Ukrainian war zone required "much more professional planning and decision-making processes".

German Defence Minister Boris Pistorius said on 5 March that "Our communication systems have not been compromised. The reason the air force call could nonetheless be recorded was because of an individual's operational mistake," referring to one of the other participants who had joined the discussion with Gerhartz from Singapore. Asked about the position of Gerhartz himself, Pistorius said if the investigation revealed nothing further, then he would not "sacrifice one of my best officers to (Russian President Vladimir) Putin's games".

=== Russia ===
Former Russian President and Prime Minister Dmitry Medvedev said on social media: "Our historic adversaries, the Germans, have once again turned into our archenemies.” Kremlin spokesperson Dmitry Peskov said: "In the bowels of the Bundeswehr [German army] plans for strikes on Russian territory are being discussed in a substantive and concrete manner." Russia summoned Germany's ambassador to the foreign ministry.

=== United Kingdom ===
A spokesperson for UK Prime Minister Rishi Sunak told reporters: “It’s obviously a matter for Germany to investigate and you’ve got Chancellor Scholz’s words on this. I think he said that it’s clearly a very serious matter, and that’s why it’s now being investigated very carefully." Former British Defence Secretary Ben Wallace told The Times, "We know Germany is pretty penetrated by Russian intelligence so it just demonstrates they are neither secure nor reliable." Alec Shelbrooke, a former UK Minister of State for Defence Procurement, described the leak as an "amateur blunder" on Germany's part, while Conservative MP Bob Seely called Germany "incredibly complacent".

Tobias Ellwood, a former junior defence minister, said that Russia probably already knew about the British presence in Ukraine. In fact, the UK itself had confirmed the presence of a "small number of personnel" in Ukraine to the public on 27 February 2024, although without saying what tasks they were undertaking, as it was feared any combat involvement could be considered as escalatory. The UK affirmed that it had no plans for a large-scale deployment of troops in Ukraine.

Former Whitehall insiders told The Guardian the Ministry of Defence would probably be irritated by the leak, although it was too general to do real damage. Indeed, one of the UK government's first responses was not to complain but to press Scholz again: "The UK was the first country to provide long-range precision strike missiles to Ukraine, and we would encourage our allies to do the same." Guardian columnist Simon Jenkins wrote that the leak "boosted Vladimir Putin’s claim that this is a war of the west against Russia, with Ukraine as mere proxy."

== Further incidents ==
In February 2025 the Russian comedy duo Vovan and Lexus called Johann Wadephul, a representative of the German Parliament and member of the Christian Democratic Union of Germany, pretending to be employees of the Ukrainian president Volodymyr Zelenskyy. In the 20 minute call, Wadephul leaked information about military support and the delivery of Taurus cruise missiles.
