= HN1 =

HN1 or HN-1 may refer to:

- HN1, a previous symbol for a human gene; the current symbol is JPT1
- HN1 (nitrogen mustard), bis(2-chloroethyl)ethylamine, a chemical warfare agent
- HN-1, a Chinese Hongniao series rocket
