= KALCM Cheonryong =

South Korean air-launched cruise missile

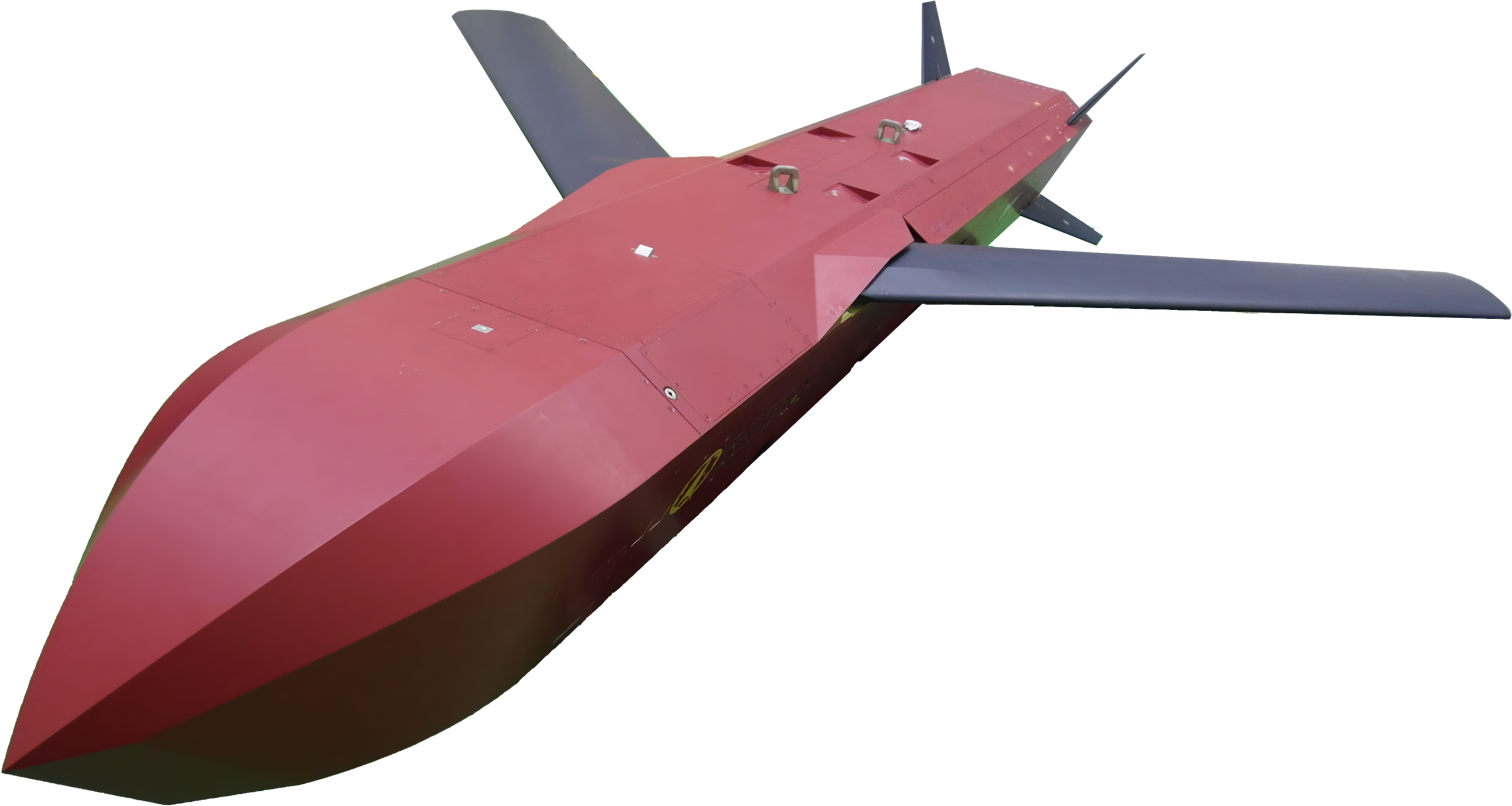
- KALCM demonstrative prototype developed by Agency for Defense Development (ADD)
- Type: Air-launched cruise missile
- Place of origin: South Korea

Service history
- In service: 2031 (planned)
- Used by: South Korea

Production history
- Designer: Agency for Defense Development; LIG Defense & Aerospace
- Designed: 2018–2028 (planned)
- Manufacturer: LIG Defense & Aerospace (final assembly); Hanwha Aerospace (Engine assembly)
- Produced: 2028 (planned)
- No. built: 200 (planned)

Specifications
- Mass: 1,360 kilograms (3,000 lb)
- Length: 4.64 meters (15 ft 3 in)
- Warhead: Two stage tandem penetrator
- Engine: hanwha aero turbofan
- Operational range: >500 km (310 mi)
- Maximum speed: >Mach 1 (340 m/s; 1,200 km/h)
- Guidance system: DSMAC, TERCOM, GNSS, INS, IIR (IBN, ATR)
- Steering system: Four tailfins
- Accuracy: 1.5 meters (4 ft 11 in) CEP
- Launch platform: McDonnell Douglas F-4 Phantom II, KAI FA-50 Fighting Eagle, KAI KF-21 Boramae

The KALCM Cheonryong (Korean Air-Launched Cruise Missile; Korean: 한국형 장거리 공대지 유도탄; Hanja: 韓國型長距離空對地誘導彈), or often called Cheonryong (Celestial Dragon; Korean: 천룡; Hanja: 天龍), is a South Korean air-launched cruise missile, manufactured by LIG Defense & Aerospace (LIG D&A) and Hanwha Aerospace. Featuring a dual warhead structure and enhanced stealth design, it effectively combines the strengths of the Taurus KEPD 350 and AGM-158 JASSM.

== History ==
The KALCM Cheonryong long-range cruise missile is being developed under the leadership of South Korea’s Agency for Defense Development (ADD), with industrial participation from LIG Defense & Aerospace (former LIG Nex1) and Hanwha Aerospace. The program was initiated following South Korea’s acquisition of 260 Taurus missiles from Germany, which provided limited technology transfer. This includes high-resistance metal processing for penetrator warheads, facilitated through KSC, a subsidiary of Woori Technology, which began domestic production of Taurus penetrator components in 2019. The penetrator warhead technology is integrated into a new missile platform, leveraging LIG D&A's guidance systems and Hanwha Aerospace's engine technology, all overseen by the Agency for Defense Development.

Often described as a domestically evolved counterpart to the Taurus KEPD 350, the Cheonryong is intended to supplement imported systems and address a projected shortfall of up to 600 long-range missiles in the Republic of Korea Air Force (ROKAF) inventory.

== Operational Overview ==

1	A Cheonryong missile is launched after separating from the aircraft.
2	To correct errors in flight trajectories, the digital scene matching area correlator (DSMAC) system is used to scan the surrounding terrain in real time.
3	To compensate for errors in the missile's inertial navigation system (INS), the terrain contour matching (TERCOM) system is used to measure the distance between the missile and the ground surface.

4	Stealth maneuver to avoid detection of enemy air defense systems.
5	When the missile reaches the coordinates where the enemy target is located, the terminal guidance system is activated and then descends vertically.
6	A missile descending on a steep trajectory strikes the target.

The Cheonryong is an air-launched cruise missile with an estimated range of 500 to 800 km, offering greater reach despite being smaller and lighter than the Taurus. It employs a dual-stage penetrator warhead capable of penetrating up to 8 meters of reinforced concrete, making it a true bunker-buster. Cheonryong uses a hybrid precision guidance system that integrates TERCOM, GNSS, INS, and Imaging Infrared (IIR) with Image-Based Navigation (IBN) and Automatic Target Recognition (ATR), achieving a circular error probable (CEP) of just 1–2 meters. Designed for low-altitude, terrain-following flight, the missile features a stealth-optimized airframe and radar-absorbent coatings, minimizing its chances of detection or interception by enemy air defenses. Unlike the Taurus, which requires pre-flight fueling, the Cheonryong can be stored fully fueled for 5 to 10 years, ensuring rapid deployment readiness in emergencies.

== Development ==
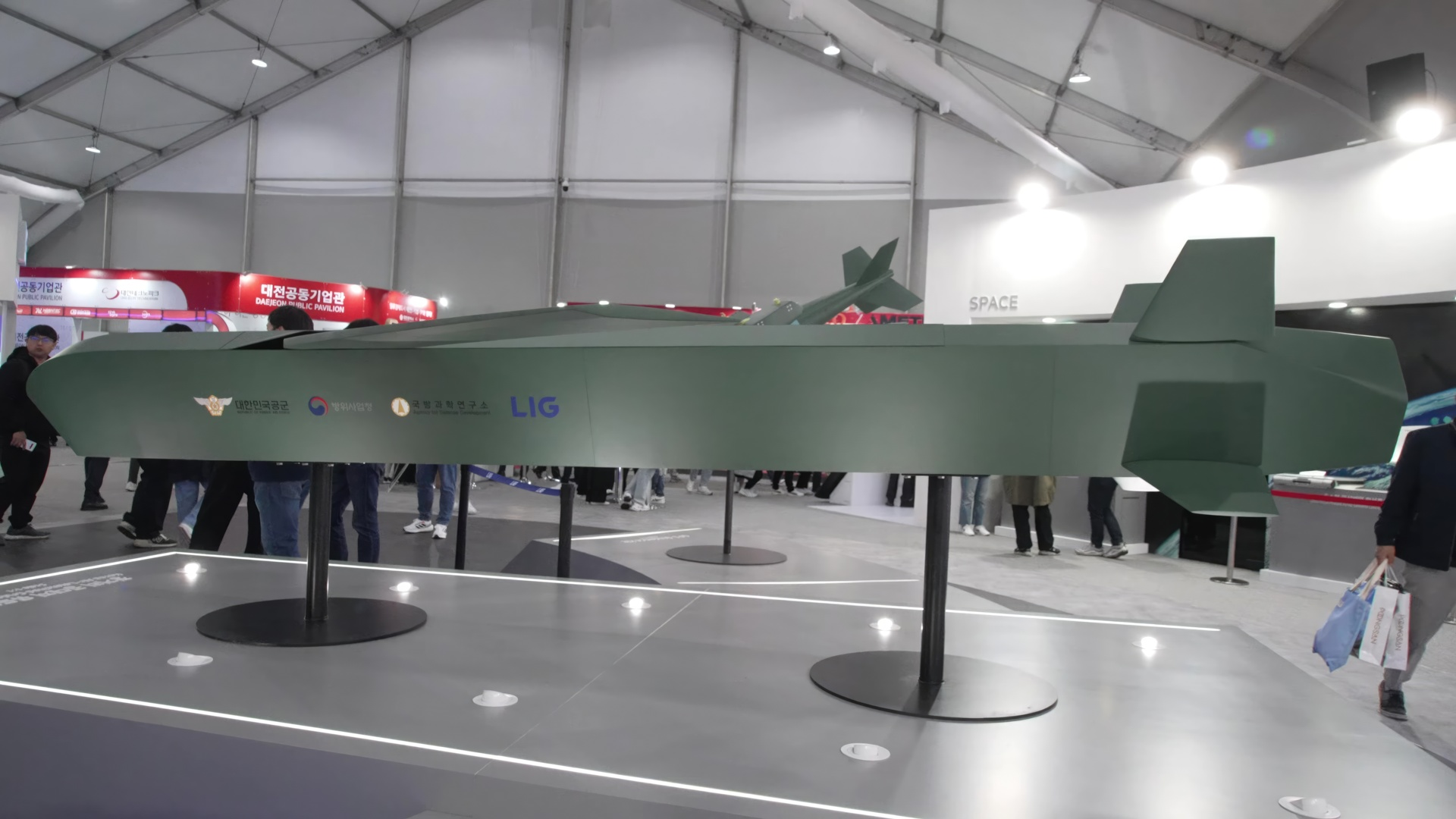
KALCM on display at the ADEX 2023

The development of the missile has been allocated a total budget of 810 billion KRW (approximately $550.8 million USD), including 300 billion KRW ($204 million) for system development and 500 billion KRW ($340 million) for mass production. A total of 200 units are planned to be produced by 2031, with initial deployment scheduled for 2028, followed by serial production beginning in 2029 or 2030.

On October 15, 2019, a full-scale model of LIG Nex1’s Long-Range Air-to-Ground Guided Missile II was unveiled at ADEX 2019.

On October 19, 2021, during Seoul ADEX 2021, it was announced that the missile would be named “Cheonryong”, meaning “Celestial Dragon” in Korean.

From August to September 2021, a total of three separation tests were conducted using F-4 Phantom II fighters, all of which were reportedly successful. On September 15, 2021, the Agency for Defense Development announced that the Cheonryong missile had successfully separated from a flying F-4 Phantom II, deployed its wings, and struck the target with stability.

On March 25, 2022, it was decided during the 142nd Defense Acquisition Program Committee meeting that the development of the long-range air-to-ground cruise missile would be led by the Agency for Defense Development (ADD).

On December 12, 2022, the South Korean Ministry of National Defense announced that the exploratory development phase of the long-range air-to-ground missile project has been completed and that it is now at a stage where system development can begin. In other words, the necessary technologies for development have been largely secured, and the project has reached the starting point where a prototype can be produced through system development to verify the completion of the overall development.

On January 30, 2025, two mock-ups of the Cheonryong missile being tested on the FA-50 were spotted by a Malaysian Twitter user but later removed.

On June 23, 2025, South Korea’s Defense Acquisition Program Administration (DAPA) announced that a safe separation flight test of the domestically developed long-range air-to-ground missile had been successfully conducted using the FA-50 light combat aircraft. According to DAPA, the test confirmed that the missile could safely detach from the aircraft without interfering with the airframe or external stores, and that its separation did not negatively impact the aircraft’s flight performance. The missile, guided by inertial and satellite navigation systems, flew approximately 9 kilometers over a 37-second period and accurately impacted the designated target. DAPA stated that this test followed 31 integration sorties since April 2025, which assessed flutter characteristics and flight control stability. The missile is part of the Long-Range Air-to-Ground Guided Missile Phase II program, aimed at enabling precision strikes against high-value targets when mounted on the KF-21 fighter. DAPA further outlined plans to begin KF-21 integration testing in 2027, with subsequent development and operational testing to validate the missile’s combat capabilities.

== Variants ==
The KALCM Cheonryong cruise missile is being developed in two variants for integration on both the KF-21 Boramae and the FA-50 Fighting Eagle aircraft. While visually identical, these variants differ in their internal fuel storage to adjust for the weight limitations of each platform. The variant for the KF-21 is designed to support a range of over 500 km, leveraging the fighter's greater carrying capacity. In contrast, the FA-50's variant has a reduced fuel load, which limits its range to over 350 km, accommodating the lighter fighter's weight constraints while still providing a significant long-range strike capability. Both aircraft can carry two of the KALCM missiles. This fuel adjustment feature allows the missile to be adapted to a wide range of aircraft based on their specific weight limits.

== Operators ==
=== Future operators ===
South Korea

- At least 200 units are planned for deployment by 2031.

== See also ==
- Taurus KEPD 350 – German/Swedish air-launched cruise missile
- Storm Shadow – Franco-British cruise missile
- AGM-158 JASSM – American low observable air-launched cruise missile
