= YJ-22 =

Chinese cruise missile

The YJ-22 is a LACM (land-attack cruise missile) development of the anti-ship C-802 with a 400 km range, and possible Satellite guidance/terrain mapping guidance currently said to be under development, Initial Operational Capability was expected after 2005. This 135-kilometer range system would be the first Chinese cruise missile to incorporate BeiDou Navigation Satellite System-assisted navigation. Satellite-aided guidance could be augmented by terrain contour matching TERCOM (Terrain Contour Matching) guidance. Some sources believe BeiDou-aided navigation could result in cruise missiles like the YJ-22 to achieve accuracies of up to 10 meters.
