= Storm Shadow =

Franco-British cruise missile

Storm Shadow/SCALP EG
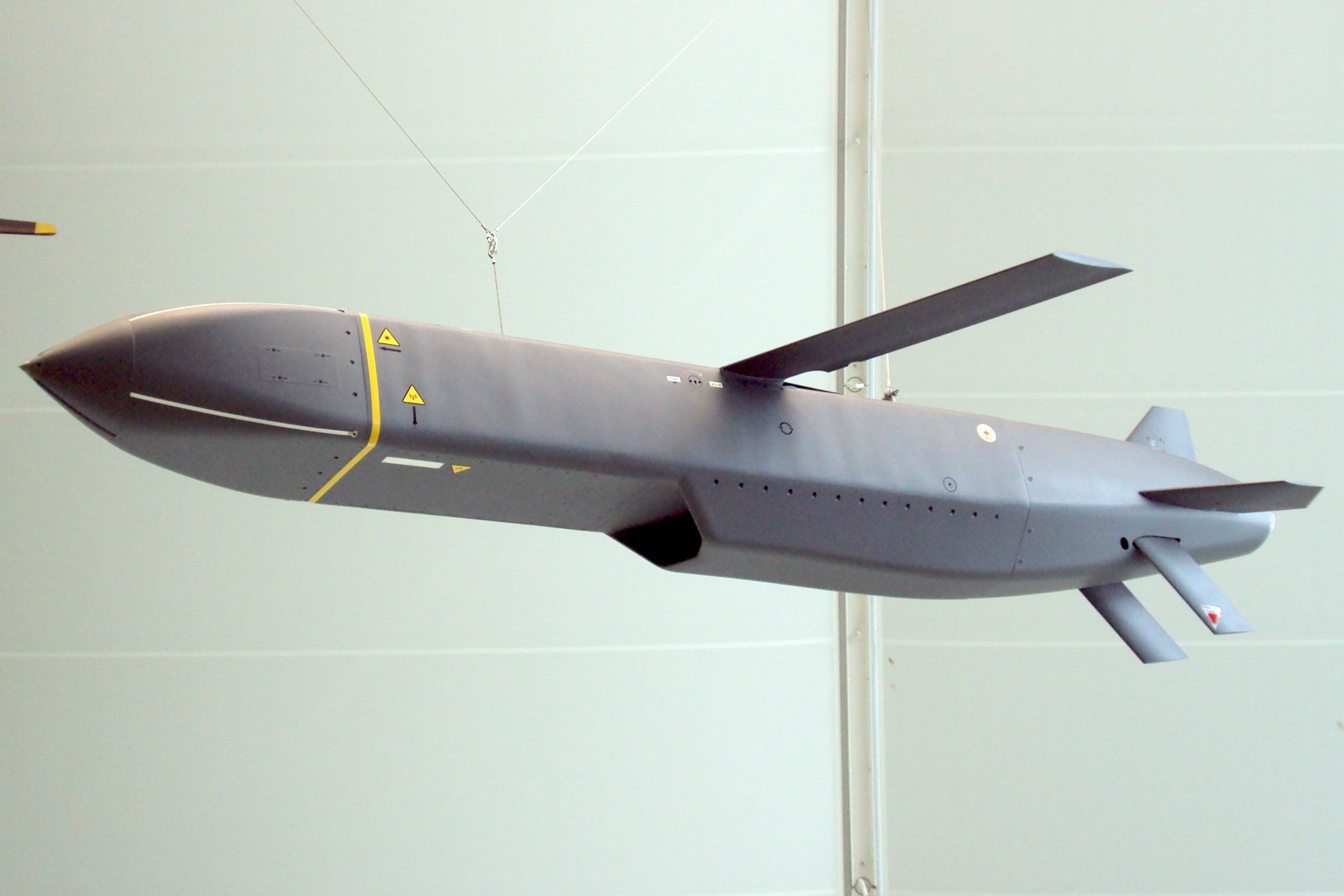
- A missile displayed in the Royal Air Force Museum, London
- Type: Air-launched cruise missile
- Place of origin: France; United Kingdom

Service history
- In service: 2003–present
- Used by: See operators
- Wars: Iraq War; Libyan Civil War; 2011 military intervention in Libya; Syrian Civil War; US intervention in the Syrian civil war; Yemeni Civil War; Russo-Ukrainian War; Russian invasion of Ukraine; 2025 India–Pakistan conflict

Production history
- Designer: Matra BAe Dynamics
- Designed: 1994–2001
- Manufacturer: MBDA
- Unit cost: £2,000,000 (FY2023) (US$2,500,000)

Specifications
- Mass: 1,300 kg (2,900 lb)
- Length: 5.1 m (16 ft 9 in)
- Width: 630 mm (25 in)
- Height: 480 mm (19 in)
- Wingspan: 3 m (9 ft 10 in)
- Warhead: Multistage BROACH penetration warhead
- Warhead weight: 450 kilograms (990 lb)
- Engine: Microturbo TRI 60-30 turbojet 5.4 kN (1,200 lb_{f})
- Operational range: 550 km (342 mi; 297 nmi)
- Maximum speed: Mach 0.95 (323 m/s; 1,060 ft/s)
- Guidance system: GPS, INS, IIR & TERPROM
- Steering system: 6 tailplanes (4 vertical & 2 horizontal)
- Launch platform: Mirage 2000; Dassault Rafale; Su-24 Fencer; Panavia Tornado; Eurofighter Typhoon; Saab JAS 39 Gripen
- References: Janes & The Telegraph

The Storm Shadow is a Franco–British low-observable, long-range air-launched cruise missile developed since 1994 by Matra and British Aerospace, and now manufactured by MBDA. "Storm Shadow" is the weapon's British name; in France it is called SCALP-EG (which stands for "Système de Croisière Autonome à Longue Portée – Emploi Général"; English: "Long Range Autonomous Cruise Missile System – General Purpose"). The missile is based on the French-developed Apache anti-runway cruise missile, but differs in that it carries a unitary warhead instead of cluster munitions.

To meet the requirement issued by the French Ministry of Defence for a more potent cruise missile capable of being launched from surface vessels and submarines, and able to strike strategic and military targets from extended standoff ranges with even greater precision, MBDA France began development of the Missile de Croisière Naval ("Naval Cruise Missile") or MdCN in 2006 to complement the SCALP. The first firing test took place in July 2013 and was successful. The MdCN has been operational on French FREMM frigates since 2017 and also equips France's Barracuda nuclear attack submarines, which entered operational service in 2022. However, MdCN is not a derivative of the Storm Shadow, but a distinct missile.

In 2017, a joint contract to upgrade the Storm Shadow/SCALP stockpiles in French and British service was signed. It is expected to sustain the missile until its planned withdrawal from service in 2032. France, the UK and Italy are together developing the Stratus missile family to replace SCALP/Storm Shadow and each nation's respective anti-ship missiles by 2028 and 2034.

Since 2023, during the Russian invasion of Ukraine, Storm Shadow missiles have been supplied to Ukraine in large quantities. Multiple Russian ships have been either sunk or heavily damaged by them. On 10 July 2025, MBDA announced that it was resuming production of SCALP/Storm Shadow missiles in 2025, some 15 years since receiving the last order, with the possibility of more missiles being supplied to Ukraine.

== Characteristics ==
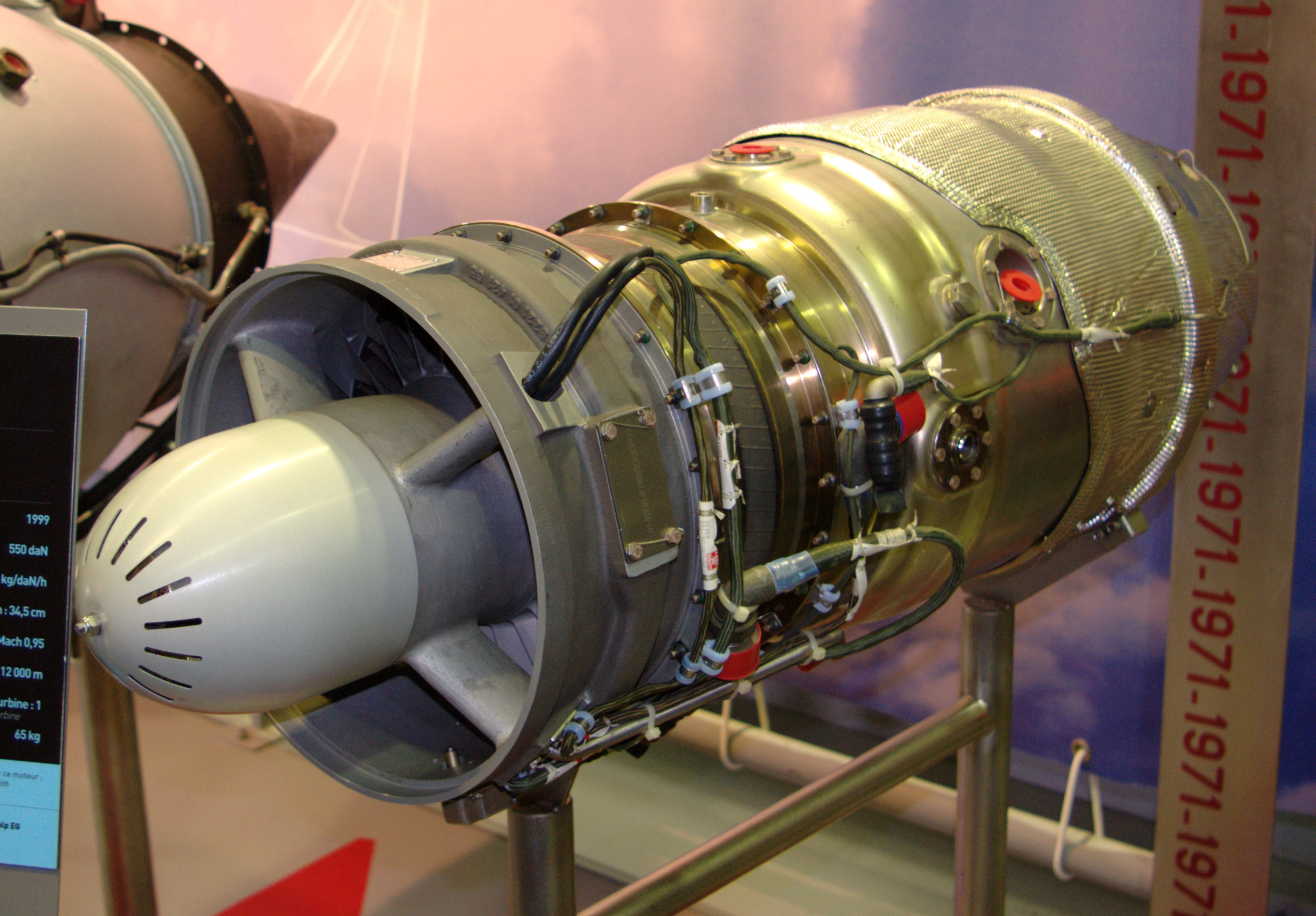
A Microturbo TRI 60-30 expendable turbojet engine used by the Storm Shadow, Musée aéronautique et spatial Safran

The missile weighs about 1,300 kilograms (2,900 lb), with a conventional warhead of 450 kilograms (990 lb). It has a maximum body diameter of 48 centimetres (19 in) and a wingspan of three metres (120 in). It is propelled at Mach 0.8 by a Microturbo TRI 60-30 turbojet engine and has a range of approximately 250 km (130 nmi; 160 mi).

The weapon can be launched from a number of different aircraft—the Saab Gripen, Dassault Mirage 2000, Dassault Rafale, the Panavia Tornado, both the Italian Tornado IDS and formerly the British Tornado GR4 (now retired), and a modified Sukhoi Su-24. Storm Shadow was integrated with the Eurofighter Typhoon as part of the Phase 2 Enhancement (P2E) in 2015, but will not be fitted to the F-35 Lightning II.

The Storm Shadow's BROACH warhead features an initial penetrating charge to clear soil or enter a bunker, then a variable delay fuze to control detonation of the main warhead. Intended targets are command, control and communications centres; airfields; ports and power stations; ammunition management and storage facilities; surface ships and submarines in port; bridges and other high value strategic targets.

The missile is fire and forget, programmed before launch. Once launched, it cannot be controlled or commanded to self-destroy and its target information cannot be changed. Mission planners programme the weapon with details of the target and its air defences. The missile follows a path semi-autonomously, on a low flight path guided by GPS and terrain mapping to the target area. Close to the target, the missile climbs to increase its field of view and improve penetration, matches the target stored image with its IR camera and then dives into the target.

Climbing to altitude is intended to achieve the best probability of target identification and penetration. During the final maneuver, the nose cone is jettisoned to allow a high resolution thermographic camera (infrared homing) to observe the target area. The missile then tries to locate its target based upon its targeting information (DSMAC). If it cannot, and there is a high risk of collateral damage, the missile is capable of flying to a crash point instead of risking inaccuracy.

Enhancements reported in 2005 included the capability to relay target information just before impact and usage of one-way (link back) data link to relay battle damage assessment information back to the host aircraft, under development under a French DGA contract. At the time, inflight re-targeting capability using a two-way data link was planned. In 2016, it was announced that Storm Shadow would be refurbished under the Selective Precision Effects At Range 4 (SPEAR 4) missile project, with the upgrade being completed in 2022.

Some reports suggest a reduced capability version complying with Missile Technology Control Regime (MTCR) restrictions was created for export, for example to the United Arab Emirates.

The missile relies on classified US-owned cartographic data, using Terrain Contour Matching or TERCOM, to guide the missile to the target. This gives the US government veto of any sales to foreign countries under ITAR. In 2018, the French government tried to bypass this by creating an "ITAR-free" version of the missile for sale to Egypt that didn't use TERCOM. The missiles would have relied solely on GPS and inertial navigation systems to get to the target, making the missile more vulnerable to electronic warfare. An issue in Ukraine, where Russia jams GPS signals, is that US approval and data is necessary for the missiles to operate to their peak performance.

== History ==
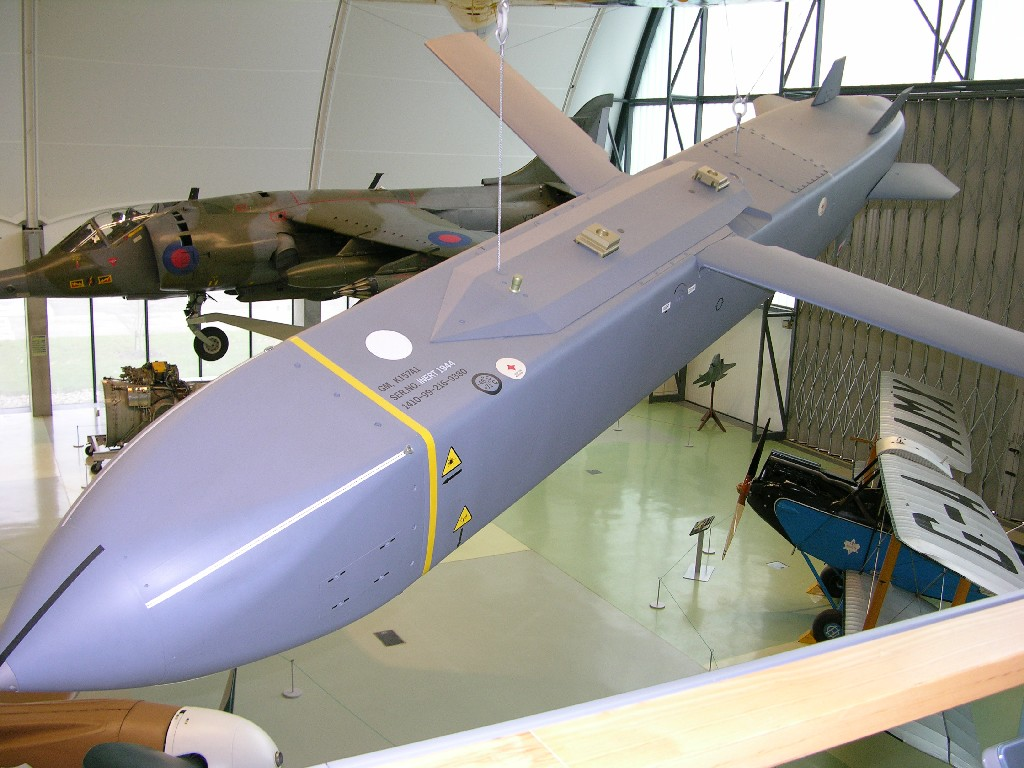
A Storm Shadow at the Royal Air Force Museum London

Matra and British Aerospace were selected as the prime contractors for the Conventionally Armed Standoff Missile (CASOM) in July 1996; their Storm Shadow missile beat submissions from McDonnell Douglas, Texas Instruments/Short Brothers, Hughes/Smiths Industries, Daimler-Benz Aerospace/Bofors, GEC-Marconi and Rafael. The Storm Shadow design was based on Matra's Apache anti-runway cruise missile. A development and production contract was signed in February 1997, by which time Matra and BAe had completed the merger of their missile businesses to form Matra BAe Dynamics. France ordered 500 SCALP missiles in January 1998.

The first successful fully guided firing of the Storm Shadow/SCALP EG took place at the CEL Biscarosse range in France at the end of December 2000 from a Mirage 2000N.

The first flight of Storm Shadow missiles on the Eurofighter Typhoon took place on 27 November 2013 at Decimomannu Air Base in Italy, and was performed by Alenia Aermacchi using instrumented production aircraft 2.

The SCALP EG and Storm Shadow are identical except for how they integrate with the aircraft.

In July 2016, the UK's MoD awarded a £28 million contract to support the Storm Shadow over the next five years.

=== Combat use by the UK and France ===
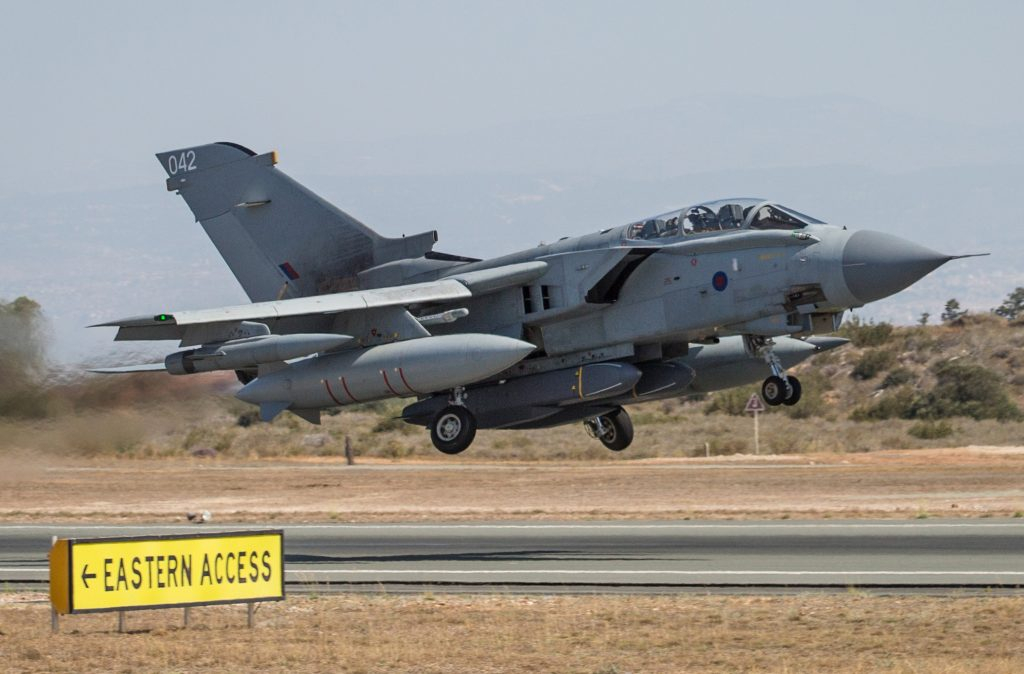
A RAF Tornado GR4 carrying two Storm Shadow missiles under its fuselage takes off at RAF Akrotiri in Cyprus on an Operation Shader mission, January 2019

RAF Tornados used Storm Shadow missiles operationally for the first time during the 2003 invasion of Iraq. Although they were yet to officially enter service, "an accelerated testing schedule" saw them employed by the RAF's 617 Squadron in the conflict.

During the 2011 military intervention in Libya, the Storm Shadow/SCALP-EG was fired at pro-Gaddafi targets by French Air Force Rafales and Italian Air Force and Royal Air Force Tornados. Targets included the Al Jufra Air Base, and a military bunker in Sirte, the home town of Libyan leader Muammar Gaddafi. In December 2011, Italian defence officials noted that Italian Tornado IDS aircraft had fired between 20 and 30 Storm Shadows during the Libyan Campaign. This was the first time that Italian aircraft had fired the missile in live combat, and it was reported the missile had a 97 per cent success rate.

French aircraft fired 12 SCALP missiles at ISIS targets in Syria as part of Operation Chammal. These launches took place on 15 December 2015 and 2 January 2016. It is thought that these firings may have been approved after a decision by the French MoD to reduce their inventory of SCALP missiles to reduce costs. On Sunday 26 June 2016 the RAF used four Storm Shadow missiles against an ISIS bunker in Iraq. The Storm Shadow missiles were launched from two Tornado aircraft. All four missiles scored direct hits, penetrating deep into the bunker. Storm Shadow missiles were used due to the bunker's massive construction.

In October 2016 the UK Government confirmed UK-supplied missiles were used by Saudi Arabia in the conflict in Yemen.

In April 2018 the UK Government announced they used Storm Shadow missiles deployed by Panavia Tornado GR4s to strike a chemical weapon facility in Syria. According to US Marine Corps Lt. Gen. Kenneth McKenzie, the Him Shinshar chemical weapons storage facility near Homs was hit by 9 US Tomahawks, 8 British Storm Shadows, 3 French MdCN cruise missiles, and 2 French SCALP cruise missiles. Satellite images showed that the site was destroyed in the attack. The Pentagon said that no missiles had been intercepted, and that the raids were "precise and overwhelming". In response, the Russian Ministry of Defence, during a press conference in Moscow, presented parts of what they claimed was a downed Storm Shadow missile.

On 11 March 2021, two Royal Air Force Typhoon FGR4 jets operating out of RAF Akrotiri, Cyprus hit a cave complex south west of the city of Erbil in northern Iraq, where a significant number of ISIS fighters were reported, marking the first combat use of the Storm Shadow from the Typhoon.

=== Ukraine ===
On 11 May 2023, the United Kingdom announced that it was supplying Storm Shadows to the Ukrainian military during the Russian invasion of Ukraine. This followed a pledge from the UK in February 2023 to send Ukraine long-range missiles in response to Russian strikes against Ukrainian infrastructure. Ukraine has insisted it would not use such weapons on Russian territory. UK Defence Minister Ben Wallace emphasised the delivery as a "calibrated, proportionate response to Russia's escalation", noting Russian use of even longer-range munitions including the Kh-47M2 hypersonic missile, 3M-54 Kalibr cruise missile, and Shahed-136 one-way attack drone.

The grant of Storm Shadow missiles is a significant boost to the Ukrainian military, as they are capable of striking targets at much longer ranges than had previously been possible, including command-and-control nodes and logistics points in occupied Crimea to interrupt Russia's ability to support the frontline. Shortly after, France announced it would be delivering the SCALP EG, its version of the missile, to Ukraine as well. France said it was not delivering weapons capable of hitting Russian soil. The UK on 18 May confirmed Ukraine had already successfully used the Storm Shadow. Although no information was publicly disclosed regarding when exactly the French missiles were delivered to Ukraine, Ukraine's ambassador to France, Vadym Omelchenko, confirmed in an interview with LB.ua on 22 August 2023 that all SCALP missiles promised by French president Emmanuel Macron had been delivered already, likely by the time of the latter's announcement in May. Omelchenko further stated that the first batch of missiles (reported by some outlets to number 50 units) had more than proven its worth and that supplies of SCALP batches by France would continue. Previously, on 6 August, a few days after the attack on the Chongar Strait railway bridge, the SCALP's operational status in Ukraine had visually been confirmed as were its use in the attack and its successful integration to Ukrainian Su-24 bombers.

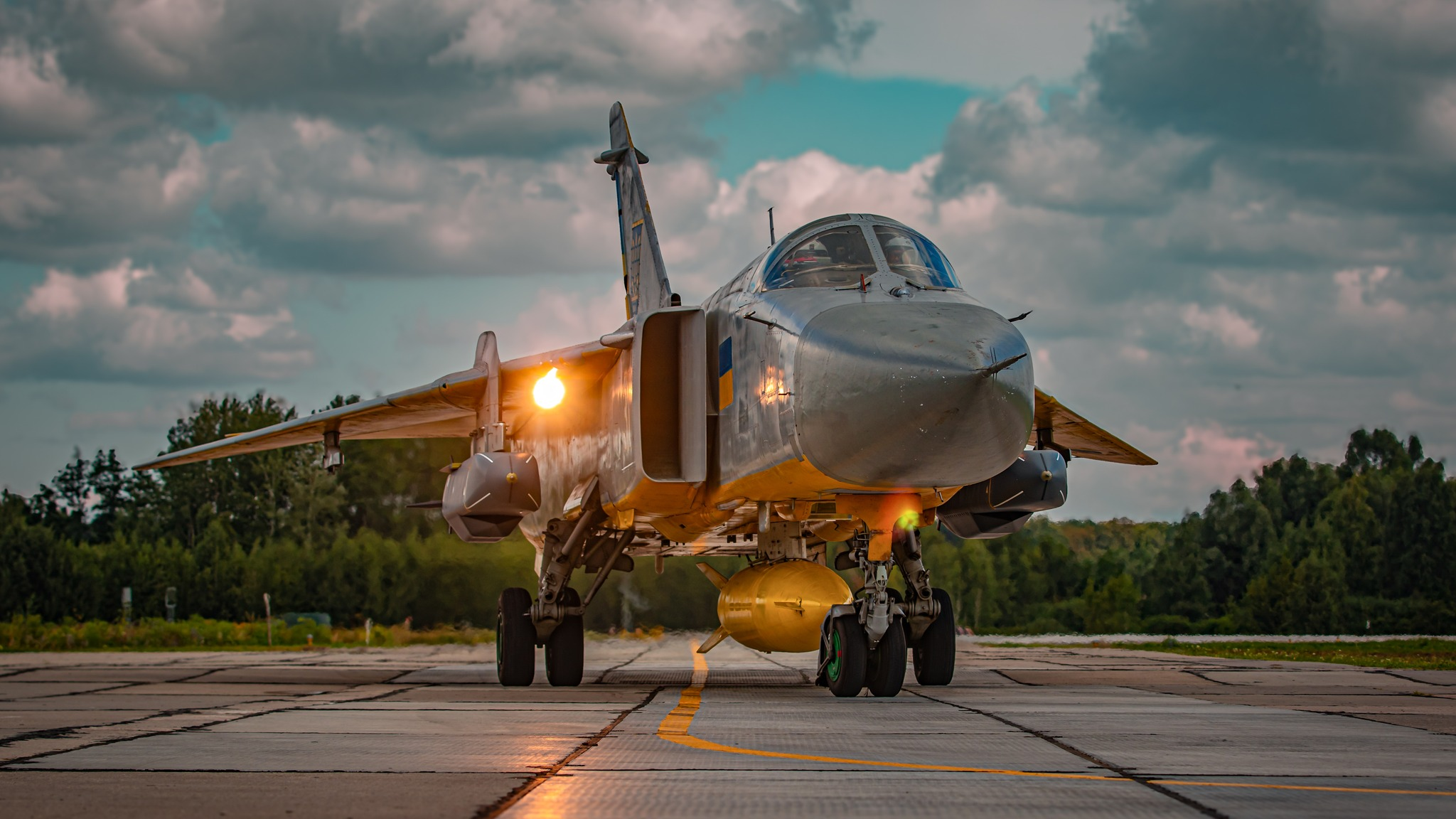
Ukrainian Air Force Sukhoi Su-24M carrying two Storm Shadow/SCALP-EG cruise missiles

Russia claimed Ukraine used Storm Shadow missiles to strike industrial sites in Luhansk on 13 May 2023, just two days after their delivery had been announced. According to a report by Russian news outlet Izvestia, the cruise missiles are launched from specially modified Su-24 strike aircraft and fly under the cover of MiG-29 and Su-27 fighters equipped with AGM-88 HARMs. Ukrainian command also uses UAVs and ADM-160 MALD decoys to divert Russian air defenses and protect the aircraft and ordnance from being intercepted. Ukraine's Minister of Defense Oleksii Reznikov confirmed the Su-24 as the Ukrainian Air Force's Storm Shadow launch platform, tweeting a photo of a Su-24MR with a missile on each of its inboard underwing pylons. The pylons use an adaptor derived from retired RAF Tornado GR4 aircraft.

Reznikov said at the end of May that the missiles had hit 100% of their targets, although Russia's Defence Ministry has claimed to have shot some down.

On 12 June, a strike which involved the Storm Shadow killed Major General Sergey Goryachev in Zaporizhzhia Oblast. At the time he was Chief of Staff of the 35th Combined Arms Army. On 22 June, the Chonhar road bridge connecting Crimea with Kherson Oblast was struck by a Storm Shadow missile to interrupt Russian logistics. A largely intact Storm Shadow crashed in Zaporizhzhia in early July. TASS claimed Russian forces had shot it down and recovered the wreckage to study the missile's design and help develop countermeasures to it.

On 9 July 2023, Storm Shadow/SCALP missile was shot down by Russian air defence and captured later.

On 29 July 2023, a Storm Shadow or SCALP missile hit the Chongar Strait railway bridge linking occupied Crimea with the Kherson Oblast, landing between the two tracks on the bridge approach.

On 13 September 2023, Storm Shadow and/or SCALP missiles were used in a strike against the Sevastopol port, seriously damaging the Rostov na Donu submarine and seriously damaging (according to some sources, beyond repair) the Ropucha-class landing ship Minsk.

On 22 September 2023, at least three Storm Shadow and/or SCALP missiles hit the Black Sea Fleet headquarters in Sevastopol. According to the Ukraine military, the missile attack targeted a meeting of the Russian Navy's leadership. "After the hit of the headquarters of the Russian Black Sea Fleet, 34 officers were killed, including the commander of the Russian Black Sea Fleet", they said. While no confirmation of Sokolov's alleged death is known, neither has any reliable source depicted him as alive and well since the attack took place. They also claimed that the strike wounded at least 100 other Russian service personnel.

On 26 December 2023 it is believed two Storm Shadow and/or SCALP missiles were launched against the Russian occupied port of Feodosia with the Russian landing ship Novocherkassk being hit and turned into a burning wreck.

At a news conference on 28 May 2024, French President Macron said he permitted Ukraine to use SCALP missiles to strike targets inside Russia, a major departure from previous guidelines that restricted the use of foreign-supplied weapons only to occupied territory. This expansion of use is still restricted to neutralisation of military facilities being used for attacks into Ukraine.

In July 2024, the British Prime Minister Keir Starmer announced that the British government would allow the defensive use of Storm Shadow missiles on targets inside Russia.

On 25 September 2024, Russian President Vladimir Putin warned the West that if attacked with conventional weapons Russia would consider a nuclear retaliation, in an apparent deviation from the no first use doctrine. Putin went on to threaten nuclear powers that if they supported another country's attack on Russia, then they would be considered participants in such an aggression. Experts say Putin's announcement is aimed at dissuading the United States, the United Kingdom and France from allowing Ukraine to use Western-supplied long-range missiles such as the ATACMS and Storm Shadow in strikes against Russia.

On 20 November 2024, Ukraine was reported to have fired British Storm Shadow missiles into Russia for the first time. The use of Storm Shadow missiles comes after Russia launched a counteroffensive in Kursk, which was invaded by Ukrainian troops in August. It also follows the Biden administration's decision to give Ukraine the green light to use US-made long-range missiles inside Russia earlier that week. Kyiv first used ATACMS to strike a military facility in Bryansk early on 19 November.

It was later reported that the 20 November strikes had hit an underground military facility in Maryino, Kursk Oblast, allegedly killing Russian general Lt-Gen Valery Solodchuk, some other Russian officers, and North Korean troops. Russian authorities did not confirm the losses and there has been no independent verification yet.

On 22 October 2025 Ukraine used the Storm Shadow to attack a Russian chemical-plant inside Russia. The missile was used again on December 25 to attack Russian oil and gas facilities. Ukraine’s General Staff said the air force used Storm Shadow missiles to strike the Novoshakhtinsk oil refinery in Russia’s Rostov region.

=== India ===
The Indian Air Force deployed Rafale jets armed with SCALP missiles and AASM Hammer bombs in an operation to strike 9 targets with precision during the 23 minute-long Operation Sindoor, early in the morning of 7 May 2025.

On 10 May 2025, the Indian Air Force struck 11 air bases across Pakistan using various weapons, including SCALP missiles. PAF Base Nur Khan and PAF Base Mushaf were hit; at Nur Khan, PAF’s next-generation mobile mission control centres were destroyed, while Mushaf's runway sustained major damage. One Pakistan Air Force personnel was also killed in these strikes.

== Export variant ==
=== Black Shaheen ===
Developed by France for export to the United Arab Emirates for use with its Mirage 2000, modifications were made to reduce the range reportedly to 290 km (160 nmi; 180 mi) in order to comply with Missile Technology Control Regime guidelines.

=== Ukrainian SCALP ===
Ukraine is seeking a production licence, from France, for SCALP missiles to be made in Ukraine, with “progress” being made according to Ukrainian Defence Minister Mykhailo Fedorov.

== Replacement ==
Between 2016 and 2018, France and the United Kingdom began jointly developing a replacement for Storm Shadow/SCALP for both the French Air and Space Force and the Royal Air Force, as well as the Exocet and Harpoon anti-ship missiles for the French Navy and Royal Navy. As of 2022, the programme was examining two complementary concepts; a subsonic, low observable missile and a supersonic, highly manoeuvrable missile. On 20 June 2023 at the Paris Air Show, Italy signed a letter of intent to join the programme. Italy confirmed its initial funding contribution in November and this also came with the announcement that the programme would produce a deep-strike land-attack missile by 2028 and an anti-ship missile by 2034.

== Operators ==
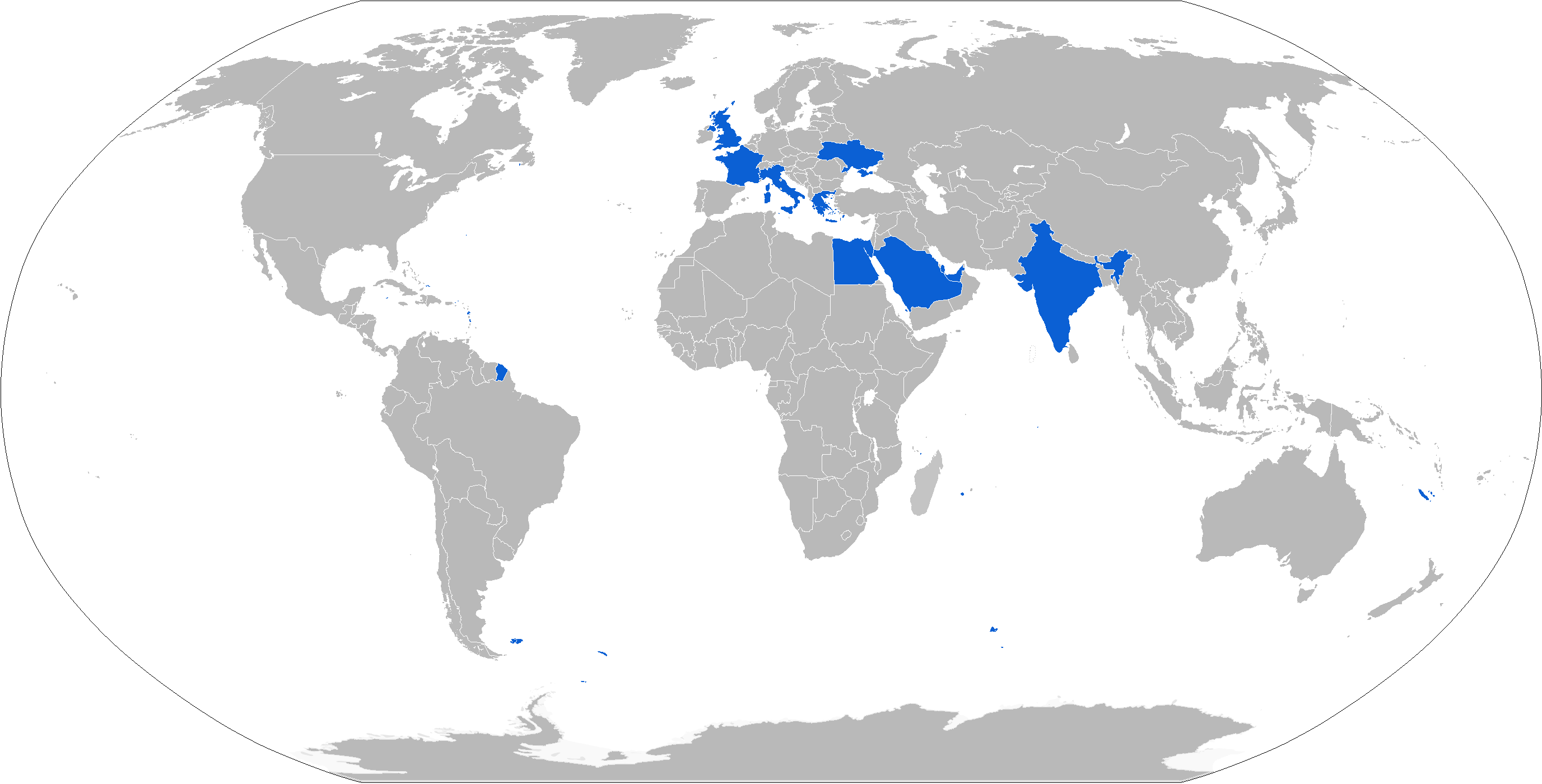
Operators of Storm Shadow in blue

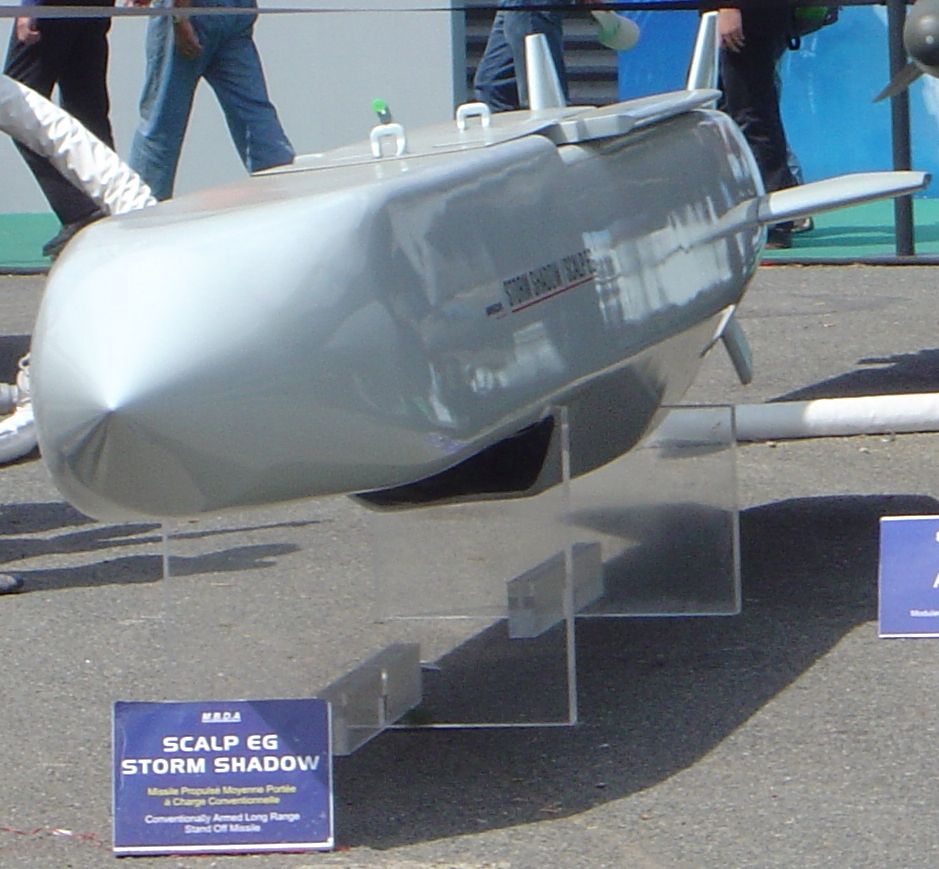
Storm Shadow/SCALP EG

Croatia
Undisclosed number of SCALP-EG missiles ordered as part of the Dassault Rafale deal was confirmed to Večernji list by head of Croatian Air Force Michael Križanec.
Egypt
100+ delivered for the Egyptian Air Force as part of the Dassault Rafale deal.
France
500 SCALP missiles ordered for the French Air and Space Force in 1998. 50 MdCNs ordered in 2006 and a further 150 ordered in 2009 for the French Navy.
Greece
90 ordered for the Hellenic Air Force in 2000 and 2003. More ordered and delivered in 2022 as part of the Dassault Rafale F3R deal.
Italy
200 ordered for the Aeronautica Militare in 1999.
India
Undisclosed number ordered for the Indian Air Force in 2016 as part of the Dassault Rafale deal. Additional order worth ₹3,200 crore (€300 million) expected as of February 2026.
Qatar
140 ordered for the Qatar Air Force in 2015.
Saudi Arabia
Undisclosed number ordered for the Royal Saudi Air Force.
Ukraine
Undisclosed number donated by France, Italy, and the UK. On 14 July 2026, France and Ukraine signed an agreement that would allow it to manufacture the SCALP cruise missile under licence.
United Arab Emirates
Undisclosed number ordered for the United Arab Emirates Air Force in 1997. Known as Black Shaheen.
United Kingdom
The Independent estimated the order for the Royal Air Force to be between 700 and 1,000.

== See also ==
- 3M14A – (Russia)
- AGM-129 ACM – (United States)
- AGM-158 JASSM – (United States)
- AKF-98 – (China)
- BrahMos-A – (India, Russia)
- Delilah – (Israel)
- HN-1 – (China)
- HOPE/HOSBO – (Germany)
- Joint Strike Missile – (Norway)
- KALCM Cheonryong – (South Korea)
- KD-88 – (China)
- Kh-55 – (Soviet Union)
- Kh-61/P-800 – (Russia)
- MTC-300 – (Brazil)
- Popeye – (Israel)
- Ra'ad-II – (Pakistan)
- Saber – (United Arab Emirates)
- SOM (missile) – (Turkey)
- Taurus KEPD 350 – (Sweden, Germany)
- Wan Chien – (Taiwan)
