= JPT2 =

Protein-coding gene in the species Homo sapiens

Identifiers
- Aliases: JPT2, C16orf34, L11, HN1L, hematological and neurological expressed 1-like, hematological and neurological expressed 1 like, Jupiter microtubule associated homolog 2
- External IDs: MGI: 1196260; HomoloGene: 16934; GeneCards: JPT2; OMA:JPT2 - orthologs

Gene location (Human)
Chr.	Chromosome 16 (human)
Band	16p13.3	Start	1,678,256 bp
Band	16p13.3	End	1,702,280 bp

Gene location (Mouse)
Chr.	Chromosome 17 (mouse)
Band	17 A3.3|17 12.53 cM	Start	25,156,393 bp
Band	17 A3.3|17 12.53 cM	End	25,179,663 bp
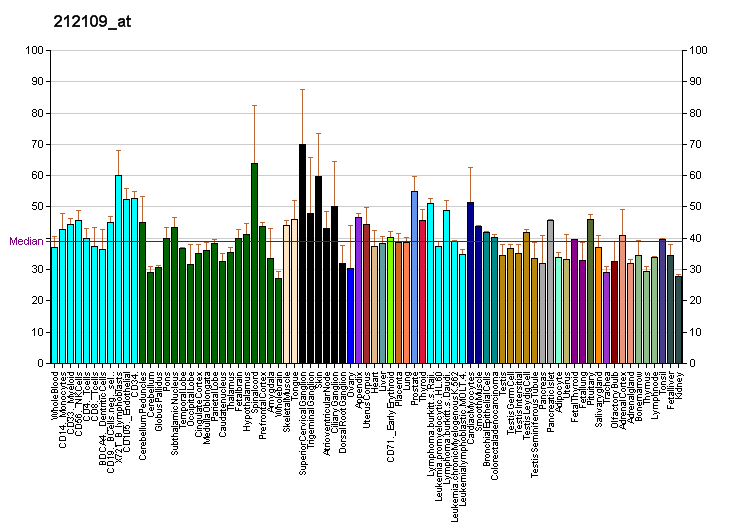

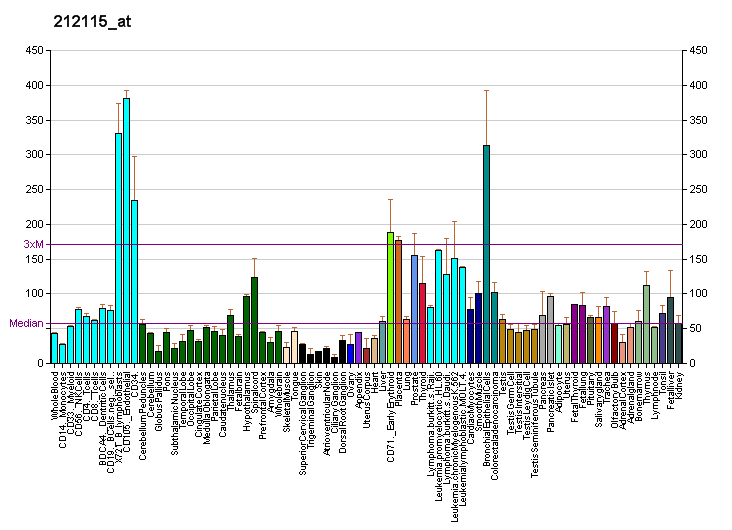

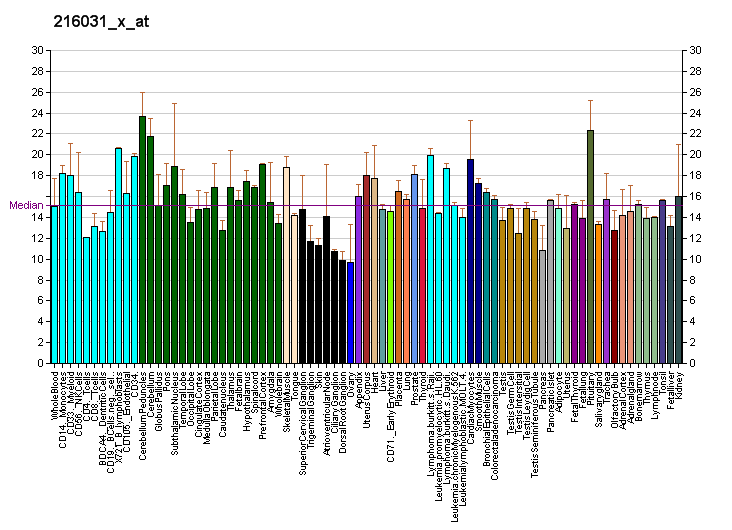
RNA expression pattern
Bgee	Human / Mouse (ortholog); Top expressed in: epithelium of bronchus; bronchial epithelial cell; C1 segment; sperm; pancreatic ductal cell; amniotic fluid; inferior ganglion of vagus nerve; epithelium of nasopharynx; dorsal motor nucleus of vagus nerve; inferior olivary nucleus / Top expressed in: hand; tail of embryo; abdominal wall; dermis; epiblast; yolk sac; genital tubercle; human fetus; primitive streak; zygote; More reference expression data
BioGPS	More reference expression data
Orthologs
Species	Human	Mouse
Entrez	90861	52009
Ensembl	ENSG00000206053	ENSMUSG00000024165
UniProt	Q9H910	Q6PGH2
RefSeq (mRNA)	NM_144570	NM_198937
RefSeq (protein)	NP_653171	NP_945175
Location (UCSC)	Chr 16: 1.68 – 1.7 Mb	Chr 17: 25.16 – 25.18 Mb
PubMed search
- Wikidata
View/Edit Human	View/Edit Mouse

Jupiter microtubule associated homolog 2 is a protein that in humans is encoded by the JPT2 gene.

== Nomenclature ==
Jupiter is a Drosophila gene.

== See also ==
- Homolog
- JPT1
- Microtubule
