= Aarne Kreuzinger-Janik =

German lieutenant general

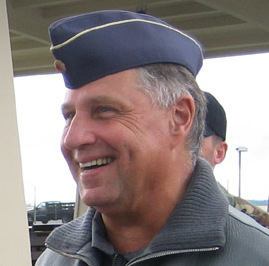
- Kreuzinger-Janik in 2007
- Born: 13 April 1950 (age 76); Lübeck, West Germany
- Children: 2
- Military career
- Allegiance: Germany
- Branch: Air Force Forces Command
- Rank: Lieutenant general
- Commands: Air Force Forces Command

Aarne Emil Kreuzinger-Janik (born 13 April 1950) is a German lieutenant general of the Bundeswehr. He was the commander of the Air Force Forces Command from 2006 to 2009, and, from 2009 to 2012, the 14th Inspector of the Air Force.

== Military career ==
Kreuzinger-Janik entered the Bundeswehr in 1969 and passed through the officer training and flight training as an aviation instructor for jet aircraft. From 1974 to 1981, he was a pilot of a Lockheed F-104 Starfighter, and a news officer and deployment officer at the Taktisches Luftwaffengeschwader 31 "Boelcke" in Nörvenich. After participating in the training as a general staff officer at the Führungsakademie der Bundeswehr in Hamburg from 1981 to 1983, he was there as a planning staff officer until 1985.

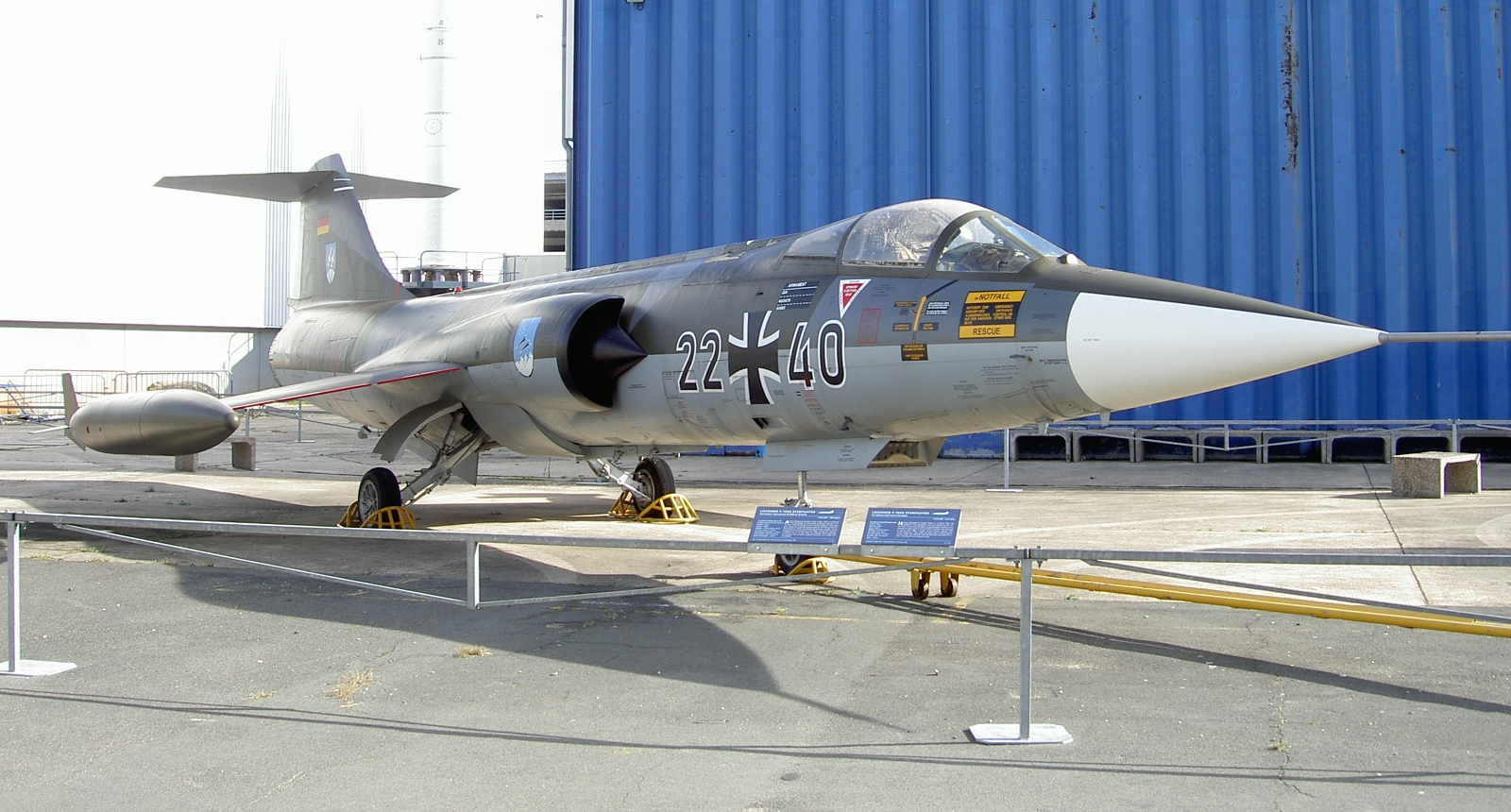
F-104 JaboG 34

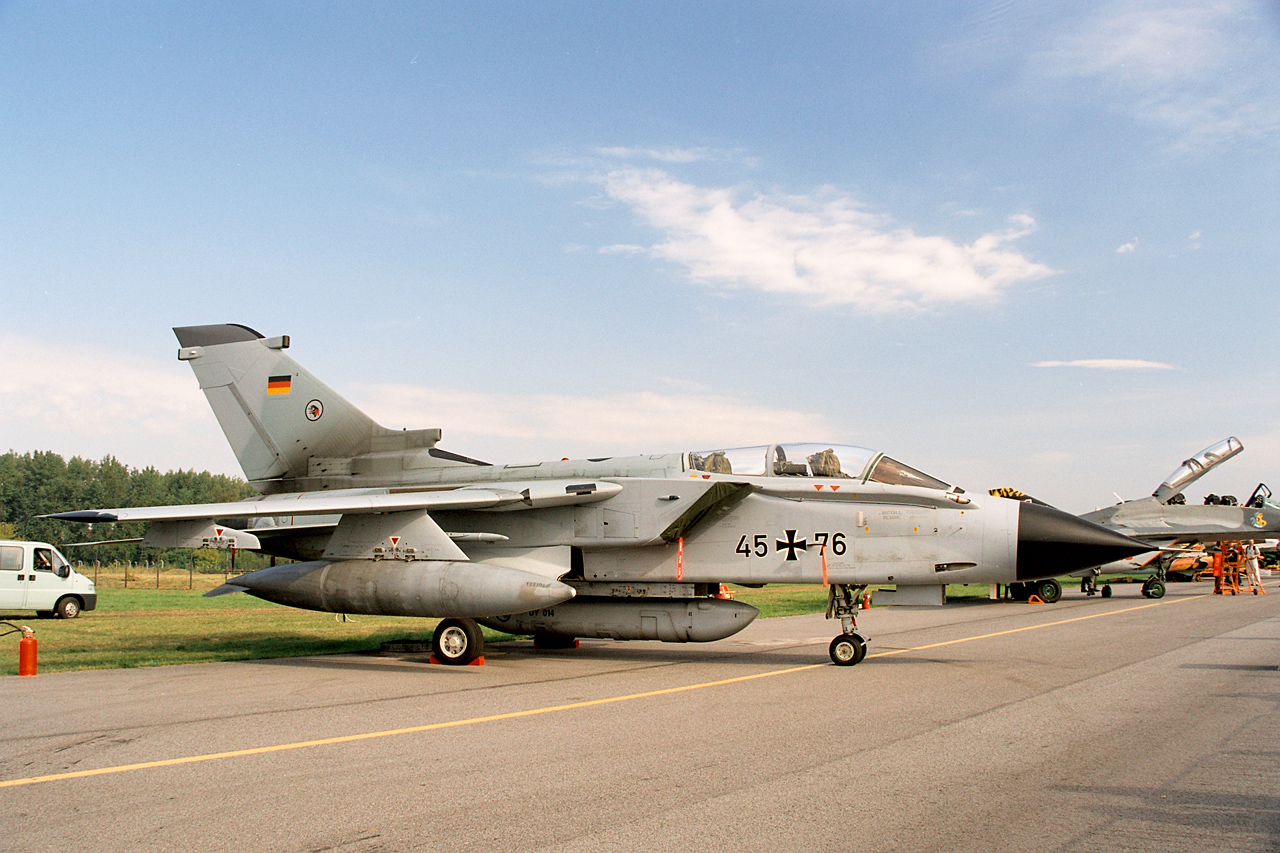
Tornado AG 51

In 1985, Kreuzinger-Janik was transferred to Memmingen as the relay captain of the "Allgäu" unit of the Jagdbombergeschwader 34 squadron. In 1988, he served as deputy director in the A3 department of the 3rd Luftwaffe Division at Kalkar, and in 1989 as a study project officer at the Bundeswehr Office for Studies at Bergisch Gladbach. In 1990, he returned to Jagdbombergeschwader 34 as the commander. In 1992, he became a G3 staff officer at the NATO headquarters at SHAPE in Mons, Belgium.

His first ministerial use followed, from 1994 to 1996, on a referendum service for military policy bases in the Armed Forces Staff (Fü S) at the Federal Ministry of Defense in Bonn. During his time as a geschwaderkommodore of the Taktisches Luftwaffengeschwader 51 "Immelmann" in Jagel, and from 1996 to 1997, he was a commodore of the Einsatzgeschwaders 1 of the Bundeswehr contingency in Piacenza in Italy. After his term as Deputy Commander and General for National Territorial Duties in the Military Area II from 1999 to 2000, he returned to a service post in the Luftwaffe.

From 2000 to 2003, he was Chief of Staff in the Luftwaffe's leadership (Fü L III) in Bonn. In 2003, he took command of the 3rd Luftwaffe Division, headquartered in Gatow. On 1 June 2006, Kreuzinger-Janik became commander of the Air Force Forces Command in Cologne and the Luftwaffenkaserne Wahn, which he held until 26 October.

=== Inspector General of Air Force ===
On 29 October 2009 defence minister Karl-Theodor zu Guttenberg (CSU) appointed Kreuzinger-Janik to the Inspector-General of the Air Force. He was followed, as already in 2003, as a division commander by general lieutenant Klaus-Peter Stieglitz. In this role, he worked until his retirement. He handed over his services as inspector to his successor, general lieutenant Karl Müllner. Kreuzinger-Janik retired on 30 April 2012.

Kreuzinger-Janik has over 2,800 flight hours, especially on the F-104 and the Panavia Tornado.

== Private life ==
Kreuzinger-Janik is married and has two children.

== Honors ==
- 2012: Order of Merit of the Federal Republic of Germany

== See also ==
- Rank insignia of the German Bundeswehr

Military offices
| Preceded by Generalleutnant Walter Jertz | Commander of Air Force Forces Command; 1 June 2006 – 26 October 2009 | Succeeded by Generalleutnant Peter Schelzig |
