= Karl Müllner =

German air force general

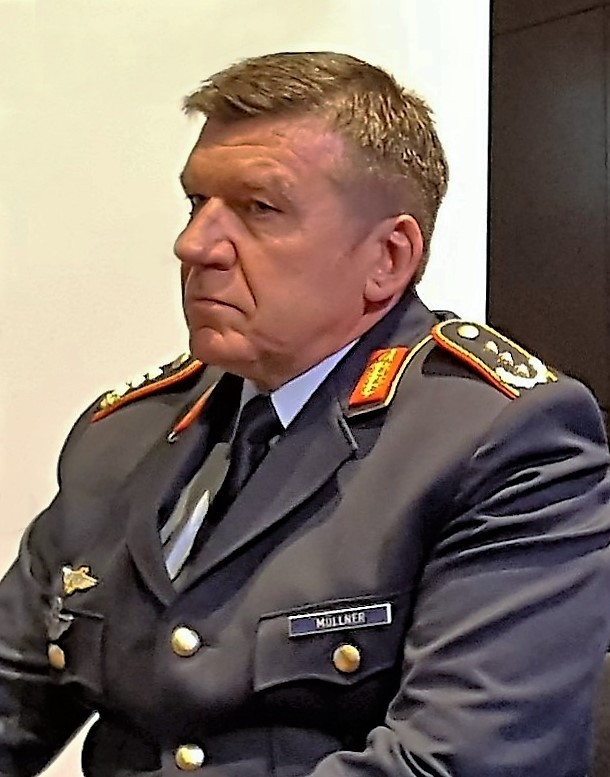
Karl Müllner

Karl Müllner (born 18 February 1956) is a former German air force general. He served as Inspector of the Air Force from 25 April 2012 to 29 May 2018.

Ingo Gerhartz was his successor.

== Carrer ==
Following his pilot training at the United States Air Force, he began flying the F-4F "Phantom II" in 1983, serving as a fighter pilot as well as a flight and weapons instructor. In 1990, he became a squadron commander in Fighter Wing 74 "Mölders," based in Neuburg an der Donau. He gained his initial ministerial experience at the Federal Ministry of Defence (BMVg) as a desk officer for the fundamentals of military policy and bilateral relations in 1998 and 2003. In 2007 he became head at the division level in becomming Commander of the 2nd Air Force Division in Birkenfeld.

=== Inspector of the Air Force ===
On April 25, 2012, he succeeded Klaus-Peter Stieglitz as Commander of the German Air Force. He held this position until his retirement in May 2018 longer than any other Inspector of the Air Force before him.

Military offices
Preceded by Aarne Kreuzinger-Janik	Inspector of the Air Force; 2012–2018	Succeeded by Ingo Gerhartz
