= TERPROM =

Military navigation Ground Proximity Warning System

TERPROM (terrain profile matching) is a military navigation Ground Proximity Warning System (GPWS) employed on aircraft and missiles, which uses stored digital elevation data combined with navigation system and radar altimeter inputs to compute the location of an aircraft or missile above the surface of the Earth. It is also used as a warning system to prevent aircraft from flying too close to the ground. The acronym TERPROM has become a trademark in its own right.

TERPROM was initially conceived in 1977 within the Bristol-based Guided Weapons New Projects Office of British Aerospace as a private venture project. The private venture status continued until the mid-1980s. British Aerospace later received a MoD funded contract to advise the Government on the development options and applications of tactical cruise missiles.

TERPROM utilises Terrain Referenced Navigation to provide aircraft with a Predictive Ground Collision Avoidance System (PGCAS) as well as Obstruction Warning and Cueing (OWC).

TERPROM is produced by Atlantic Inertial Systems, Plymouth, UK, formerly a subsidiary of BAE Systems, acquired in December 2009 by Goodrich Corporation, itself bought by United Technologies Corporation in 2012 branded as Collins Aerospace. As of 2020, the company merged with Raytheon to become Raytheon Technologies (RTX).

TERPROM has been fitted, and used operationally, on the following platforms:

- F-16, Mirage 2000, Harrier, SEPECAT Jaguar, Panavia Tornado, A-10, Eurofighter Typhoon, BAE Hawk, C-130 and C-17 aircraft
- Storm Shadow cruise missile, although Storm Shadow uses a different form of Terrain Profile Matching navigation and terrain avoidance system, developed by MBDA from the flight-proven TERPROM design and development by British Aerospace at Bristol.

Customised versions are available for fixed wing fast jet, fixed wing transport, rotary wing and missile platforms.
