= Ingo Gerhartz =

German Air Force general (b. 1965)

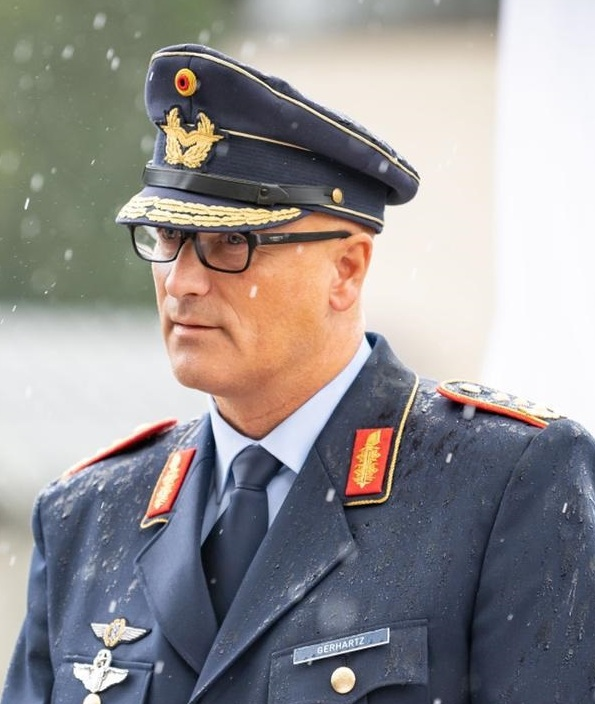
- Gerhartz in 2020
- Born: 9 December 1965 (age 60); Cochem, Rhineland-Palatinate, West Germany
- Education: Embry–Riddle Aeronautical University (MS)
- Children: 2
- Military career
- Allegiance: West Germany (to 1990); Germany
- Branch: German Air Force
- Service years: 1985–present
- Rank: General
- Commands: Allied Joint Force Command Brunssum; Inspector of the Air Force; Fighter-Bomber Wing 31
- Conflicts: War in Afghanistan

Ingo Gerhartz (born December 9, 1965, in Cochem) is a German general who has served as the commander of Allied Joint Force Command Brunssum since 2025. He previously served as the Inspector of the German Air Force from 2018 to 2025.

== Military career ==
Gerhartz joined the German Air Force on 1 July 1985 as a conscript. From 1986 to 1987 he attended officer training at Fürstenfeldbruck Air Base.

He was then selected for flying training, attending Euro-NATO Joint Jet Pilot Training at Sheppard Air Force Base, Texas from 1988 to 1989, where he flew the Cessna T-37 Tweet and Northrop T-38 Talon trainer aircraft. From 1989 to 1990, he then attended weapon systems training for the F-4 Phantom II at George Air Force Base, California.

From 1990 to 1998, Gerhartz served as part of Fighter Wing 71 (Jagdgeschwader 71), operating the F-4F Phantom II, and stationed at Wittmundhafen Air Base. There he also served as the wing's operations officer.

From 2000 to 2003, Gerhartz commanded the flying group of Fighter Wing 73 (Jagdgeschwader 73), operating the MiG-29 Fulcrum at Laage Air Base.

From 2008 to 2010, Gerhartz commanded Fighter-Bomber Wing 31 (Jagdbombergeschwader 31), operating the Panavia Tornado IDS and Eurofighter Typhoon. During this time, he deployed to Camp Marmal, Afghanistan, as part of NATO's International Security Assistance Force (ISAF) mission.

From 2010 to 2018, Gerhartz held various staff positions in Air Force Forces Command (Luftwaffenführungskommando), Air Force Command (Kommando Luftwaffe), and in the Federal Ministry of Defence.

=== Inspector of the Air Force ===
Flag of the Inspector of the Air Force, the Commander of the German Air and Space Force

Starting 29 May 2018, and ending 27 May 2025 Gerhartz served as the Inspector of the Air Force (Inspekteur der Luftwaffe), the commander of the German Air Force.

He worked in intensifying the work with Israel. In 2020 for the first time the Israeli Air Force took part in "Blue Wings“ above German territory. On 18 August 2020 Israeli and German planes flew in joint formation above the concentration camp memorial place in Dachau and above Fürstenfeldbruck, the latter being the site of the 1972 Olympia attack. MAGDAYs a joint exercise with Hungary and Israel is another example for the cooperation.

During the Blue Flag exercise at Ovda Air Base, Israel in October 2021 Gerhartz jointly with Israeli Air Force commander General Amikam Norkin, celebrates a symbolic act: Norkin as co-pilot of an F-15 Eagle of the Israeli Air Force and Gerhartz as pilot of a Eurofighter of the Luftwaffengeschwader Boelcke flew side by side of the government area and the Knesset in Jerusalem. The Times of Israel noted, that this was the first flight of a German fighter over Jerusalem since World War One. A few days later Gerhartz received from the chief of staff GenLt. Aviv Kohavi, the Chief of Staff Medal of Appreciation for his special special merits with respect to the IDF and the security of Israel.

During the war of Israel against Hamas he visited Israel as a sign for solidarity with Israel. On 6. November 2023 he met with the chief of the Israeli Air Force General Tomer Bar, had a short meeting with the defence minister Yoav Galant and also met the German ambassador in Israel Steffen Seibert. On 7 November 2023 he donated blood at the Sheba Medical Center.

During his time as an active fighter pilot, he logged a total of over 3,000 flight hours on four aircraft types: F-4F, MIG-29, Tornado and Eurofighter. As Air Wing Commander during the NATO Mission to Afghanistan, General Gerhartz flew more than 50 Combat Sorties on the Tornado aircraft.

=== Commander of the Allied Joint Force Command Brunssum ===
On 11 June 2025, the official change of command ceremony took place at the headquarters of Allied Joint Force Command Brunssum, with General Guglielmo Luigi Miglietta of the Italian Army handing over command to General Ingo Gerhartz of the German Air Force (Luftwaffe).

=== Taurus leak ===
In 2024, Gerhartz was one of the participants in an insufficiently secured web conference on the potential provision of Taurus missiles to Ukraine and the presence of US and UK military personnel in that theatre or war, which was intercepted and leaked by Russia.

Defense Minister Boris Pistorius (SPD) pushed back against the political pressure on his staff, stating at a press conference: "I will not sacrifice any of my best officers to Putin’s games."

== Personal life ==
Gerhartz is married to a teacher, they have two children.

Military offices
Preceded by Karl Müllner	Inspector of the Air Force; 2018–2025	Succeeded by Holger Neumann
