= China Chang Feng =

Chinese aerospace academy

China Changfeng Mechanics and Electronics Technology Academy (Chinese: 中国长峰机电技术研究设计院; pinyin: Zhōngguó zhǎng fēng jīdiàn jìshù yánjiū shèjì yuàn) or China Changfeng, founded in 1957, is one of the four design academies under the China Aerospace Science and Technology Corporation (CASC). It is located on Yongding Road, in the western suburbs of Beijing, and employs more than 16,000 personnel.

Changfeng conducts research, development and production of air and missile defense, ASAT, and associated radar systems. It is also responsible for several SAM systems, including the HQ-2, HQ-7, and HQ-61. Changfeng developed the 8610 SRBM based on the HQ-2 SAM, previously developed by the academy. In recent years, Changfeng has expanded its focus to include submarine-launched and land-based ballistic missiles, such as the JL-1, DF-1 and DF-21.

== Other names ==
Other names for Changfeng are : Second Academy, Surface-to-Air Missile (SAM) Academy, China Changfeng Group (CCFG), China Changfeng Company (CCC), China Changfeng (CCF), China Chang Feng Mechano-Electronic Engineering Company.

== Sources ==
- NTI, China Changfeng Mechanics and Electronics Technology Academy
