= Hongniao =

Hongniao (HN)
- Type: Land attack cruise missiles
- Place of origin: China

Service history
- In service: late 1999 to present
- Used by: China

Production history
- Manufacturer: New New Electrical Factory (新新电机厂) in Shanghai
- Produced: late 1990s

Specifications
- Mass: 1.6 – 2.5 ton
- Warhead: conventional or nuclear warheads
- Detonation mechanism: Proximity / semi-armor-piercing
- Engine: turbofan
- Propellant: liquid fuel
- Operational range: 600 to 3,000+ km
- Flight altitude: 40 to 100 meter above sea and ground
- Maximum speed: ≈ Mach 0.7 – 0.9
- Guidance system: TERCOM / Inertial guidance/ TV / Imaging infrared homing
- Launch platform: Xian H-6, Xian JH-7, ships, submarines, & ground launchers

The HN (reported short for Hong Niao, or Hongniao, 红鸟 meaning Red Bird) missiles are a series of turbofan powered Chinese land attack cruise missiles, based on the X-600.

== Development ==
Although China was satisfied with the performance of its own Changfeng series land attack cruise missile, an inherent problem with this turbojet powered Changfeng (missile) meant that the size and weight of the missile were too large to be carried by aerial platforms in Chinese inventory and the range of the missile was inadequate. A turbofan powered version was needed, but due to the limitation of Chinese R&D and industrial capability of the time, this could not be achieved immediately. As a result, China decided to take a two-step approach, first to have the turbojet powered Changfeng missile meet the immediate need, then complete development on a turbofan powered version like the Tomahawk (missile family) for deployment on aerial platforms while China was building up its industrial infrastructure.

The breakup of the former Soviet Union provided a great boost for Chinese efforts in developing its own turbofan powered cruise missiles. According to US intelligence, by the end of 1992, China had successfully recruited more than fifteen hundred former Soviet missile scientists to work in China, and around twenty percent, roughly totaling around three hundred, were assigned to work in Shanghai to specifically aid the Chinese cruise missile development project. Although many Chinese sources agreed with US intelligence assessments, they disagree on the contributions of Russian/Soviet scientists. Instead of helping China to develop a specific missile type, Russian/Soviet expertise was first utilized on a much broader strategic scale in helping China to build the necessary industrial infrastructure needed to indigenously develop its own missiles in the future. These Chinese claims have been corroborated by the fact that despite a complete Kh-55 production facility being transferred to China in 1995 and the Russian public announcement of helping China in developing cruise missiles at the 1996 Paris Airshow, the first Chinese turbofan powered land attack cruise missile did not enter service until somewhere between the late 1990s and early 2000s, well after turbojet powered CF series land attack cruise missiles had already entered Chinese service.

In addition to the transfer of a complete Kh-55 production facility from Russia to China around 1995, China received another great boost in its land attack cruise missile development between 1999 and 2001 when half-a-dozen Kh-55 missiles were delivered to China from Ukraine (a dozen were transferred to Iran from Ukraine at the same time). These missiles were supposedly to be destroyed under the US-funded disarmament program but have provided valuable experience for China in its effort in developing its own versions, including both the HN series and DH-10. HN series land cruise attack missiles are developed by the New Electrical Factory (新新电机厂) in Shanghai, one of the three Chinese land attack cruise missile developers (the other two being China Sanjiang Space Group (三江航天集团), the developer of the Changfeng (missile), and the 3rd Design Academy of Aerospace Ministry in Beijing, later reorganized as CHEMTA, short for China Sea Eagle Electromechanical Technology Academy, 中国海鹰机电技术研究院).

== HN-1 ==
The HN-1 is reportedly a Chinese development of the native X-600 missile. Some sources believe it was based on the Kh-SD. The biggest difference between the HN-1 and its rumored origin Kh-SD missile is that a turbofan engine was adapted for HN-1, replacing the turbojet engine of Kh-SD. In 1988, China built an improved missile based on the X-600, called the HN-1. The top priority of HN-1 development was to have a land attack cruise missile compact enough to be carried by the Xian H-6, which was successfully achieved, but the claims of the HN-1 being able to be carried by the Xian JH-7 has yet to be verified. It is reported that HN-1 missiles consist of two versions, the ground-launched HN-1A and air-launched HN-1B. A test flight of the HN-1 was successfully completed in June 1999, and the missile is believed to have entered Chinese service in the same year.

== HN-2 ==
The HN-2 is reportedly the development of the Chinese HN-1. It incorporates an improved turbofan engine. It was tested in 1995. It carries a 20-90 kiloton warhead and a 400 kg warhead. Another improvement of HN-2 is that a high altitude approach mode is added. The maximum range is about 1,800 km. The HN-2 reportedly entered Chinese service in 2001.

== HN-3 ==
The HN-3 is an enlarged version of the Chinese HN-2, and many Chinese sources have claimed that by this time, Chinese capability had matured enough to develop this project on its own. The HN-3 actually increased in size and weight in comparison to earlier HN-1 and HN-2 missiles, and some sources have claimed that it is even larger than the Kh-65. The range of HN-3 is subject to debate and claims vary on the range from greater than a thousand kilometers to nearly three thousand kilometers. However, the DH-10, another Chinese land attack cruise missile with range between two thousand to three thousand kilometers is based on the Kh-55. An estimated range of the HN-3 of between one thousand and two thousand kilometers is more probable. The range of the HN-3 is somewhere between 1,200 and 3,000 km. The HN-3 reportedly entered Chinese service in 2002, and a ground-launched version has also been reportedly developed.

== HN-2000 ==
A stealthy, supersonic cruise/anti-ship missile has been reported under development. It is reported to be equipped with a millimeter wave active radar homing, infrared imaging mapping, synthetic aperture radar (SAR), and Beidou satellite guidance. It has an CEP (accuracy) of as little as 1–3 meters and a range of 4000 km. However such a weapon is still said to be under development, with little information on them currently available.

== User ==
- China: People's Liberation Army Ground Force

== Gallery ==
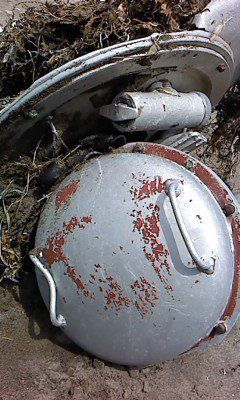
HN-3

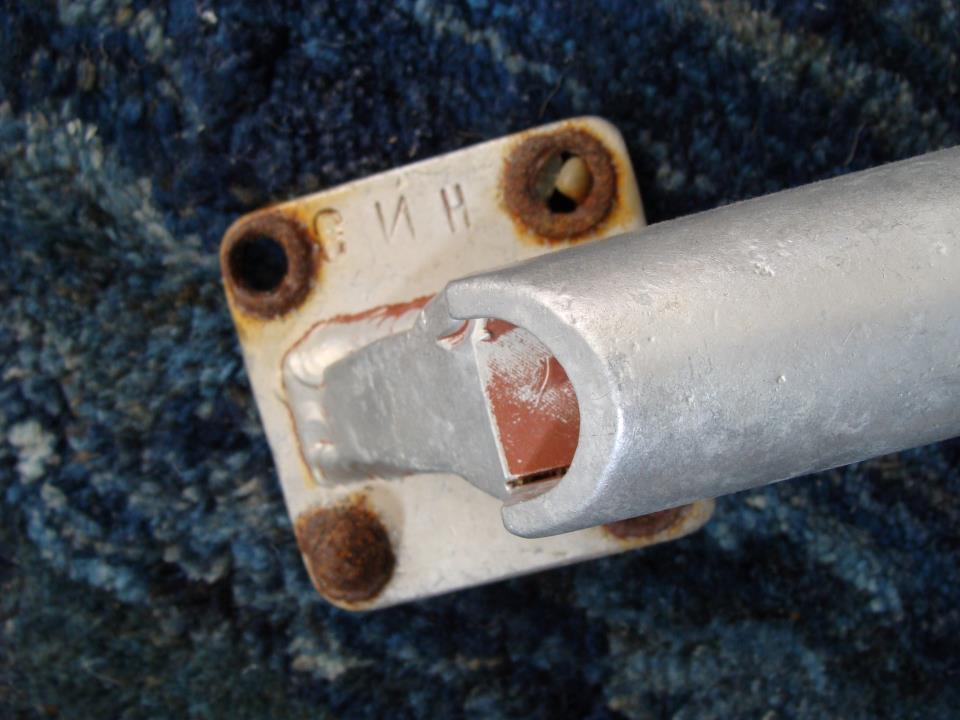
HN-3

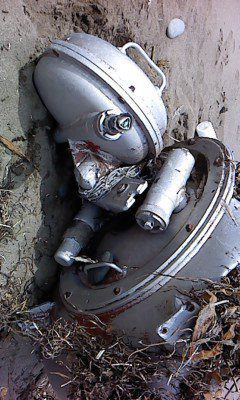
HN-3

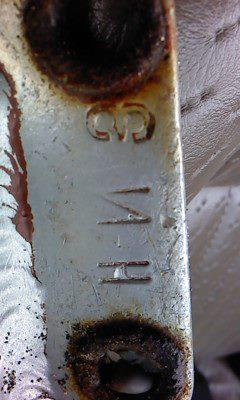
HN-3

== See also ==
- BGM-109 Tomahawk – (United States)
- 3M-54 Kalibr – (Russia)
- RK-55 – (Soviet Union)
- Hyunmoo-3 – (South Korea)
- Yun Feng – (Taiwan)
- AV-TM 300 – (Brazil)
- Nirbhay – (India)

== Bibliography ==
- CSIS Missile Threat - Hong Niao Series
- Changfeng & Hongniao missiles
- CF & HN missiles
