= JPT1 =

Protein-coding gene in the species Homo sapiens

Identifiers
- Aliases: JPT1, ARM2, HN1A, HN1, hematological and neurological expressed 1, Jupiter microtubule associated homolog 1
- External IDs: MGI: 1096361; HomoloGene: 7364; GeneCards: JPT1; OMA:JPT1 - orthologs

Gene location (Human)
Chr.	Chromosome 17 (human)
Band	17q25.1	Start	75,135,248 bp
Band	17q25.1	End	75,168,281 bp

Gene location (Mouse)
Chr.	Chromosome 11 (mouse)
Band	11 E2|11 80.84 cM	Start	115,388,179 bp
Band	11 E2|11 80.84 cM	End	115,405,213 bp
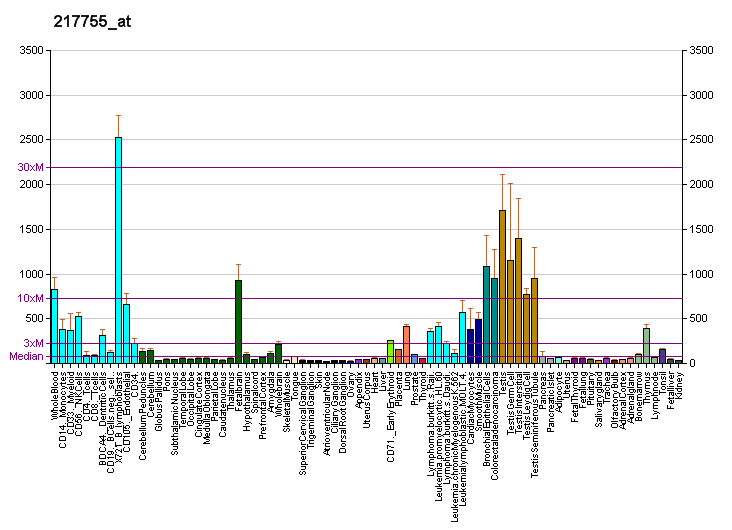
RNA expression pattern
Bgee	Human / Mouse (ortholog); Top expressed in: left testis; ganglionic eminence; right testis; ventricular zone; mucosa of transverse colon; blood; cerebellar hemisphere; granulocyte; gonad; rectum / Top expressed in: barrel cortex; Rostral migratory stream; medial ganglionic eminence; internal carotid artery; external carotid artery; fossa; condyle; superior cervical ganglion; neural tube; maxillary prominence; More reference expression data
BioGPS	More reference expression data
Orthologs
Species	Human	Mouse
Entrez	51155	15374
Ensembl	ENSG00000189159	ENSMUSG00000020737
UniProt	Q9UK76	P97825
RefSeq (mRNA)	NM_001002032; NM_001002033; NM_001288609; NM_001288610; NM_001288611 NM_016185	NM_008258
RefSeq (protein)	NP_001002032; NP_001002033; NP_001275538; NP_001275539; NP_001275540 NP_057269	NP_032284
Location (UCSC)	Chr 17: 75.14 – 75.17 Mb	Chr 11: 115.39 – 115.41 Mb
PubMed search
- Wikidata
View/Edit Human	View/Edit Mouse

Jupiter microtubule associated homolog 1 is a protein that in humans is encoded by the JPT1 gene.

== Nomenclature ==
Jupiter is a Drosophila gene.

NOTE: HN1 can also refer to the Notch 1 gene.

== See also ==
- Homolog
- JPT2
- Microtubule
