= Apache (missile) =

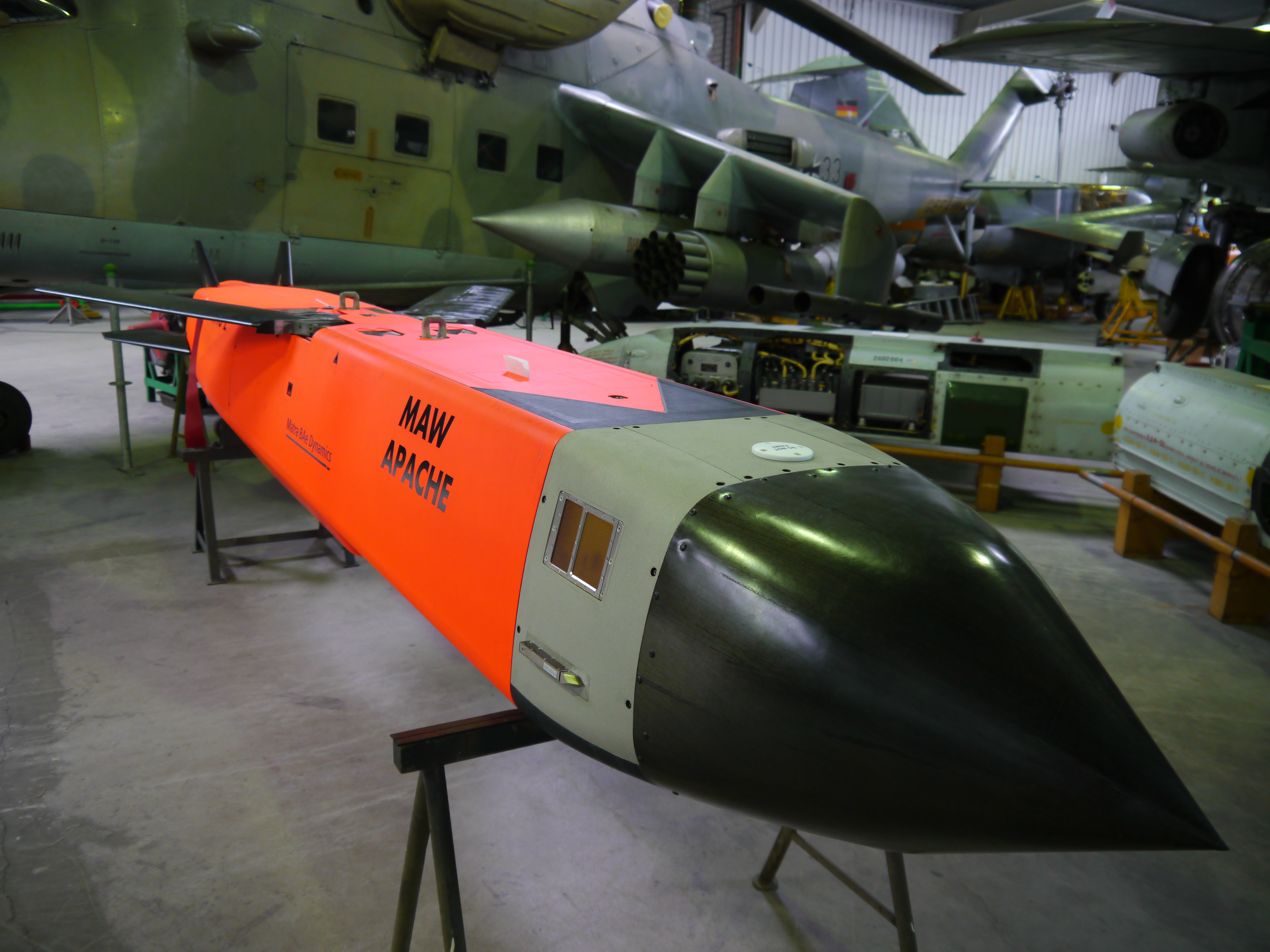
- Type: Anti-runway cruise missile
- Place of origin: France

Production history
- Manufacturer: MBDA France

Specifications
- Wingspan: 2.85 m
- Warhead: 10 Kriss anti-runway submunitions (50 kg warhead each)
- Engine: Turbojet
- Maximum speed: 1000 km/h
- Guidance system: GPS-INS
- Launch platform: Mirage 2000, Rafale

The Arme Propulsée À Charges Éjectables or Apache (/əˈpætʃi/ ə-PATCH-ee, French: [apaʃ]) is a French-developed, air-launched, anti-runway cruise missile manufactured by MBDA France. The SCALP EG missile is based on it, notably featuring similar aerodynamics and stealth. However, the latter has a different propulsion system and carries a single high-penetration warhead instead of the Apache's cluster submunitions.

== See also ==
- SCALP EG – (France, United Kingdom)
- Matra Durandal – (France)
