= Cruise missile =

Guided missile with precision targeting capabilities and multiple launch platforms

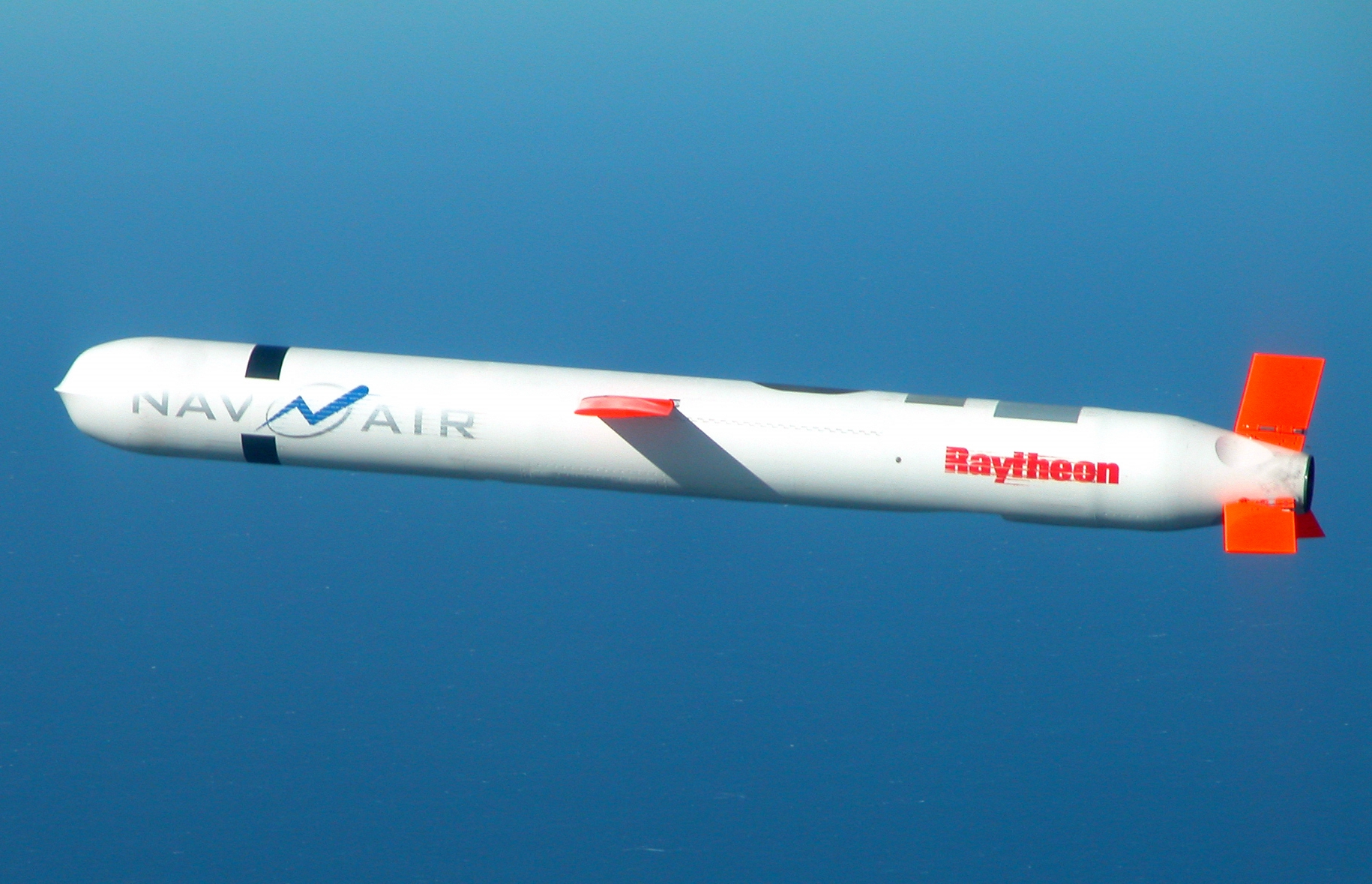
A BGM-109 Tomahawk flying in November 2002

A cruise missile is an unmanned self-propelled guided missile that sustains flight through aerodynamic lift for most of its flight path. Cruise missiles are designed to deliver a large warhead or payload over long distances with high precision. Modern cruise missiles are capable of traveling at high subsonic, supersonic, or hypersonic speeds, are self-navigating, and are able to fly on a non-ballistic, extremely low-altitude trajectory.

== History ==
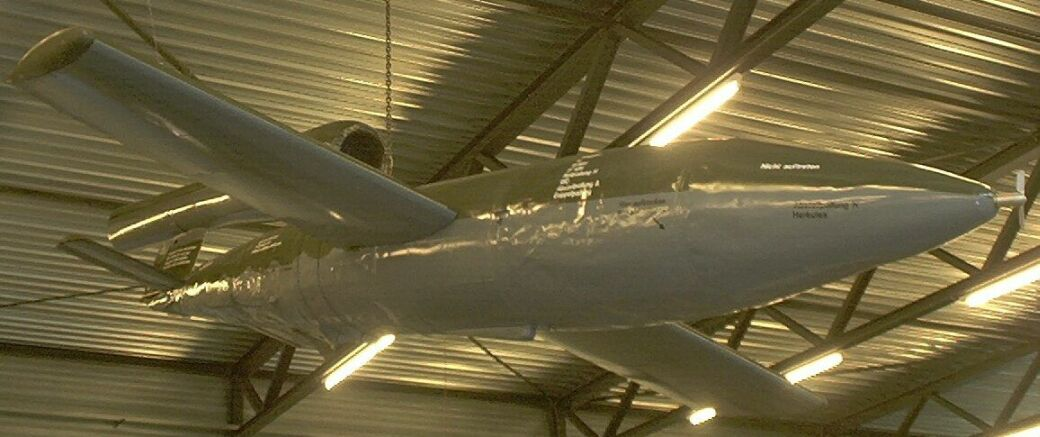
The V-1 flying bomb, the first operational cruise missile

In 1916, the American aviator Lawrence Sperry built and patented an "aerial torpedo", the Hewitt-Sperry Automatic Airplane, a small biplane carrying a TNT charge, a Sperry autopilot and barometric altitude control. Inspired by the experiments, the United States Army developed a similar flying bomb called the Kettering Bug. Germany had also flown trials with remote-controlled aerial gliders (Torpedogleiter) built by Siemens-Schuckert beginning in 1916.

In the interwar period, Britain's Royal Aircraft Establishment developed the Larynx (Long Range Gun with Lynx Engine), which underwent a few flight tests in the 1920s.

In the Soviet Union, Sergei Korolev headed the GIRD-06 cruise missile project from 1932 to 1939, which used a rocket-powered boost-glide bomb design. The 06/III (RP-216) and 06/IV (RP-212) contained gyroscopic guidance systems. The vehicle was designed to boost to 28 km (17 mi) altitude and glide a distance of 280 km (170 mi), but test flights in 1934 and 1936 only reached an altitude of 500 metres (1,600 ft).

In 1944, during World War II, Germany deployed the first operational cruise missiles. The V-1, often called a flying bomb, contained a gyroscope guidance system and was propelled by a simple pulsejet engine, the sound of which gave it the nickname of "buzz bomb" or "doodlebug". Accuracy was sufficient only for use against very large targets (the general area of a city), while the range of 250 km (160 mi) was significantly lower than that of a bomber carrying the same payload. The main advantages were speed (although not sufficient to outperform contemporary propeller-driven interceptors) and expendability. The production cost of a V-1 was only a small fraction of that of a V-2 supersonic ballistic missile with a similar-sized warhead. Unlike the V-2, the initial deployments of the V-1 required stationary launch ramps which were susceptible to bombardment. Bomber-launched variants of the V-1 saw limited operational service near the end of the war, with the pioneering V-1's design reverse-engineered by the Americans as the Republic-Ford JB-2 cruise missile.

Immediately after World War II, the United States Air Force had 21 different guided missile projects, including proposed cruise missiles. By 1948, all but four of these projects had been canceled: the Air Materiel Command Banshee, the SM-62 Snark, the SM-64 Navaho, and the MGM-1 Matador. The Banshee design was similar to Operation Aphrodite; like Aphrodite, it failed, and was canceled in April 1949. Concurrently, the US Navy's Operation Bumblebee, was conducted at Topsail Island, North Carolina, from c. 1 June 1946, to 28 July 1948. Bumblebee produced proof-of-concept technologies that influenced the US military's other missile projects.

During the Cold War, both the United States and the Soviet Union experimented further with the concept, of deploying early cruise missiles from land, submarines, and aircraft. The main outcome of the United States Navy submarine missile project was the SSM-N-8 Regulus missile, based upon the V-1 but powered by an Allison J33 jet engine. The Regulus entered service but was phased out with the advent of submarine launched ballistic missiles that did not require the submarine to surface in order to launch the missile and guide it to its target.

The United States Air Force's first operational surface-to-surface missile was the winged, mobile, nuclear-capable MGM-1 Matador, also similar in concept to the V-1. Deployment overseas began in 1954, first to West Germany and later to the Republic of China and South Korea. On 7 November 1956, the U.S. Air Force deployed Matador units in West Germany, whose missiles were capable of striking targets in the Warsaw Pact, from their fixed day-to-day sites to unannounced dispersed launch locations. This alert was in response to the crisis posed by the Soviet attack on Hungary which suppressed the Hungarian Revolution of 1956.

Between 1957 and 1961 the United States followed an ambitious and well-funded program to develop a nuclear-powered cruise missile, Supersonic Low Altitude Missile (SLAM). It was designed to fly below the enemy's radar at speeds above Mach 3 and carry hydrogen bombs that it would drop along its path over enemy territory. Although the concept was proven sound and the 500-megawatt (670,000 hp) engine finished a successful test run in 1961, no airworthy device was ever completed. The project was finally abandoned in favor of ICBM development.

While ballistic missiles were the preferred weapons for land targets, heavy nuclear and conventional weapon tipped cruise missiles were seen by the USSR as a primary weapon to destroy United States naval carrier battle groups. Large submarines (for example, Echo and Oscar classes) were developed to carry these weapons and shadow United States battle groups at sea, and large bombers (for example, Backfire, Bear, and Blackjack models) were equipped with the weapons in their air-launched cruise missile (ALCM) configuration.

== List of cruise missiles by type ==
Cruise missiles can be categorized by payload/warhead size, speed, range, and launch platform. Often variants of the same missile are produced for different launch platforms (for instance, air- and submarine-launched versions). Guidance systems vary across missiles. Cruise missiles can be fitted with any of a variety of navigation systems (inertial navigation, TERCOM, or satellite navigation). Larger cruise missiles can carry either a conventional or a nuclear warhead, while smaller ones carry only conventional warheads.

=== Hypersonic ===
A hypersonic cruise missile travels at least five times the speed of sound (Mach 5).

- ASN4G (Air-Sol Nucléaire de 4e Génération) – scramjet-powered missile being developed by France
- BrahMos-II (≈800–1500 km) – under development in 2022 as of 2011 in India and Russia
- CJ-1000 – scramjet anti-ship/land-attack missile
- HSTDV – scramjet demonstrator. A carrier vehicle for hypersonic long-range cruise missiles is being developed by Defence Research and Development Organisation.
- ET-LDHCM – long-range missile being developed by DRDO
- Hypersonic Air-breathing Weapon Concept (HAWC) – scramjet-powered air-launched missile without a warhead that uses its own kinetic energy upon impact to destroy the target, developed by DARPA
- Hypersonic Air Launched Offensive Anti-Surface (HALO) – air-launched anti-ship missile under Offensive Anti-Surface Warfare Increment 2 (OASuW Inc 2) program for the US Navy
- Hypersonic Attack Cruise Missile (HACM) – planned for use by the United States Air Force
- SCIFiRE – Southern Cross Integrated Flight Research Experiment (SCIFiRE) is a joint program between the US Department of Defense and the Australian Department of Defence for a Mach 5 scramjet-powered missile. In September 2021, the US Department of Defense awarded Preliminary Design Review contracts to Boeing, Lockheed Martin and Raytheon Missiles & Defense.
- YJ-19 – scramjet anti-ship missile

=== Supersonic ===
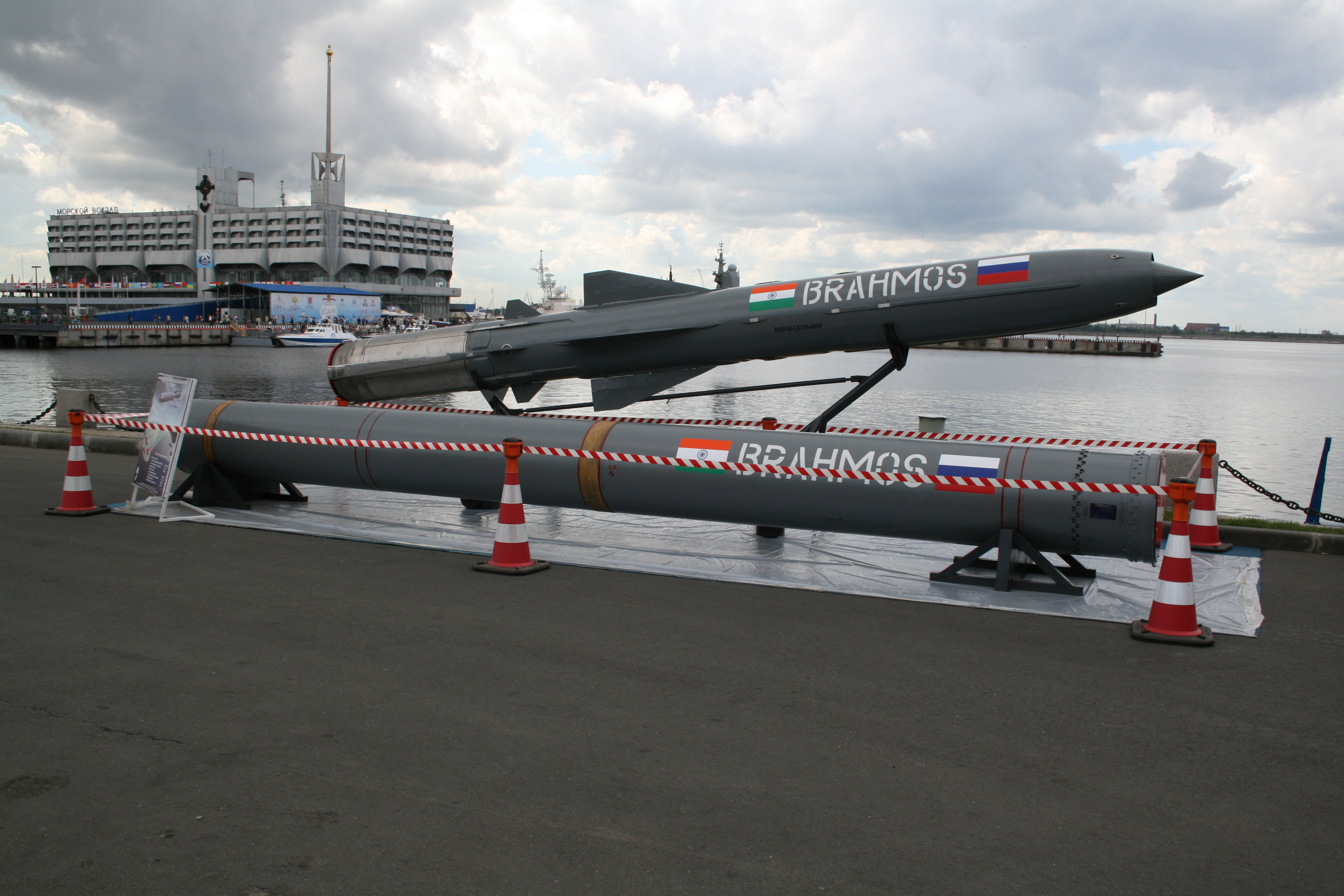
BrahMos shown at IMDS 2007

These missiles travel faster than the speed of sound, usually using ramjet engines. The range is typically 100–500 km but can be greater. Guidance systems vary.

Examples:

- ASALM US ALCM prototype, test-flown to hypersonic Mach 5.5
- 3M-51 Alfa (250 km, Mach 2.5)
- Air-Sol Moyenne Portée (300–500 km+, Mach 3) – stand-off nuclear missile
- ASM-3 (400 km, Mach 3+)
- Blyskavka (100–370 km) – Artem Luch Pivdenmash
- BrahMos (290–800 km, Mach 3)
- CX-1 (280 km, Mach 3)
- CJ-100 / DF-100 (2000–3000 km, Mach 5)
- Fatah-lll (300 km, Mach 3 – 4)
- FC/ASW (under development) – transnational cruise missile programme
- Hsiung Feng III (100–150 km, Mach 3.5)
- Hyunmoo-3D (1500 km, Mach 1.2)
- Kh-20 (380–600 km, Mach 2)
- Kh-31 (25–110 km, Mach 3.5)
- Kh-32 (600–1,000 km, Mach 4.6)
- Kh-80 (3,000–5,000 km, Mach 3)
- P-270 Moskit (120–250 km, Mach 2–3)
- P-500 Bazalt (550 km, Mach 3+)
- P-700 Granit (625 km, Mach 2.5+)
- P-800 Oniks / Kh-61 (600–800 km, Mach 2.6)
- P-1000 Vulkan (800 km, Mach 3+)
- YJ-12 (250–400 km, Mach 4)
- YJ-18 (220–540 km, Mach 3)
- YJ-91 (15–120 km, Mach 3.5)
- Yun Feng (1200–2,000 km, Mach 3)
- SSM-N-9 Regulus II (1,852 km, Mach 2)

==== Intercontinental-range supersonic ====
- Burya (8,500 km) (cancelled in 1960)
- MKR (8,000 km) (cancelled in 1960)
- RSS-40 Buran (8,500 km) (cancelled in 1957)
- SLAM (cancelled in 1964)
- SM-64 Navaho (cancelled in 1958)

=== Long-range subsonic ===
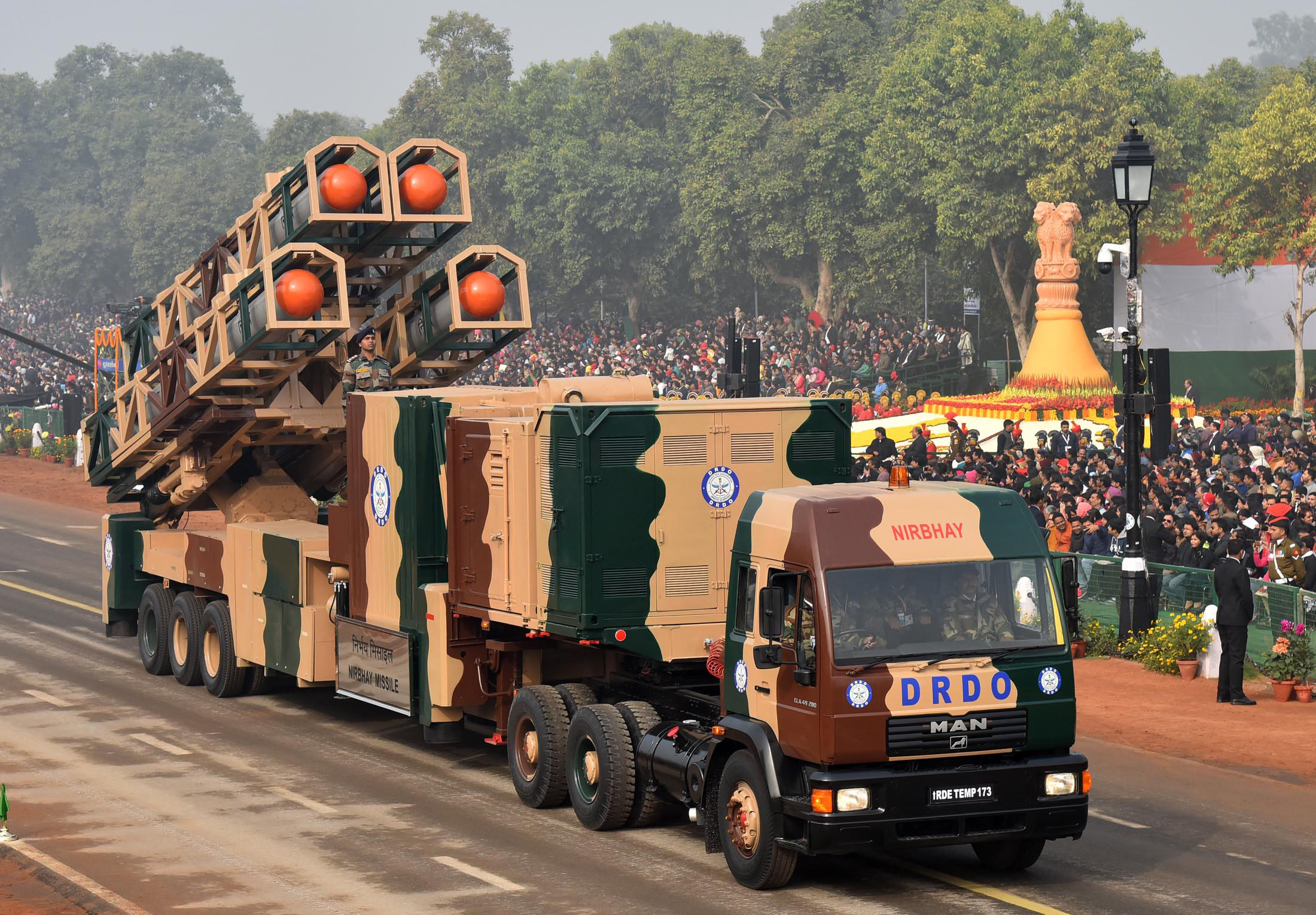
India's Nirbhay missiles mounted on a truck-based launcher

China, France, India, Iran, Israel, Japan, North Korea, Russia, South Korea, Ukraine, and the United States have developed several long-range subsonic cruise missiles. These missiles have a range of over 1,000 kilometres (620 mi) and fly at about 800 kilometres per hour (500 mph). They typically have a launch weight of about 1,500 kilograms (3,300 lb) and can carry either a conventional or a nuclear warhead. Earlier versions of these missiles used inertial navigation; later versions use much more accurate TERCOM and DSMAC systems. Most recent versions can use satellite navigation.

Examples:

- 3M-54 Kalibr (up to 4,500 km) (Russia)
- AGM-86 ALCM (from 1,100 to >2,400 km) (United States)
- AGM-129 ACM (from 3,450 to 3,700 km) (United States)
- AGM-181 LRSO (>2,500 km) (United States)
- BGM-109 Tomahawk (up to 1,700 km) (United States)
  - BGM-109G Ground Launched Cruise Missile (2,500 km) (United States)
- Kh-55 (3,000 km) and Kh-65 (Russia)
- Kh-101 (4,500–5,500 km) (Russia)
- Iskander-K (not less than 3,500 km) (Russia)
- Hwasal-1 (1,500–2,000 km) (North Korea)
- Hwasal-2 (> 2,000 km) (North Korea)
- RK-55 (3,000 km) (Soviet Union)
- Nirbhay (up to 1,500 km) (India)
- MdCN (up to 1,400 km) (France)
- Paveh (1,650 km) (Iran)
- Hoveyzeh (1,350 km) (Iran)
- Abu Mahdi (over 1,000 km) (Iran)
- Fatah-V (1,000 km) (Pakistan)
- Quds 1 Houthi (Yemen)
- Hsiung Feng IIE (600–1,200 km) (Taiwan)
- Hyunmoo III (Hyunmoo IIIA – 500 km, Hyunmoo IIIB – 1,000 km, Hyunmoo IIIC – 1,500 km) (South Korea)
- Type 12 SSM (1,500 km under development) (Japan)
- MGM-13 Mace (United States)
- DF-10/CJ-10 (CJ-10K – 1,500 km, CJ-20 – 2,000 km) (China)
- Popeye Turbo SLCM (Israel)
- Deep Precision Strike Capability DPSC (over 2,000 km under development) (Germany) (United Kingdom) , part of the Trinity House Agreement.
- FP-5 Flamingo (3,000 km) (Ukraine)

==== Intercontinental-range subsonic ====
- 9M730 Burevestnik (Russia)
- SM-62 Snark (10,200 km, withdrawn from service in 1961) (United States)

=== Medium-range subsonic ===
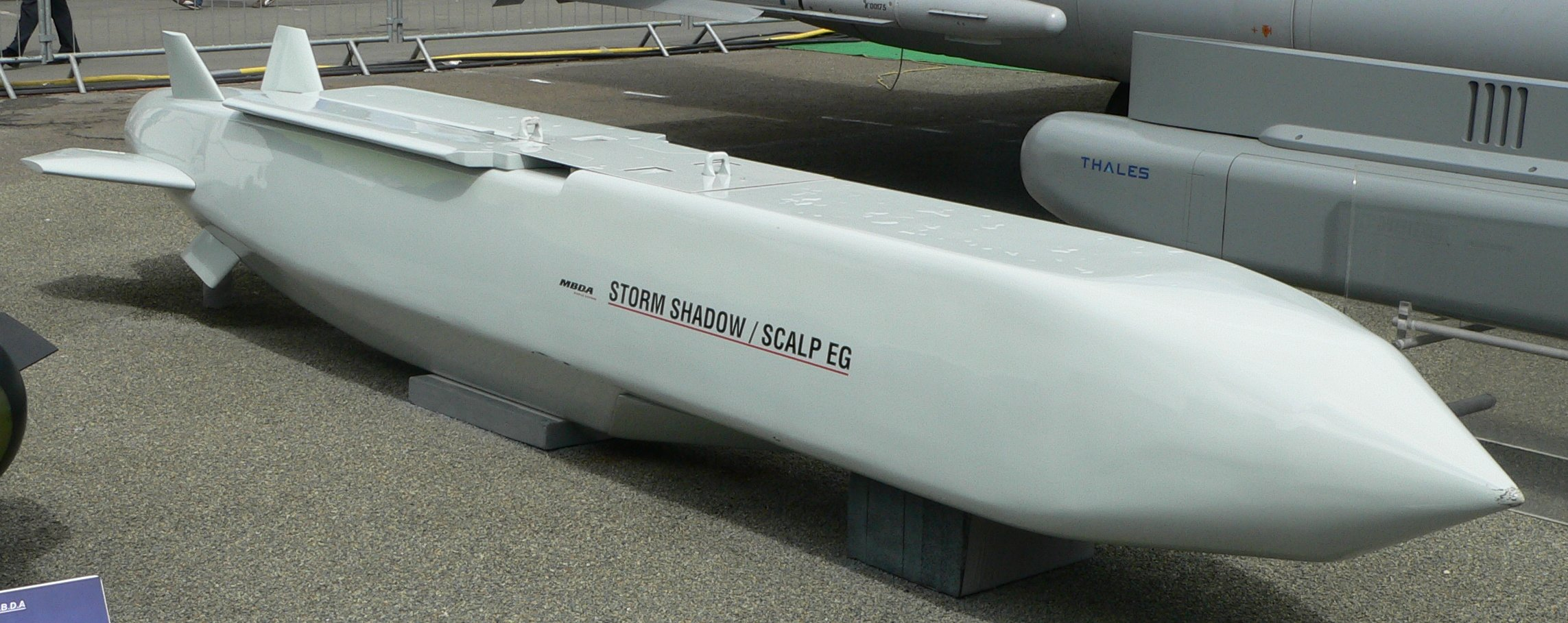
Storm Shadow (France / UK)

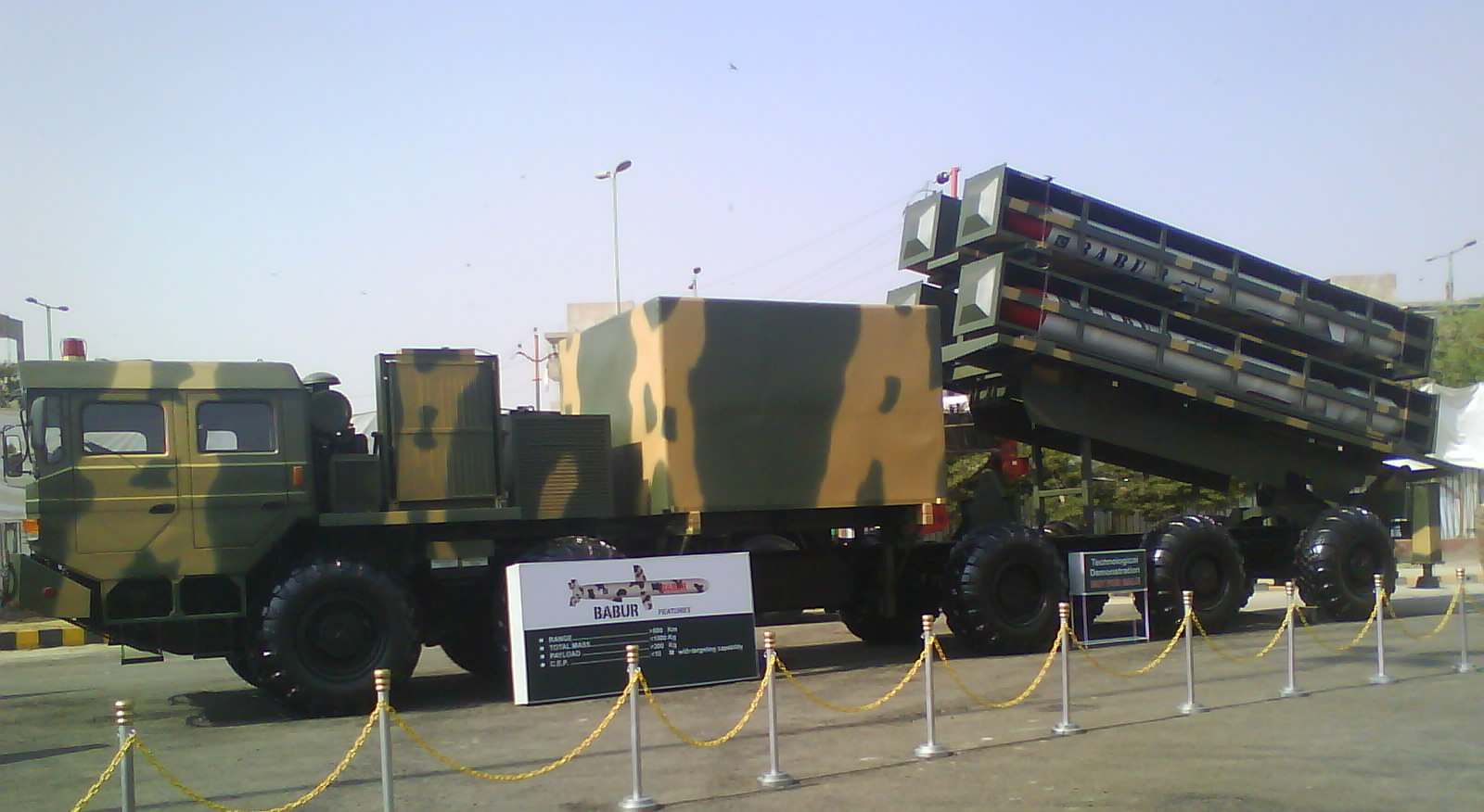
A Pakistani Babur cruise missile launcher

These subsonic missiles have ranges between 300 km and 1000 km.

Examples:

- AGM-158 JASSM (370–1900 km)
- AGM-158C LRASM (370 km)
- Atmaca
- Babur (290–900 km)
- Harbah (250–450 km)
- Hatf-VIII / Ra'ad Mark-2 ALCM (400 km)
- Hsiung Feng IIE (600–2000 km)
- Hyunmoo-3 (within 1500 km)
- Iskander-K
- KD-63
- NASM-MR
- Taurus KEPD 350 (500+ km)
- Kh-50 (Kh-SD) and Kh-101 Kh-65 variants
- MGM-1 Matador (700 km)
- Ra'ad (350 km)
- Ra'ad-II (600 km)
- Raad (360 km)
- SOM (SOM B Block I) – 500 km, 1500 km and 2500 km versions (350 km range under serial production, 500 km+ range under development)
- SSM-N-8 Regulus (926 km)
- P-5 Pyatyorka (450–750 km)
- S8000 Banderol
- Storm Shadow / SCALP-EG (550 km, Mach 0.65)
- Type 12 SSM (within 1000 km under development)
- Ya-Ali (700 km)
- Zarb (320 km)
- Ragnarök (926 km)
- Narwhal(680 km)
- Taimoor (600 km)
- Lanca (600 km)
- Destinus Ruta (block 1: 300 km, block 2: 700 km)

=== Short-range subsonic ===
These are subsonic missiles that weigh around 500 kilograms (1,102 lb) and have a range of up to 300 km (190 mi).

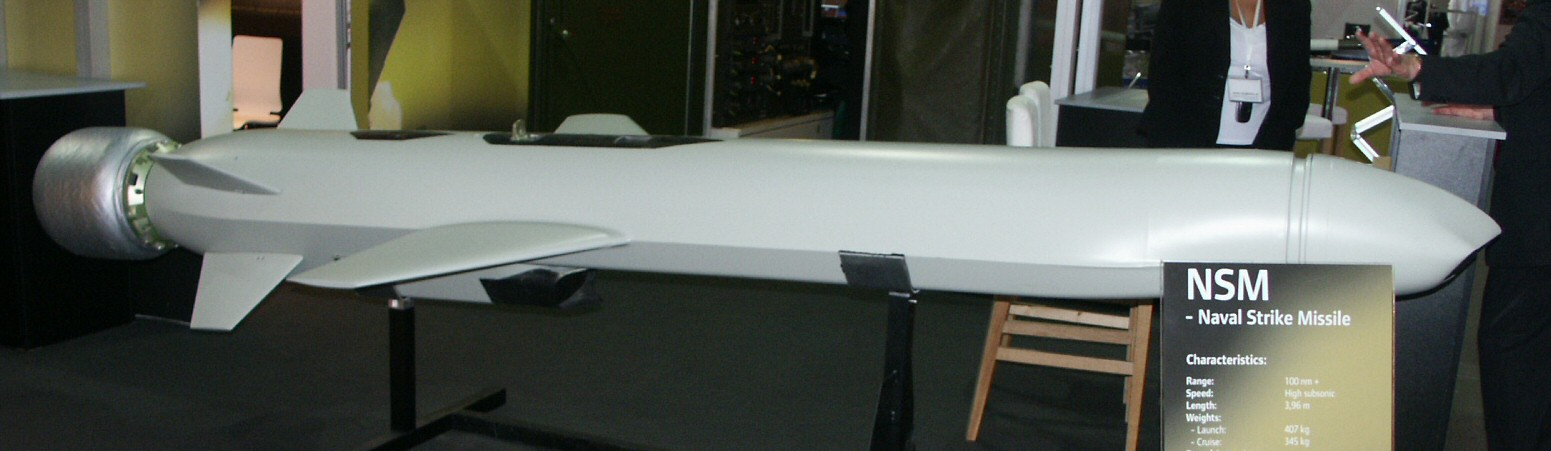
A Naval Strike Missile of the Norwegian Navy

Examples:

- Apache (100–140 km) (France)
- AVMT-300 (300 km) (Brazil)
- MICLA-BR (300 km) (Brazil)
- Hyunmoo-3 (over 300 km) shorter range (South Korea)
- SSM-700K Haeseong (180+ km) (South Korea)
- JFS-M (499 km) (Germany)
- Kh-35 (130–300 km) (Russia) , KN-19 Ks3/4 (North Korea)
- Kh-59 (115–550 km) (Russia)
- P-15 (40–80 km) (Russia) , KN-1 (North Korea)
- Nasr-1 (Iran)
- Zafar (25 km) (Iran)
- Noor (Iran)
- Qader (Iran)
- NASM-SR (India)
- Naval Strike Missile (185–555 km) (Norway)
- RBS-15 (Sweden)
- Korshun (Ukraine) – local derivative of Kh-55 and RK-55
- Neptune (Ukraine)

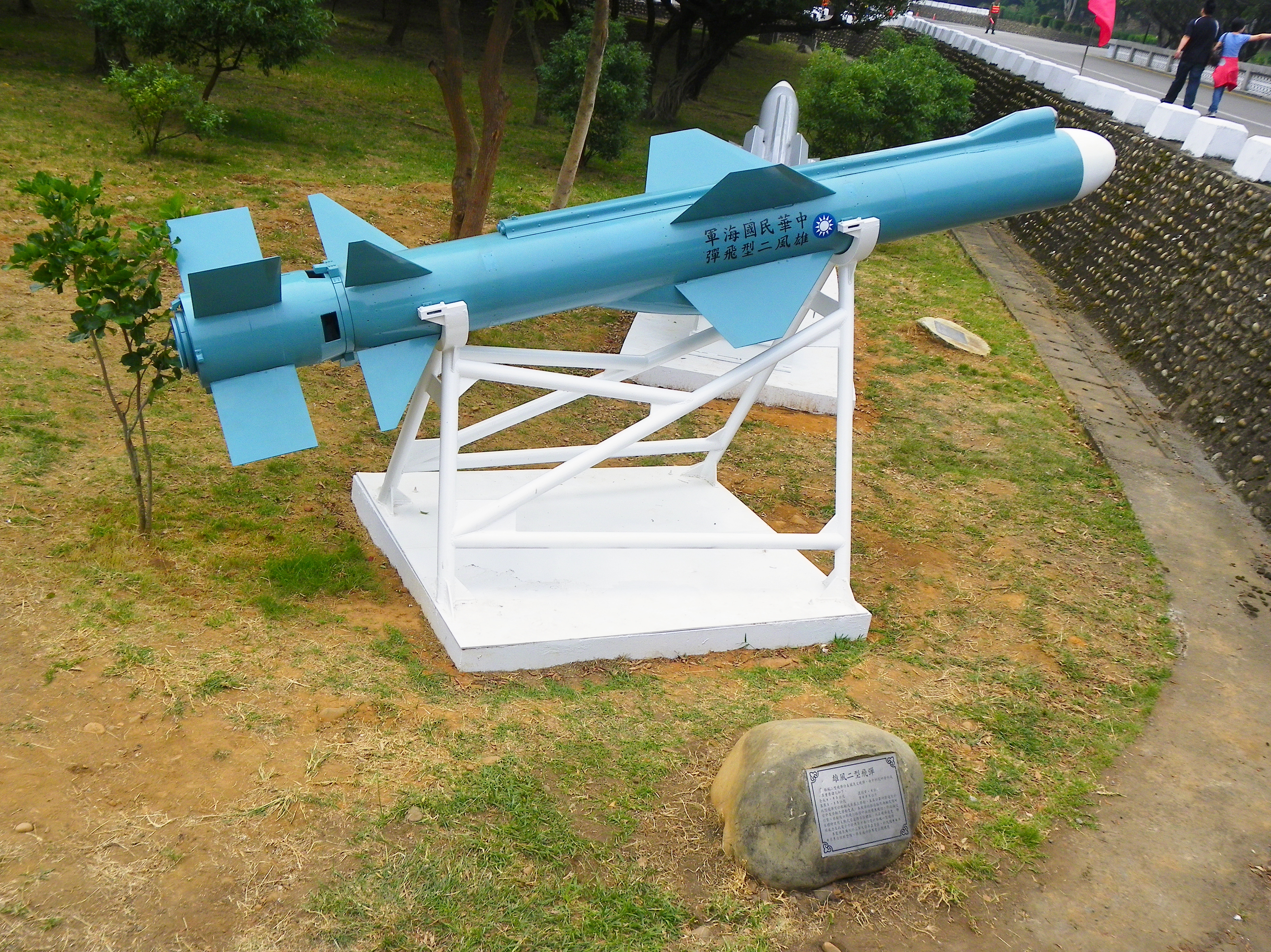
Hsiung Feng II Anti-Ship Missile Display in Chengkungling

Hsiung Feng II

- Hsiung Feng II (Taiwan)
- Wan Chien (Taiwan)
- VCM-01 (100–300 km) (Vietnam)
- Aist (100–300 km) (Belarus)
- Marte (100+ km) (Italy)
  - Sea Killer export variant (Italy)
- Otomat (180 km) (France) / (Italy)
  - Otomat Mk2 E / Teseo Mk2/E (360 km) (Italy)
- C-801 (40 km) (China)
- C-802 (120–230 km) (China)
- C-803 (China)
- C-805 (China)
- C-602 (China)
- CM-602G (China)
- Çakır (Turkey)
- KaGeM V3 (150 km) (Pakistan) / (Turkey)
- Delilah missile (250 km) (Israel)
- Gabriel IV (200 km) (Israel)
- Popeye turbo ALCM (78 km) (Israel)
- Sea Breaker (300 km) (Israel)
- RGM-84 Harpoon (124–310 km) (United States)
- AGM-84E Standoff Land Attack Missile (110 km) (United States)
- AGM-84H/K SLAM-ER (270 km) (United States)
- Silkworm (100–500 km) (China)
- SOM (Turkey)
- V-1 flying bomb (250 km) (Nazi Germany)
- Jackal (cruise missile) by Northrop Grumman (125 km) (United States)

== Deployment ==
=== General ===
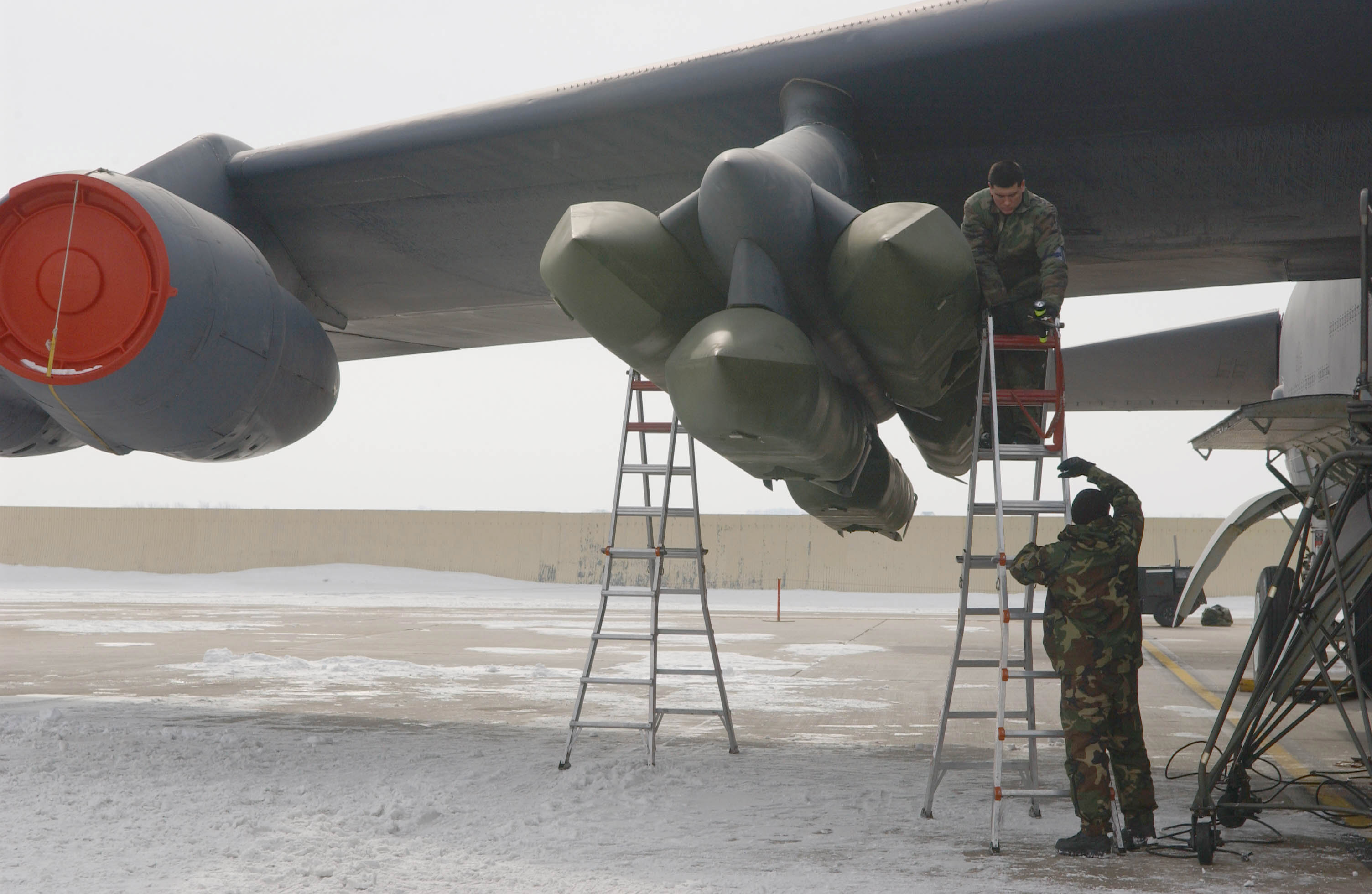
AGM-129 ACM being secured on a B-52H bomber

The most common mission for cruise missiles is to attack high-value targets such as ships, command bunkers, bridges and dams. Modern guidance systems permit accurate attacks.

As of 2001, the BGM-109 Tomahawk missile model has become a significant part of the United States naval arsenal. It gives ships and submarines a somewhat accurate, long-range, conventional land attack weapon. Each costs about US$1.99 million. Both the Tomahawk and the AGM-86 were used extensively during Operation Desert Storm. On 7 April 2017, during the Syrian Civil War, U.S. warships fired more than 50 cruise missiles into a Syrian airbase in retaliation for a Syrian chemical weapons attack against a rebel stronghold.

The United States Air Force (USAF) deploys an air-launched cruise missile, the AGM-86 ALCM. The Boeing B-52 Stratofortress is the exclusive delivery vehicle for the AGM-86 and AGM-129 ACM. Both missile types are configurable for either conventional or nuclear warheads.

The USAF adopted the AGM-86 for its bomber fleet while AGM-109 was adapted to launch from trucks and ships and adopted by the USAF and Navy. The truck-launched versions, and also the Pershing II and SS-20 Intermediate Range Ballistic Missiles, were later destroyed under the bilateral INF (Intermediate-Range Nuclear Forces) treaty with the USSR.

The British Royal Navy (RN) also operates cruise missiles, specifically the U.S.-made Tomahawk, used by the RN's nuclear submarine fleet. UK conventional warhead versions were first fired in combat by the RN in 1999, during the Kosovo War (the United States fired cruise missiles in 1991). The Royal Air Force uses the Storm Shadow cruise missile on its Typhoon and previously its Tornado GR4 aircraft. It is also used by France, where it is known as SCALP EG, and carried by the Armée de l'Air's Mirage 2000 and Rafale aircraft.

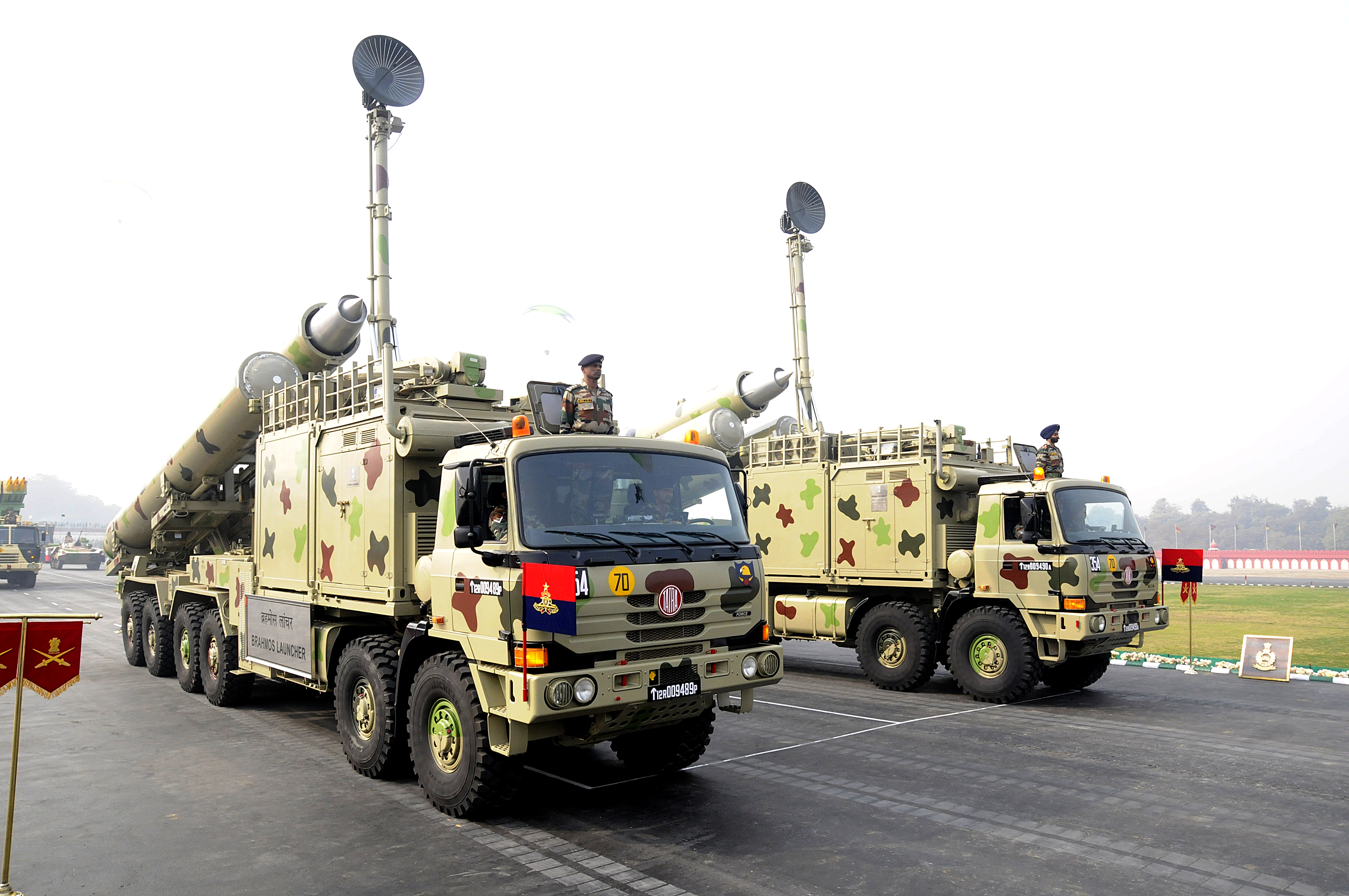
The Indian Army's BrahMos supersonic cruise missiles mounted on Mobile Autonomous Launchers (MAL)

India and Russia have jointly developed the supersonic cruise missile BrahMos. There are three versions of the Brahmos: ship/land-launched, air-launched, and sub-launched. The ship/land-launched version was operational as of late 2007. The Brahmos have the capability to attack targets on land. Russia also continues to operate other cruise missiles: the SS-N-12 Sandbox, SS-N-19 Shipwreck, SS-N-22 Sunburn and SS-N-25 Switchblade. Germany and Spain operate the Taurus missile while Pakistan has made the Babur missile Both the People's Republic of China and the Republic of China (Taiwan) have designed several cruise missile variants, such as the well-known C-802, some of which are capable of carrying biological, chemical, nuclear, and conventional warheads.

=== Nuclear warhead versions ===
==== China ====
China has the CJ-10 land attack cruise missile which is capable of carrying a nuclear warhead. Additionally, China appears to have tested a hypersonic cruise missile in August 2021, a claim it denies.

==== France ====
The French Force de frappe nuclear forces include both land and sea-based bombers with Air-Sol Moyenne Portée (ASMP) high-speed medium-range nuclear cruise missiles. Two models are in use, ASMP and a newer ASMP-Amelioré (ASMP-A), which was developed in 1999. An estimated 40 to 50 were produced.

==== India ====
India in 2017 successfully flight-tested its indigenous Nirbhay ('Fearless') land-attack cruise missile, which can deliver nuclear warheads to a strike range of 1,000 km. Nirbhay had been flight-tested successfully.

==== Israel ====
The Israel Defense Forces reportedly deploy the medium-range air-launched Popeye Turbo ALCM and the Popeye Turbo SLCM medium-long range cruise missile with nuclear warheads on Dolphin class submarines.

==== Pakistan ====
Pakistan currently has five cruise missile systems: the air-launched Ra'ad-I and its enhanced version Ra'ad-II as well as Taimoor; the ground and submarine launched Babur; ship-launched Harbah missile and surface launched Zarb missile. Both, Ra'ad and Babur, can carry nuclear warheads between 10 and 25 kt, and deliver them to targets at a range of up to 300 km (190 mi) and 450 km (280 mi) respectively. Babur has been in service with the Pakistan Army since 2010, and Pakistan Navy since 2018.

==== Russia ====
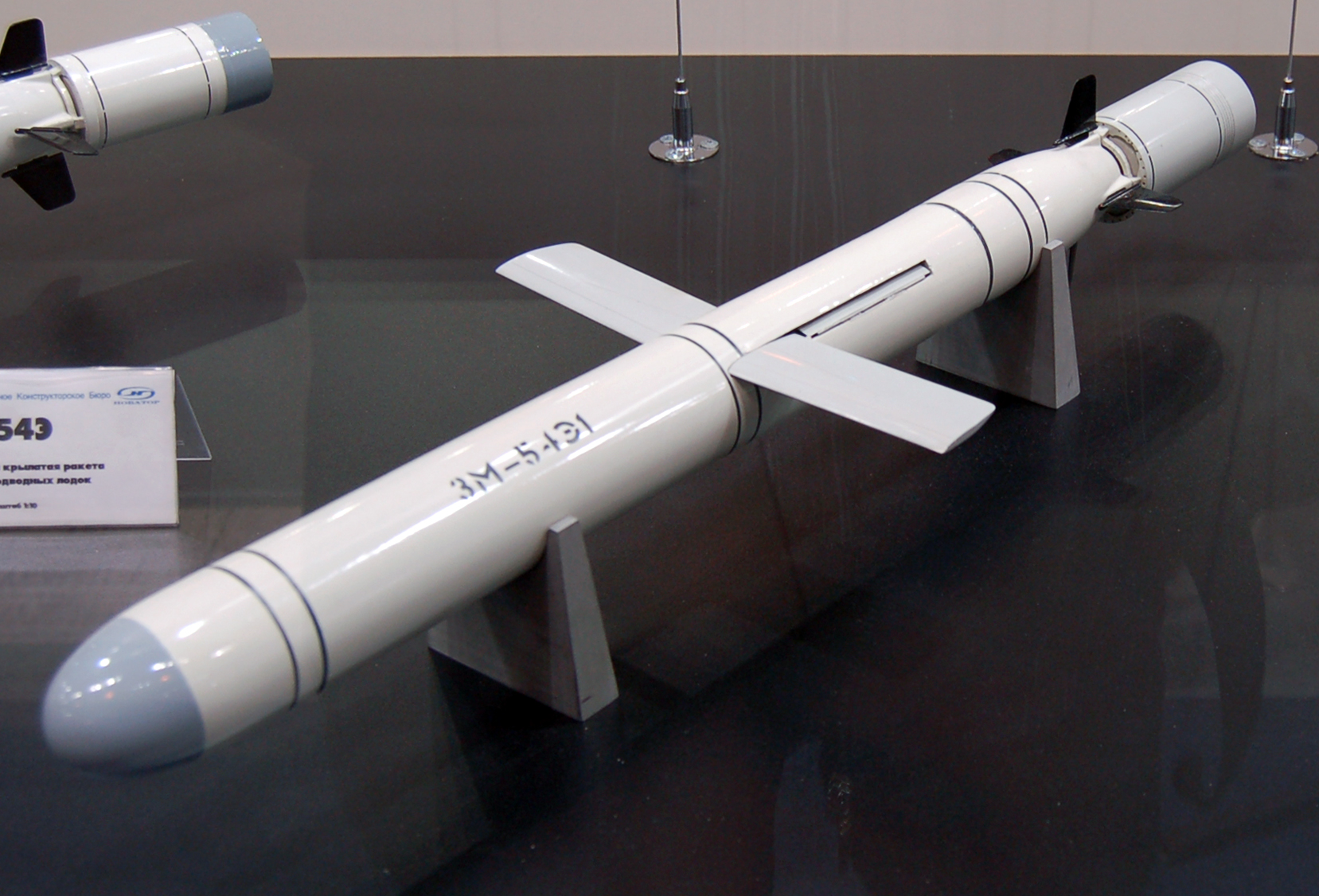
Export variant of the Kalibr missile

Russia has Kh-55SM cruise missiles, with a range similar to the United States' AGM-129 range of 3000 km, but are able to carry a more powerful warhead of 200 kt. They are equipped with a TERCOM system which allows them to cruise at an altitude lower than 110 meters at subsonic speeds while obtaining a CEP accuracy of 15 meters with an inertial navigation system. They are air-launched from either Tupolev Tu-95s, Tupolev Tu-22Ms, or Tupolev Tu-160s, each able to carry 16 for the Tu-95, 12 for the Tu-160, and 4 for the Tu-22M. A stealth version of the missile, the Kh-101 is in development. It has similar qualities as the Kh-55, except that its range has been extended to 5,000 km, is equipped with a 1,000 kg conventional warhead, and has stealth features which reduce its probability of intercept.

After the collapse of the Soviet Union, the most recent cruise missile developed was the Kalibr missile which entered production in the early 1990s and was officially inducted into the Russian arsenal in 1994. However, it only saw its combat debut on 7 October 2015, in Syria as a part of the Russian military campaign in Syria. The missile has been used 14 more times in combat operations in Syria since its debut.

In the late 1950s and early 1960s, the Soviet Union was attempting to develop cruise missiles. In this short time frame, the Soviet Union was working on nearly ten different types of cruise missiles. However, due to resources, most of the initial types of cruise missiles developed by the Soviet Union were Sea-Launched Cruise Missiles or Submarine-Launched Cruise Missiles (SLCMs). The SS-N-1 cruise missile was developed to have different configurations to be fired from a submarine or a ship. However, as time progressed, the Soviet Union began to work on air-launched cruise missiles as well (ALCM). These ACLM missiles were typically delivered via bombers designated as "Blinders" or "Backfire". The missiles in this configuration were called the AS-1, and AS-2 with eventual new variants with more development time. The main purpose of Soviet-based cruise missiles was to have defense and offensive mechanisms against enemy ships; in other words, most of the Soviet cruise missiles were anti-ship missiles. In the 1980s the Soviet Union had developed an arsenal of cruise missiles nearing 600 platforms which consisted of land, sea, and air delivery systems.

==== United States ====
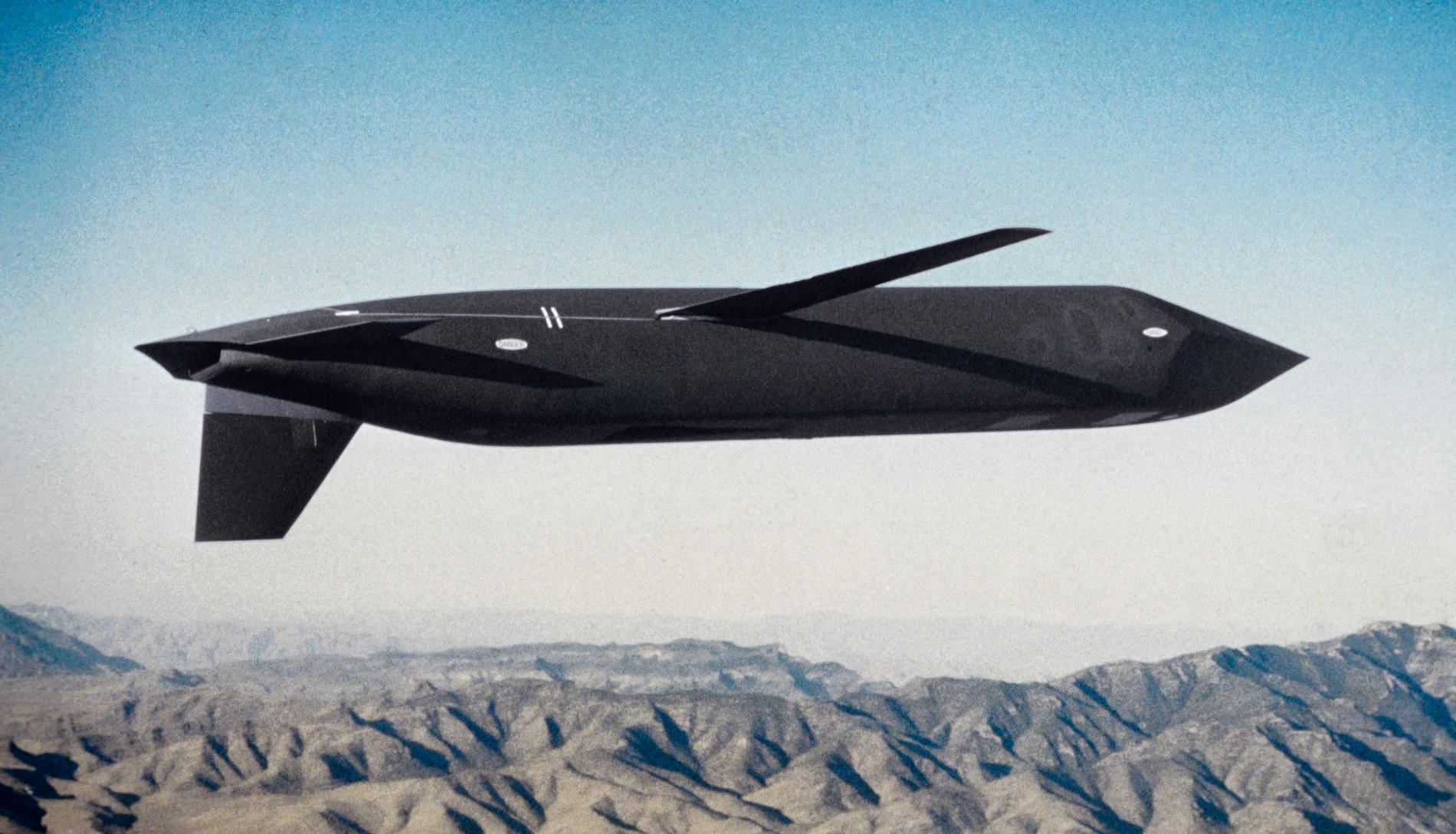
An AGM-129 ACM of the United States Air Force

The United States has deployed nine nuclear cruise missiles at one time or another.

- MGM-1 Matador ground-launched missile, out of service
- MGM-13 Mace ground-launched missile, out of service
- SSM-N-8 Regulus submarine-launched missile, out of service
- SM-62 Snark ground-launched missile, out of service
- AGM-28 Hound Dog air-launched missile, out of service
- BGM-109G Ground Launched Cruise Missile, out of service
- AGM-129 ACM air-launched missile, out of service
- AGM-86 ALCM air-launched cruise missile, 350 to 550 missiles and W80 warheads still in service
- BGM-109 Tomahawk cruise missile in nuclear submarine-, surface ship-, and ground-launched models, nuclear models out of service but warheads kept in reserve.

== See also ==
- Cruise missile submarine
- Glide bomb – similar in concept but unpowered
- One-way attack drone
- List of rocket aircraft
- Lists of weapons
- NATO reporting name – includes lists of Soviet missiles
- Eugene Vielle – pioneer of technology that led to the cruise missile
- Weapon of mass destruction
