= Taimoor =

Pakistani air-launched cruise missile

- Type: Air-launched cruise missile (ALCM); Air to surface missile
- Place of origin: Pakistan

Service history
- Used by: Pakistan Armed Forces; Pakistan Air Force; Pakistan Navy

Production history
- Designer: Air Weapons Complex
- Designed: 2022
- Manufacturer: GIDS
- Developed from: Ra'ad-II

Specifications
- Mass: <1,200 kg (2,600 lb)
- Length: 4.38 m (172 in)
- Wingspan: 3.2 m (130 in)
- Maximum firing range: 600 km (370 mi); Export variant: 290 km (180 mi)
- Warhead: HE
- Engine: Turbo-jet
- Flight ceiling: 7,620 m (25,000 ft)
- Flight altitude: 6,096 m (20,000 ft)
- Maximum speed: Upto Mach 0.8
- Launch platform: MRF Mirage-IIIR; Mirage V JF-17

The Taimoor (Urdu: تیمور, also known as Taimur) is a low-observable high-precision air-launched cruise missile (ALCM) developed by the Pakistan Air Force's Air Weapons Complex. It was unveiled to the international market during the IDEAS-2022 defense exhibition in November 2022, and is a direct contender to MBDA's Storm Shadow and Roketsan's SOM.

The Taimoor is capable of striking both stationary and moving targets at a standoff distance of 600 kilometers. It has also been successfully tested as an anti-ship missile and has demonstrated the ability to follow a sea-skimming flight path. Although it is manufactured by AWC, Global Industrial Defence Solutions (GIDS) oversees marketing of the missile for export.

== Development ==
The Taimoor is an conventional non-nuclear derivative of the Ra'ad-II ALCM with improved sub-systems. The export variant's range is reportedly capped by engineers to 290 km in order to comply with MTCR policies. Meanwhile, the Pakistan Air Force (PAF) confirmed that the Taimoor had a maximum range of 600 km after announcing a successful test flight of the missile.

== Design ==
The Taimoor features a box-shaped fuselage X-type tail control surfaces, mid-body foldable wings, and underside air-intake for a miniature turbojet engine. Furthermore, it also utilizes low-observability design characteristics in its airframe which are aimed at reducing its radar cross-section. Similar to its ancestors of the Ra'ad ALCM series, the Taimoor retains its terrain hugging capability which coupled with its stealthy design makes it an effective weapon for SEAD operations in warfare.

According to the PAF, the missile has a range of 600 km (370 mi). The Taimoor weighs less than 1,200 kg, and is capable of cruise flight at an altitude of between 152 m (500 ft) and 6,096 m (20,000 ft) at a subsonic speed and possesses terrain-hugging and sea-skimming capabilities. It also has a launch altitude of between 610 m (2,000 ft) and 7,620 m (25,000 ft).

== Operational history ==
On 3 January 2026, the first successful test flight of the Taimoor was carried out by the Pakistan Air Force (PAF), in which the missile was launched from a PAF Dassault Mirage III and struck a land target. Later on 21 April 2026, the Pakistan Navy test fired one in anti-ship configuration during which it successfully hit its target.

== Operators ==
- Pakistan
  - Pakistan Air Force
  - Pakistan Navy

== See also ==
- Storm Shadow – (France, United Kingdom)
- 3M14A – (Russia)
- AGM-129 ACM – (United States)
- AGM-158 JASSM – (United States)
- Delilah – (Israel)
- HN-1 – (China)
- HOPE/HOSBO – (Germany)
- Joint Strike Missile – (Norway)
- KD-88 – (China)
- Kh-55 – (Soviet Union)
- Kh-61/P-800 – (Russia)
- MTC-300 – (Brazil)
- Popeye – (Israel)
- Saber – (United Arab Emirates)
- SOM (missile) – (Turkey)
- Taurus KEPD 350 – (Sweden, Germany)
- Wan Chien – (Taiwan)
- YJ-12 – (China)
