= CJ-1000 =

CJ1000 or CJ-1000 may refer to:

- ACAE CJ-1000A, a Chinese high-bypass turbofan engine
- CJ-1000 (missile), a Chinese hypersonic cruise missile
