= AIST =

AIST or Aist may refer to:

== Organizations ==
- African Institute of Science and Technology
- Nelson Mandela African Institute of Science and Technology
- National Institute of Advanced Industrial Science and Technology, one of the biggest research institutions in Japan
- Association for Iron and Steel Technology, the main group for ferrous metallurgists in the US
- Aist Bicycles, Belarusian bicycle company

== Places ==
- Aist (river), in Austria
- Wartberg ob der Aist, a town on the river Aist
- Aist parish (Gemeinde) in Naarn im Machlande on the river Aist

== People with the surname ==
- Dietmar von Aist, 12th century minnesinger from the region of the Aist river

== Technology ==
- AgInSbTe, an alloy used in rewritable CDs
- Aist-class LCAC, assault hovercraft operated by the Soviet and Russian Navy
- Khrunichev T-411 Aist, Russian light utility monoplane
- Aist 1, a small satellite
- AIST (missile), a Belarusian cruise missile

== See also ==
- AISTS, the International Academy of Sport Science and Technology
