= Air-launched cruise missile =

Type of military weapon

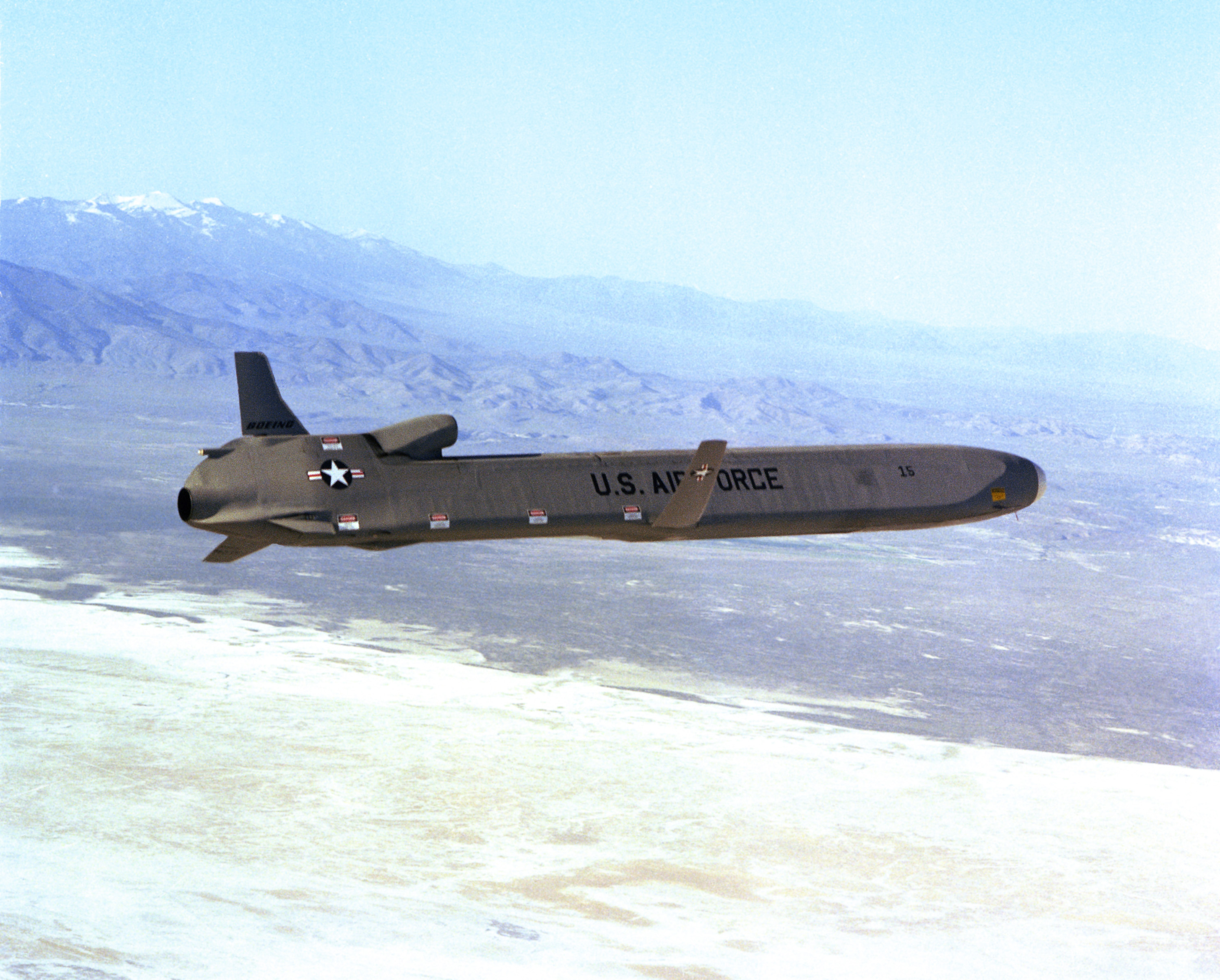
An AGM-86 air-launched cruise missile in flight (1980)

An air-launched cruise missile (ALCM) is a cruise missile that is launched from a military aircraft. Current versions are typically standoff weapons which are used to attack predetermined land and naval targets with conventional, nuclear or thermonuclear payloads.

== Examples ==
Specific types of ALCMs (current, past and under development) include:

- 3M-51 Alfa (Russia)
- 10Kh (USSR)
- AGM-28 Hound Dog (U.S.)
- AGM-84H/K SLAM-ER (U.S.)
- AGM-86 ALCM (U.S.)
- AGM-129 ACM (U.S.)
- AGM-158 JASSM (U.S.)
- AGM-158C LRASM (U.S.)
- AGM-181 LRSO (U.S.)
- Air-sol moyenne portée ASMP (France)
- AKF-98 (China)
- ASN4G (France)
- Blue Steel (UK)
- BrahMos (India/Russia)
- BrahMos-II (India/Russia)
- CATS Hunter (India)
- CJ-10 (China)
- Delilah (Israel)
- Hatf-VIII (Ra'ad) (Pakistan)
- Hypersonic Air Launched Offensive Anti-Surface (U.S.)
- Hypersonic Attack Cruise Missile (Australia/U.S.)
- Joint Strike Missile (Norway/U.S.)
- KaGeM V3 (Pakistan/Turkey)
- KALCM Cheonryong (South Korea)
- Kalibr-A (Russia)
- Kh-20 (USSR)
- Kh-22 (USSR/Russia)
- Kh-26 (USSR)
- Kh-32 (Russia)
- Kh-35 (Russia)
- Kh-55/Kh-555 (USSR/Russia)
- Kh-59 (USSR/Russia)
- Kh-61 (USSR/Russia)
- Kh-69 (Russia)
- Kh-101/102 (Russia)
- MICLA-BR (Brazil)
- Perseus (France/UK)
- Popeye (Israel)
- Ra'ad-II (Pakistan)
- Taimur (missile) (Pakistan)
- Taurus KEPD 350 (Germany/Sweden)
- Saber (UAE)
- Sea Breaker (Israel)
- SOM (Turkey)
- Storm Shadow/SCALP EG (France/UK)
- Wan Chien (Taiwan)
- Wind Demon (Israel)
- YJ-12 (China)

== See also ==
- Air-launched ballistic missile
- Air-to-surface missile
