= DF-100 =

- Type: Land-attack cruise missile
- Place of origin: China

Service history
- In service: 2019
- Used by: People's Liberation Army Rocket Force

Specifications
- Operational range: 3,000–4,000 kilometres (1,900–2,500 mi; 1,600–2,200 nmi)
- Maximum speed: Up to Mach 5 (6,100 km/h)
- Launch platform: Transporter erector launcher Aircraft

The CJ-100 (Chinese: 长剑-100; pinyin: Cháng Jiàn 100; lit. 'long sword 100')), military designation DF-100 (Chinese: 东风-100; pinyin: Dōngfēng 100; lit. 'East Wind 100'), NATO reporting name: CH-SSC-13 Splinter, is a Chinese land-attack cruise missile.

== History ==
According to the US Air Force's China Aerospace Studies Institute in 2020, at least one operational People's Liberation Army Rocket Force began receiving CJ-100s in 2019; full operational capability (FOC) was anticipated for 2022.

== Design ==
The CJ-100 is supersonic in nearly all flight phases. According to the International Institute for Strategic Studies in 2022, the missile has a range of 2,000 kilometres (1,200 mi; 1,100 nmi). In 2020, Ta Kung Pao reported the missile's accuracy as "meter-level".

According to Chinese reports, the missile may also be carried by the Xi'an H-6K bomber.

== Operators ==
China

- People's Liberation Army Rocket Force - Estimate 54 as of 2024

== See also ==
- CJ-10
- CJ-1000
- YJ-12
