= CJ-1000 (missile) =

Chinese cruise missile

- Type: Land-attack hypersonic cruise missile
- Place of origin: China

Service history
- Used by: People's Liberation Army Rocket Force

Specifications
- Engine: scramjet engine
- Operational range: 6,000 kilometres (3,700 mi; 3,200 nmi)
- Maximum speed: Up to Mach 6 (7,400 km/h)
- Launch platform: Transporter erector launcher

The CJ-1000 (Chinese: 长剑-1000; pinyin: Cháng Jiàn 1000; lit. 'long sword 1000') is a hypersonic land attack and anti-ship cruise missile powered by an air-breathing scramjet engine.

== Design ==
The CJ-1000 is a hypersonic cruise missile designed for long-range precision strike. The missile is likely based on the CJ-100 missile, previously seen on the 70th anniversary of the People's Republic of China in 2019. The missile reportedly is fitted with a scramjet engine, allowing maneuverable, sustained hypersonic flight within the atmosphere.

Chinese state media reported that the CJ-1000 is designed to engage "system-node targets on the ground, at sea or in the air", suggesting the missile is capable of targeting aircraft. The intended aerial targets for CJ-1000 are likely slow-moving, high-altitude, large aircraft such as aerial refuelers, airborne early warning and control (AEW&C) aircraft, and surveillance planes.

== Operators ==
- China
  - People's Liberation Army Rocket Force

== See also ==
- CJ-100
- YJ-19
- CJ-10
