= Wind Demon =

Israeli made long-range cruise missile

- Type: Air-launched cruise missile
- Place of origin: Israel

Service history
- In service: 2024–present
- Used by: Israel Defense Forces

Production history
- Designer: Israel Aerospace Industries
- Manufacturer: Israel Aerospace Industries
- Produced: 2024–
- Variants: Wind Demon, Sea Demon

Specifications
- Mass: 140 kg (310 lb)
- Warhead: Blast, fragmentation, or penetrative
- Warhead weight: > 20 kg (44 lb)
- Operational range: > 200 km (120 mi)
- Guidance system: Electro-Optical (EO), IIR, HD VIS, Semi-Active Laser Homing, ATR, Man-in-the-Loop
- Accuracy: Circular error probable: 1 m
- Launch platform: Helicopters, fixed-wing aircraft

Wind Demon is an Israeli long-range air-launched cruise missile developed by Israel Aerospace Industries (IAI). The missile is designed to neutralize a wide range of targets at long ranges with minimal resources. The cruise missile was first unveiled at the Farnborough Air Show on 22 July 2024.

An advanced missile equipped with an electro-optical homing warhead designed for high survivability, the Wind Demon is designed to meet the market demand for an effective and relatively inexpensive weapon for prolonged combat.

IAI markets a surface-to-surface variant for naval combat called Sea Demon.

== Tactical and technical characteristics ==
- Flight range: > 200 km
- Weight: 140 kg
- Warhead: Blast, fragmentation, or penetrative
- Warhead weight: > 20 kg
- Circular error probable : 1 m
- Guidance System: Electro-Optical (EO), IIR, HD VIS, Semi-Active Laser Homing, ATR and Man-in-the-Loop Control

== Description ==
The Wind Demon is launched from airborne platforms such as helicopters or fixed-wing aircraft and follows a predetermined mission plan to attack moving or stationary targets at ranges exceeding 200 kilometers. Flying at low altitudes, the Wind Demon avoids detection, disruption, and interception. The missile is capable of engaging both mobile and stationary targets.

Operators can select fast/slow/fast speed profiles that allow them to react to high speeds or approach points of interest at low speed, all designed for the element of surprise and evasiveness.
