= Popeye (missile) =

Family of Israeli air-to-surface missiles

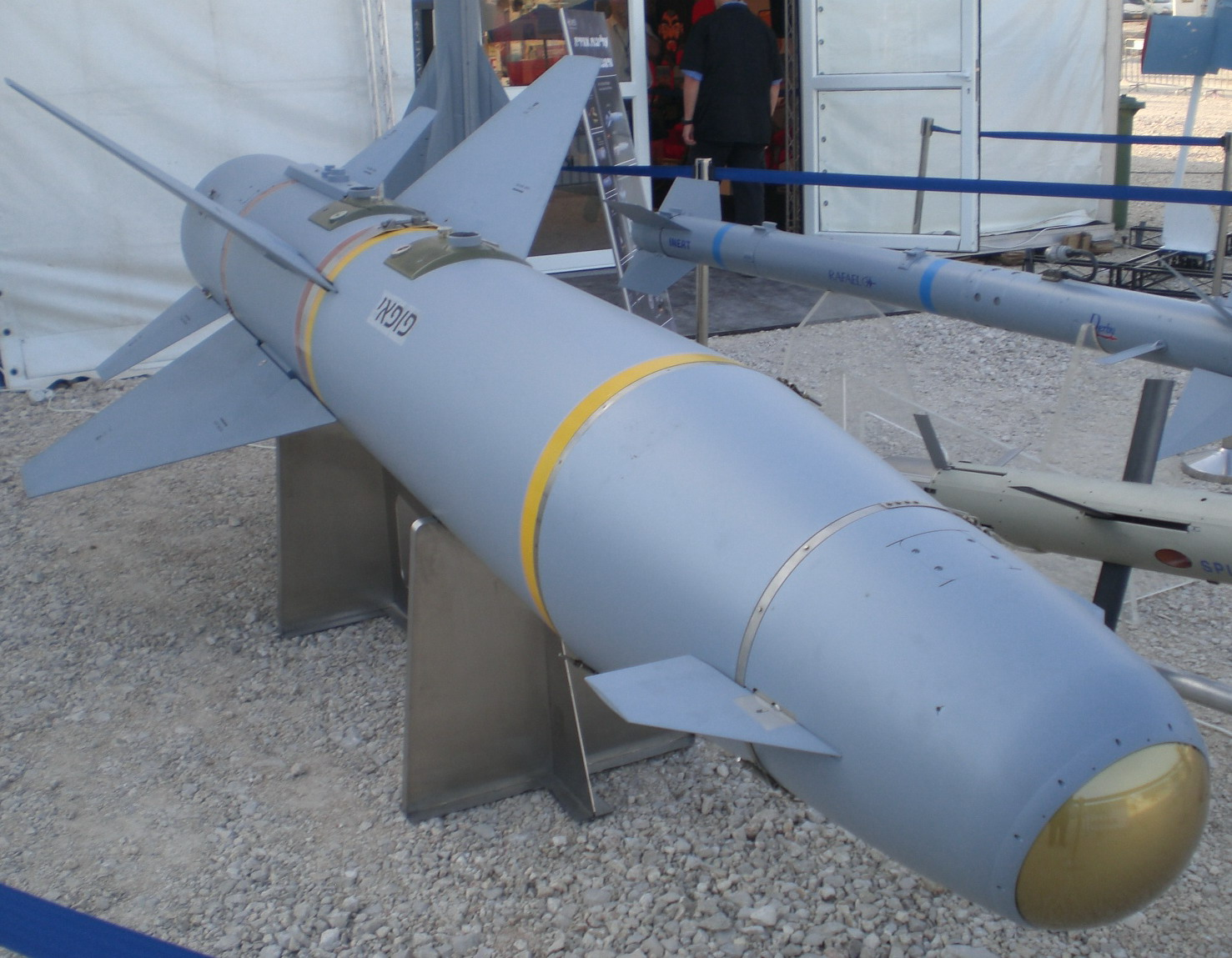
- The "Popeye" standoff missile
- Type: Air-to-surface missile SLCM
- Place of origin: Israel

Service history
- In service: 1985–present
- Used by: See Operators

Production history
- Designer: Rafael Advanced Defense Systems
- Manufacturer: Rafael Advanced Defense Systems; Lockheed Martin

Specifications
- Mass: 1,360 kg (3,000 lb)
- Length: 4.82 m (15 ft 10 in)
- Diameter: 533 mm (21.0 in)
- Wingspan: 198 cm (78 in)
- Warhead: 340 kg (750 lb) blast fragmentation or 360 kg (790 lb) I-800 penetrating
- Engine: Single-stage Solid-fuel rocket
- Operational range: 78 km (48 miles)
- Guidance system: Inertial plus IIR or TV
- Launch platform: Fixed-wing aircraft, Dolphin class submarine (Popeye Turbo SLCM)

The Popeye (Hebrew: פופאי) is a family of air-to-surface missiles developed and in use by Israel, of which several types have been developed for Israeli and export users. A long-range submarine-launched cruise missile variant of the Popeye Turbo has been speculated as being employed in Israel's submarine-based nuclear forces. The United States operated the Popeye under a different designation according to US naming conventions as the AGM-142 Have Nap.

== Design ==
The Popeye is designed for precision attack against large targets from stand off ranges. The standard Popeye and smaller Popeye-Lite are powered by a single-stage solid rocket. Rafael Advanced Defense Systems offered a Popeye Turbo air launched variant featuring a jet engine and folding wings for a UK competition specifying a cruise missile with range of at least 320 km (200 mi) in 1994; publicly exposing a lowest possible maximum range for that variant. An inertial guidance system pilots the missile towards the target; for terminal homing the pilot can control the missile directly via an INS and data link, aiming via either a television or imaging infrared seeker depending on the missile model. It is not necessary for the launching aircraft to direct the missile—control can be passed to another platform while the firing aircraft escapes the area. There are two choices of warhead for the export versions, a 340 kg (750 lb) blast/fragmentation or 360 kg (790 lb) penetrator.

The alleged Israeli submarine-launched cruise missile variant is reported to be jet powered and nuclear armed with a greatly increased range, though according to the Federation of American Scientists "open literature provides little information on this system" but in a May 2000 test launch was tracked for 1,500 km (930 mi).

=== Air launched variants ===
- Popeye (also known as Have Nap)— standard solid-rocket–powered stand off missile, 4.82 m (15 ft 10 in) long and weighing 1,360 kg (3,000 lb) with a 340 kg (750 lb) blast fragmentation or 360 kg (790 lb) I-800 penetrating warhead, inertial and imaging infrared or TV guidance.
- Popeye II or Popeye Lite (also known as Have Lite)— reduced size (shortened to 4.24 m [13 ft 11 in]) and weight version (weight is now 1,125 kg [2,480 lb]) of the Popeye to give light aircraft such as the F-16I Sufa a precision standoff strike capability.
- Popeye Turbo ALCM—The Popeye Turbo air-launched cruise missile, which uses a jet engine and liquid fuel, is approx 6.25 m (20 ft 6 in) long; it is reported to have a range of more than 320 km (200 mi).
- Crystal Maze or Raptor was developed in 2003–2004 to be lighter than Popeye for India, with a range of 100 km (62 mi), weighting 1,100 kg (2,400 lb) and carrying an 80 kg (180 lb) warhead.
- Crystal Maze II or ROCKS is an improved version of Crystal Maze with an enhanced range of 250 km (160 mi). The missile was first test launched in April 2024 from Sukhoi Su-30MKI under Andaman and Nicobar Command. The missile will be mass manufactured in India for Indian Air Force. The missile has the capability to target long range radars and air defence systems in GPS denied environments.
- Have Rain—A 2004 report indicated that Rafael was developing a new anti-ship version known as the “Have Rain.” The new missile is believed to have a launch weight of 900 kg (2,000 lb), for deployment aboard Lockheed P-3 Orion.
- Spice: In 2000, Rafael promoted a "Smart Precise Impact Cost Effective" (Spice) add-on "smart bomb" guidance kit for Mk 84 bombs, this system was based on the Popeye seekers.

== Popeye Turbo ==
The Popeye Turbo SLCM is a reportedly stretched version of the Popeye Turbo developed for use as a submarine-launched cruise missile (SLCM), which was widely reported—in a US Navy-observed 2002 test in the Indian Ocean—to have hit a target 1,500 km (930 mi) away. Some assume that the weapon's range has been extended to the point where it can launch against Tehran and even more Iranian cities from a relatively safe location. It can allegedly carry a 200 kiloton nuclear warhead. It is believed that the stretched Popeye Turbo is the primary strategic second strike nuclear deterrent weapon that can be fired from the 650 mm (26 in) secondary torpedo tubes of the Israeli Dolphin-class submarines. It is believed that the SLCM version of the Popeye was developed by Israel after the US Clinton administration refused an Israeli request in 2000 to purchase Tomahawk long range SLCM because of international MTCR proliferation rules. While the standard Popeye is 533 mm (21.0 in) the Dolphin class submarines have four 650 mm (26 in) torpedo tubes in addition to the six standard 533 mm (21.0 in) tubes allowing for the possibility that a SLCM Popeye derivative may be a larger diameter.

== Overview ==
The Popeye is compatible with a variety of aircraft from tactical fighters to heavy bombers.

Since their inception, the missiles have gone through a variety of improvement programs designed to increase reliability and reduce costs. These efforts have included changes in the materials and manufacturing processes of the wings, fins and rocket motor, new components in the inertial guidance unit, an upgraded processor, and an improved imaging infrared seeker.

Israel is thought to be using the airframe and avionics to produce a long-range submarine-launched cruise missile with a liquid-fueled jet engine similar to the Popeye Turbo rather than a rocket.

In US use, the Popeye designated as the AGM-142 Have Nap is intended primarily to equip the B-52H, allowing it to attack fixed targets of high value at sufficient range to provide protection from defences. The missile represented the first precision guided munition to be carried by the B-52H.

The London Sunday Times newspaper reported that on 5 July 2013, Israeli Dolphin submarines fired long-range cruise missiles at stores of Russian-made P-800 Oniks anti-ship missiles kept at the Syrian port of Latakia, contradicting an earlier CNN report it had been an air strike. Israel also deploys sub-Harpoon missiles capable of land attack on its Dolphin class submarines.

In the afternoon of 7 December 2014, two formations composed by two Israeli Air Force F-15Is each, fired Popeye missiles against two separate target sites in Syria. Syrian air defense Buk-M2 missile batteries fired two missiles at the incoming attack planes, both were jammed and two Pechora 2M missiles were hastily launched at the four incoming Popeye missiles, shooting one down.

In the early hours of 30 November 2016, Israeli planes launched air-to-surface Popeye missiles from Lebanese airspace at targets at Sabboura, north-east of Damascus.

In 19 December 2024, the IAF conducted airstrikes against the Houthis in Yemen targeting ports and energy infrastructure at Sanaa. Popeye missiles were carried on F-15s while the newer Rampage missiles were carried on F-16s.

=== Deployment ===
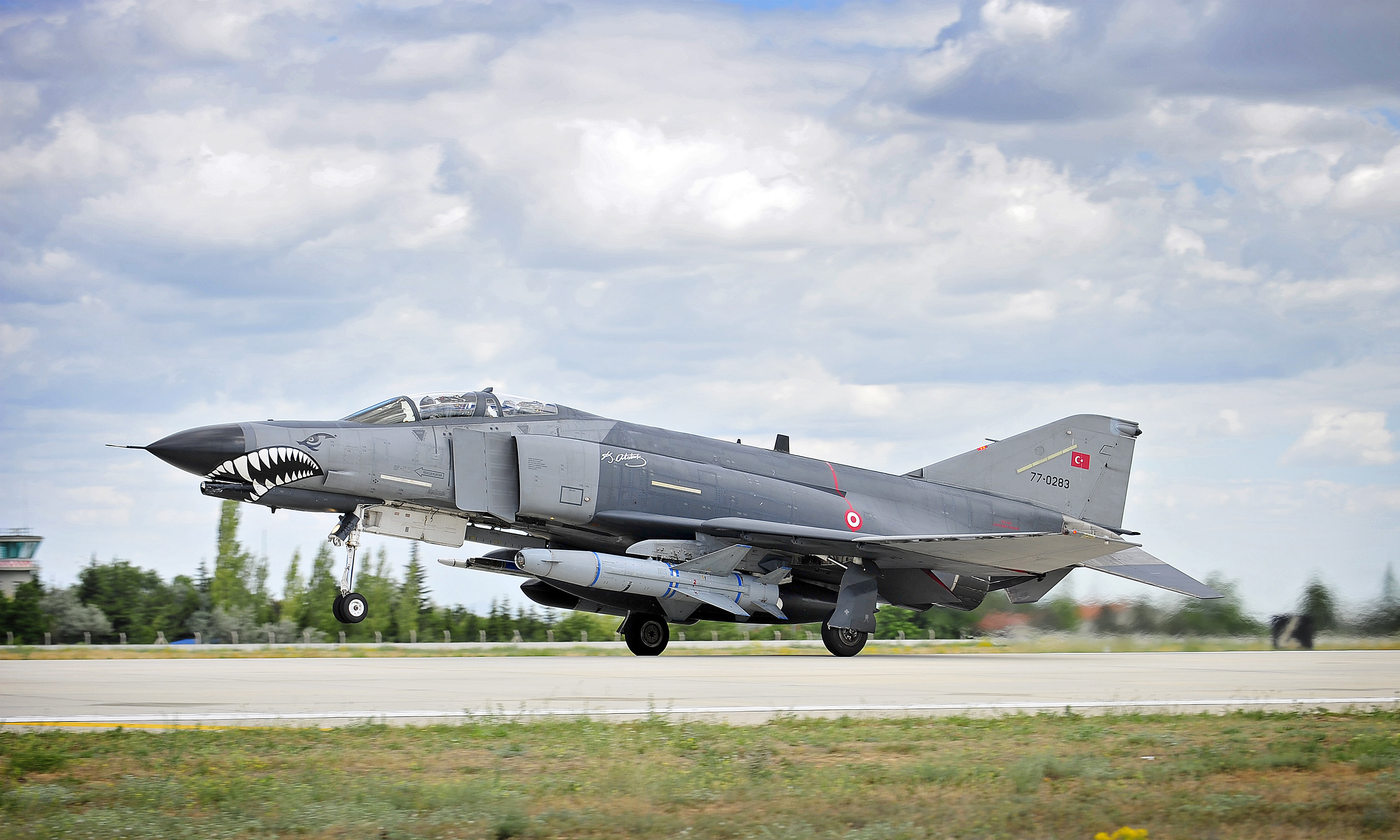
A Turkish Air Force F-4E Phantom II aircraft armed with Popeye missiles takes off from Third Air Force Base Konya, Turkey, during Exercise Anatolian Eagle.

First developed for use by the Israeli Air Force, it has been in service since 1985.

The United States Air Force first bought a batch of 154 missiles in 1989 followed by a second batch of 54 missiles in 1996.

The Royal Australian Air Force purchased a number of Popeye missiles in the late 1990s for use by the RAAF's F-111 bombers. The F-111 was taken out of Australian service in 2010. It proved difficult to integrate the missiles onto the F-111s and costs were much higher than expected.

Currently, the Turkish Air Force's F-4 2020 Terminator aircraft (which were extensively upgraded by IAI) and the TuAF F-16 CCIP are armed with a Turkish License production version of the Popeye.

=== Israel and Turkey co-production ===
In May 1997, Israel and Turkey signed an agreement valued in excess of US$500 million for the establishment of a joint-venture between Israel's Rafael and Turkey's Turkish Aerospace Industries for the co-production of Popeye I and Popeye II missiles in Turkey.

== Operators ==
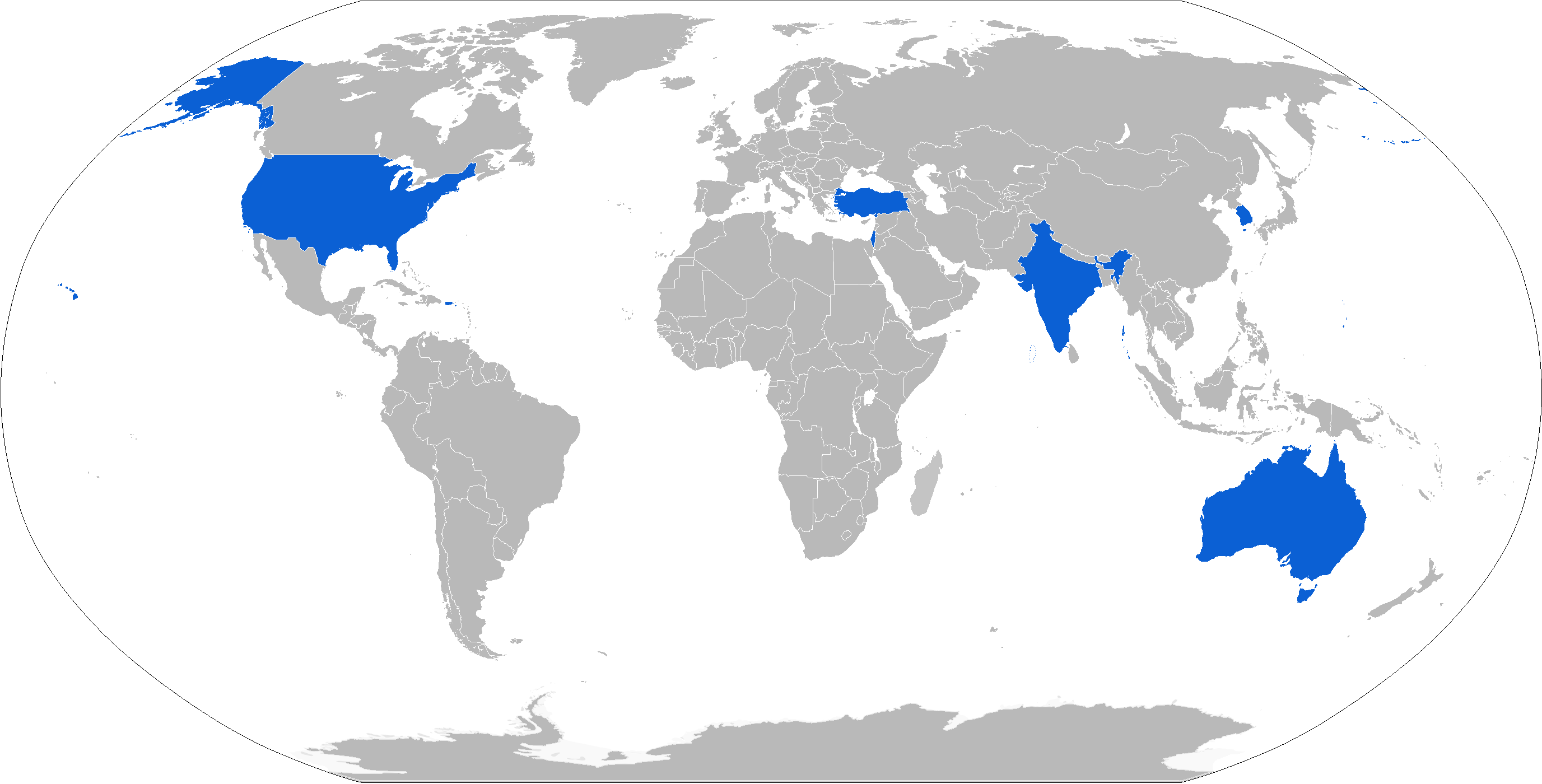
Map with Popeye operators in blue

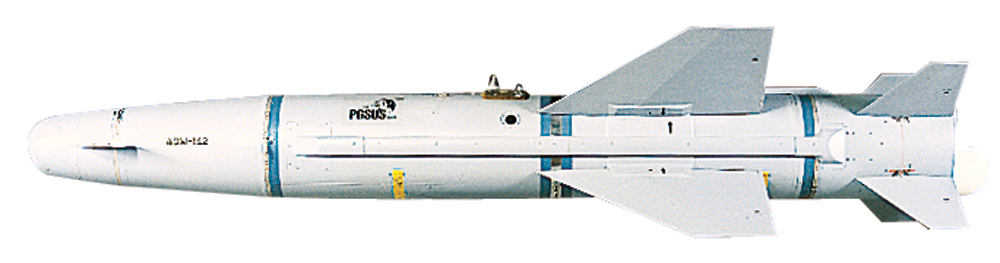
Popeye Standoff Missile

There have been reports that Israel has exported Popeye and its variants to various countries:

- Australia: Royal Australian Air Force
- India: 30 for Indian Air Force
- Israel: Israeli Air Force, Israeli Navy
- South Korea: Republic of Korea Air Force (retired in 2024), produced in the United States jointly by Rafael and Lockheed Martin.
- Turkey: Turkish Air Force
- United States: United States Air Force (retired in 2004)

== Specifications ==
- Weight : 1,360 kg (3,000 lb)
- Length: 4.82 m (15 ft 10 in)
- Diameter: 533 mm (21.0 in)
- Wingspan: 1.98 m (6 ft 6 in)
- Guidance: Inertial plus imaging infrared or TV
- Engine: Single-stage solid rocket
- Range: 78 km (48 mi)
- Warhead: 340 kg (750 lb) blast fragmentation, or 360 kg (790 lb) I-800 penetrating

== See also ==
- Delilah (missile) – (Israel)
- BrahMos – (India, Russia)
- Ra'ad – (Pakistan)
- Ra'ad-II – (Pakistan)
- Roketsan SOM – (Turkey)
- Bina – (Iran)
- Ya-Ali – (Iran)
- Ghassed-3 – (Iran)
- Zoobin – (Iran)
- Sadid-1 – (Iran)
- Jask-2 – (Iran)
