= Ra'ad-II =

Pakistani air-launched cruise missile

- Type: ALCM
- Place of origin: Pakistan

Service history
- In service: 2020–Present
- Used by: Pakistan Air Force: Air Force Strategic Command

Production history
- Designer: National Engineering & Scientific Commission (Guidance/controls); Air Weapons Complex (Warhead design/assembly)
- Designed: 2007–2019
- Manufacturer: Air Weapons Complex
- Developed into: Taimoor

Specifications (Technical data)
- Mass: ≤1,100 kg (2,400 lb)
- Length: 4.85 m (15.9 ft)
- Diameter: 0.50 m (20 in)
- Maximum firing range: 650 km (400 mi)
- Warhead: ICM/HE/NE
- Warhead weight: 450 kg (990 lb)
- Blast yield: 5 kilotons of TNT (21 TJ)—12 kilotons of TNT (50 TJ)
- Engine: Turbojet
- Payload capacity: ≤450 kg (990 lb)
- Operational range: 600 km (370 mi)
- Flight altitude: Terrain-following
- Maximum speed: ≤0.8 Mach. (980 km/h (610 mph))
- Guidance system: Inertial, Terminal
- Accuracy: 3.0 m (9.8 ft) CEP
- Launch platform: JF-17A/B, Mirage-IIIR, Mirage-VR
- Transport: Combat aircraft

The Ra'ad-II (Urdu: رعد-۲ 'Thunder-2') is a standoff and an air-launched cruise missile (ALCM) derived from the Hatf-VIII Ra'ad. It was first publicly unveiled on the Pakistan Day Parade on 23 March 2017,

The Ra'ad features extended range, changes in its control mechanism, its guidance and enhanced flight control systems.

== Testing and unveiling ==
On 18 February 2020, Ra'ad-II was test-fired from the Pakistan Air Force's Mirage-IIIR platform. The test was overseen by Ra'ad-II program manager, the Strategic Plans Division, developing contractor, NESCOM, and the Pakistan Air Force and Army's Strategic Commands.

According to the ISPR, it significantly enhanced Pakistan's air delivered strategic standoff capability on land and at sea.

== Technical design ==
Data provided by the Inter-Services Public Relations, the Ra'ad-II has an extended range of 600 km (370 mi) and has a conventional tail fin configuration compared to the twin tail configuration of the previous version.

It has a new "X" type tail as opposed to previous versions large horizontal tails. It has a length of 4.85 m (15.9 ft), and is much lighter than the previous weapon system. Design and control surfaces changes to Ra'ad-II allows to integrate with the JF-17 Thunder platform— the PAF's primary strike platform.

=== Aerial-based deterrence ===
Both Hatf-VIII Ra'ad and Ra'ad-II are seen as providing Pakistan the aerial nuclear deterrence against the much larger Indian Air Force and their air defenses in an event of large scale conventional war.

In an interview of one former PAF's former fighter pilot, the pilot stated that the Ra'ad "treetop-hugging [ALCM] with its minuscule radar cross-section should be a good antidote to the Indian acquired of S-400 Triumf." While the Islamabad-based Center for International Strategic Studies (CISS) analyst maintained that the Ra’ad-II is "Pakistan's response to Indian development of the Nirbhay cruise missile."

== Similar missiles ==
- AGM-158 JASSM – (United States)
- CJ-10 – (China)
- KEPD 350 – (Sweden, Germany)
- Kh-65SE – (Soviet Union)
- SOM – (Turkey)
- Saber – (United Arab Emirates)
- Storm Shadow – (France, United Kingdom)
- Taimoor – (Pakistan)
