= Submarine-launched cruise missile =

Seaborne weapon

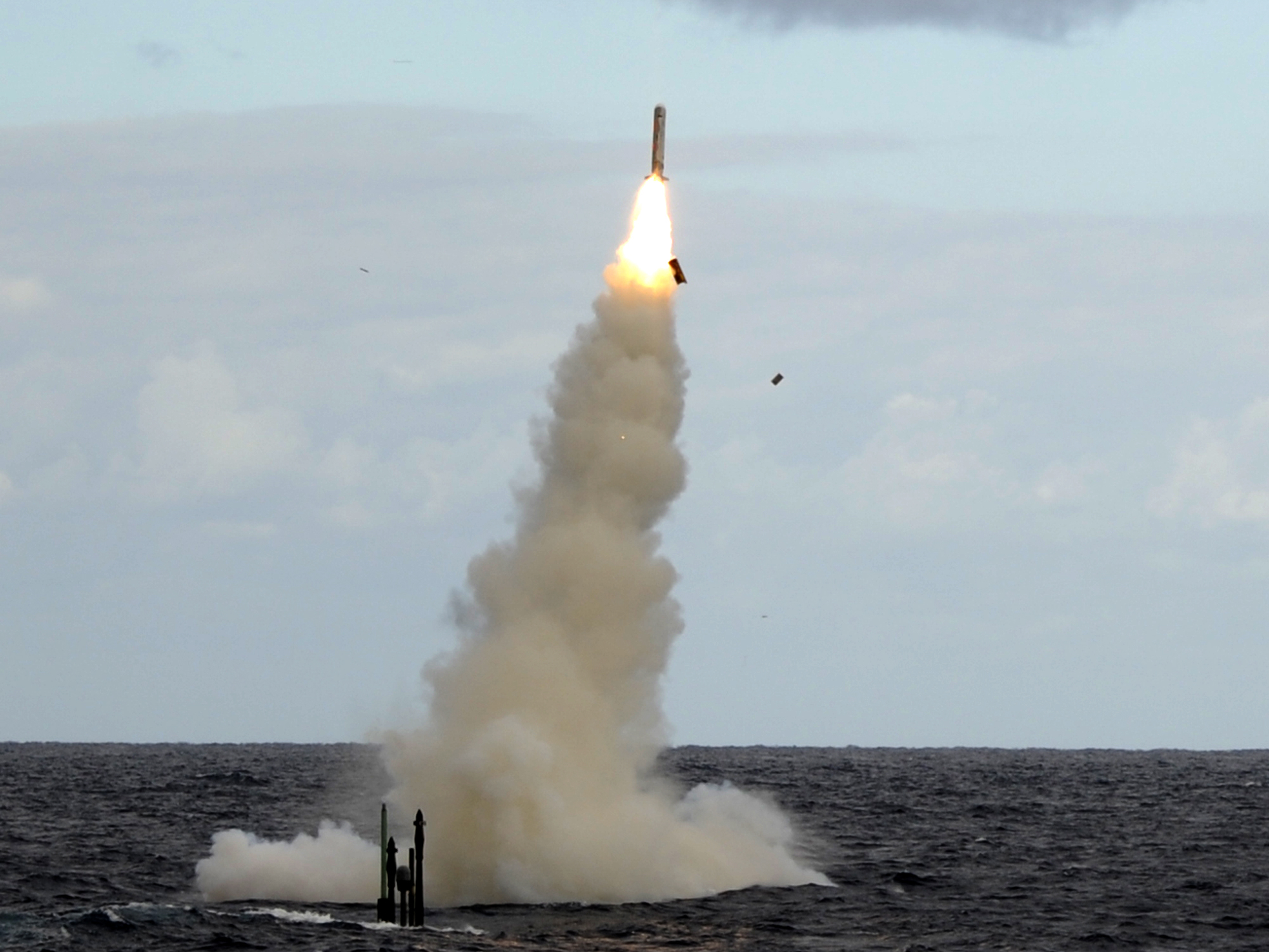
HMS Astute launching a Tomahawk in 2011

A submarine-launched cruise missile (SLCM) is a cruise missile that is launched from a submarine (especially a SSG or SSGN). Current versions are typically standoff weapons known as land-attack cruise missiles (LACMs), which are used to attack predetermined land targets with conventional or nuclear payloads. Anti-ship cruise missiles (ASCMs) are also used, and some submarine-launched cruise missiles have variants for both functions.

== History of development ==
The U.S. Navy's first land-attack cruise missile submarines (4 SSG and 1 SSGN) deployed with the Regulus missile from 1958 until they were retired in 1964 with the arrival of the Polaris ballistic missile submarines (SSBNs) in the Pacific. The US deployed the short-range Harpoon anti-ship missile on submarines beginning in 1981. The Soviet Navy converted 13 Whiskey-class submarines (Project 613) for the land-attack cruise missile (LACM) role in the late 1950s (Whiskey Single Cylinder, Whiskey Twin Cylinder, Whiskey Long Bin), armed with the SS-N-3 Shaddock (П-5) missile.

As Soviet SSBNs armed with submarine-launched ballistic missiles (SLBM) became available in the late 1960s, the Shaddock LACM was withdrawn and an anti-ship (ASCM) version replaced it. The Echo- and Juliett-class submarines of the 1960s had a similar armament history, with the Echo Is converted to attack submarines because they could not accommodate an anti-ship guidance radar. The SS-N-3 ASCM was eventually replaced with the SS-N-12 (P-500). Later, the Charlie and Oscar classes were designed to use long-range ASCMs, the SS-N-9 (P-120) and SS-N-19 (P-700) respectively. Only the Oscar class remains in service. In 1990, it was reported that the Soviet Navy had deployed between 50 and 300 SLCMs. The current Akula- and Severodvinsk-class submarines are armed with the SS-N-21 (S-10) LACM.

Four U.S. Navy Ohio-class SSBNs were converted in the mid-2000s to be able to salvo launch up to 144 Tomahawk cruise missiles from their modified vertical launch SLBM tubes, as opposed to launching cruise missiles from torpedo tubes as is done from attack submarines. The advantage that the submarines have over guided-missile destroyers and cruisers is the ability to remain undetected and launch while submerged. Tomahawk was deployed on US Navy attack submarines beginning in 1983, originally in LACM and ASCM versions, but the ASCM version was withdrawn in the 1990s.

The USSR's S-10 Granat subsonic cruise missiles designed by the NPO Novator may still be in service in Russia, albeit not deployed. In October 2015, Russia launched long-range Kalibr (Klub) cruise missiles from its small ships in the Caspian Sea on targets in Syria; in December, several 3M14K cruise missiles from Kalibr-PL system were fired from the improved Kilo-class submarine B-237 Rostov-on-Don in the Mediterranean. The deployment of Kalibr missiles, long-range, low-flying, capable of carrying conventional or nuclear warheads, available in land-attack, anti-ship and anti-submarine variants, was said to have altered the military balance in Europe and potentially compromised the NATO missile defence system under construction in Europe.

Jane's Defence Weekly reports that the Dolphin-class submarines are believed to be nuclear armed, offering Israel a sea-based, second strike capability. In adherence to Missile Technology Control Regime rules the US Clinton administration refused an Israeli request in 2000 to purchase Tomahawk long range SLCMs. The Federation of American Scientists and GlobalSecurity.org report that the four larger torpedo tubes are capable of launching Israeli built nuclear-armed Popeye Turbo cruise missiles

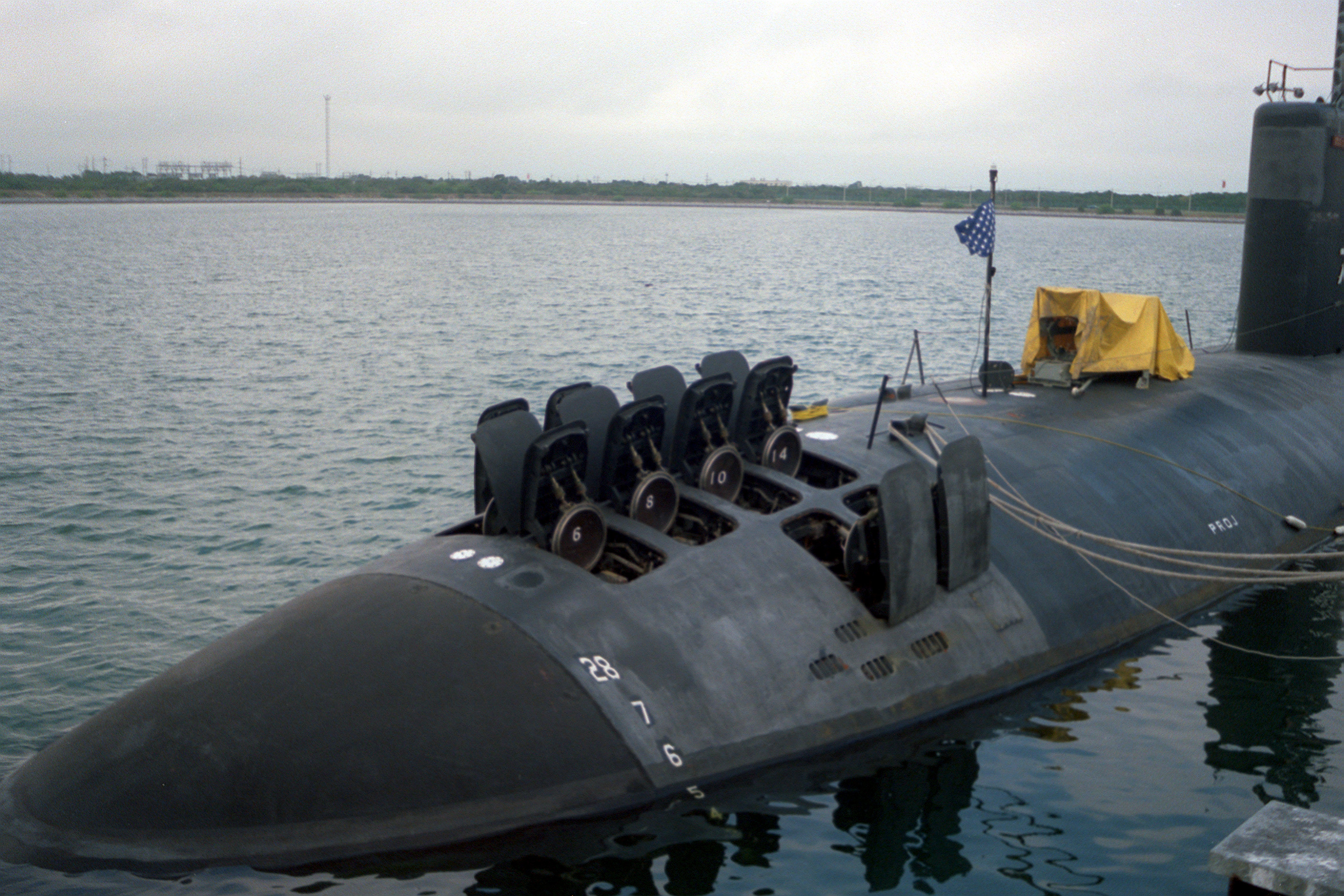
The fore section of USS Santa Fe, a Los Angeles-class submarine with the doors of the vertical launching system for Tomahawk missiles in the open position. The method of firing from VLS is in the minority.

== See also ==
- Submarine-launched missile
- Submarine-launched ballistic missile

== Bibliography ==
- Gardiner and Chumbley, Conway's All the World's Fighting Ships 1947–1995, Conway Maritime Press, 1995, ISBN 1-55750-132-7
