= Hypersonic Air Launched Offensive Anti-Surface =

Hypersonic Air Launched Offensive Anti-Surface (HALO)
- Type: Hypersonic air-launched anti-ship missile
- Place of origin: United States

Service history
- In service: Cancelled
- Used by: United States Navy

Production history
- Designer: Raytheon Missiles & Defense; Lockheed Martin

Specifications
- Launch platform: F/A-18E/F Super Hornet

The Hypersonic Air Launched Offensive Anti-Surface (HALO) was a hypersonic air-launched anti-ship missile being developed for the United States Navy. It was designed to provide greater anti-surface warfare capability than the AGM-158C LRASM and was expected to be compatible with F/A-18E/F Super Hornet. The initial operational capability was expected in 2028. The program was also called the Offensive Anti-Surface Warfare Increment 2 (OASuW Inc 2) program.

On 28 March 2023, Naval Air Systems Command (NAVAIR) awarded a $116 million contract to Raytheon Missiles & Defense and Lockheed Martin for technical maturation and development through a preliminary design review of the propulsion system. The contract was slated to begin in December 2024, with each company's initial design review working towards a prototype flight test.

However, at the Navy League's Sea-Air-Space conference's April 2023, Rear Admiral Stephen Tedford, Program Executive Officer for unmanned aviation and strike weapons at NAVAIR, said that HALO might be "a little bit of a misnomer" because it might not reach hypersonic speeds. Tedford said that HALO may reach only supersonic speeds, (high Mach 4-plus) rather than hypersonic speeds (over Mach 5).

On April 10, 2025, the United States Navy cancelled the program in favor of pursuing the current Offensive Anti-Surface Warfare Increment 1 (OASuW Inc 1), which utilizes the LRASM.

== See also ==
- Hypersonic Attack Cruise Missile – (United States, Australia)
- 3M22 Zircon – (Russia)
- Multi-mission Affordable Capacity Effector – (United States)
