= Wan Chien =

Taiwanese air-launched cruise missile

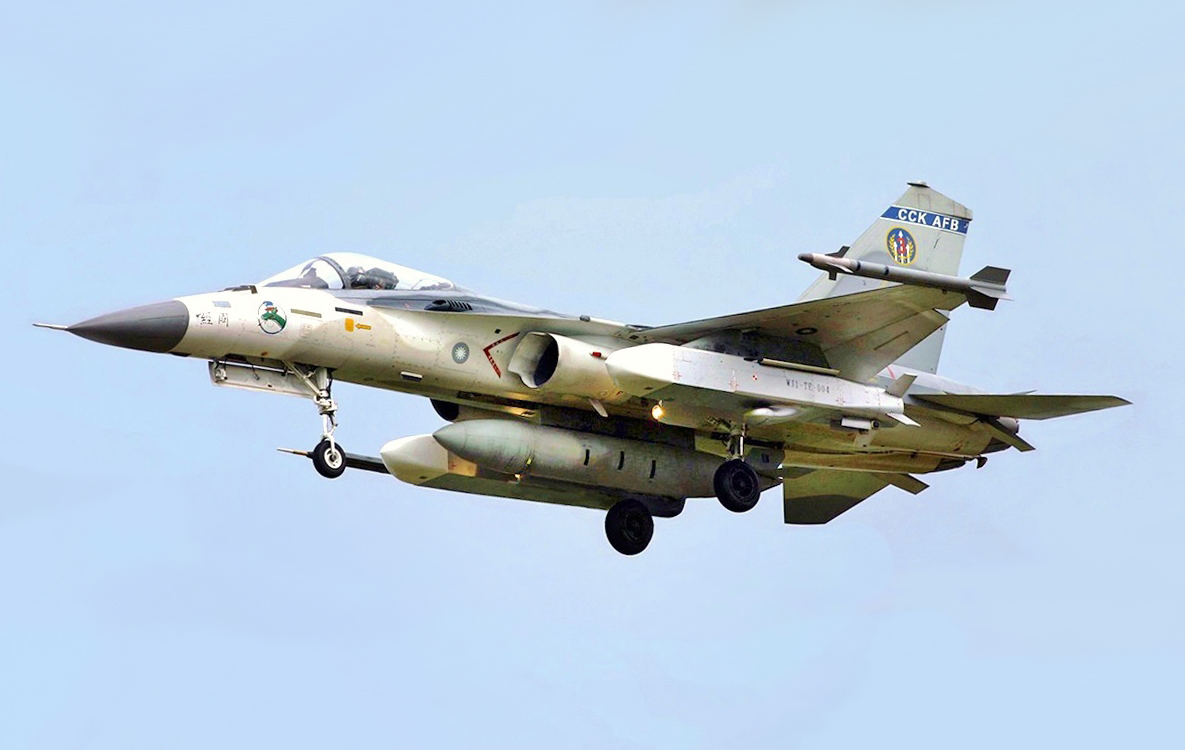
- IDF with Wan Chien
- Type: Air-launched cruise missile Air-to-ground missile
- Place of origin: Taiwan

Service history
- In service: 2011 – present
- Used by: Republic of China Air Force

Production history
- Manufacturer: National Chung-Shan Institute of Science and Technology

Specifications
- Mass: 650 kg (1,433 lb)
- Length: 350 cm (138 in)
- Diameter: 610 mm (24 in)
- Wingspan: 1,500 mm (59 in)
- Warhead: 350kg of submunitions
- Engine: Turbofan
- Operational range: 240 km (130 nmi); 400 km (220 nmi) (Upgraded version)
- Maximum speed: subsonic
- Guidance system: GPS and inertial guidance

The Wan Chien (Chinese: 萬劍; pinyin: Wànjiàn; Wade–Giles: Wan^{4}-chien^{4}; Tâi-lô: Bān-kiàm; lit. 'ten thousand swords') is an air to ground cruise missile developed and produced by the National Chung-Shan Institute of Science and Technology (NCSIST) of Taiwan.

== Design and development ==
It partly resembles the AGM-154 Joint Standoff Weapon and the Storm Shadow. Serial production was expected to start in 2015. Full operational capability was declared in 2018. It is functional in both a ground strike role and a naval strike role. The codename for the development and initial production of the Wan Chien was "Project God’s Axe" (神斧).

After the completion of initial production NCSIST began working on a long range variant with a 400km range.

== Service history ==
The Wan Chien entered service in 2011. The primary launch platform is the AIDC F-CK-1 C/D.

In 2022 annual production was approximately 50 missiles a year. Production was expected to end in 2024 but in 2023 funds were allocated to extend production of the improved version through 2028.

== General characteristics ==
- Platform: Aircraft launched
- Engine: Turbine
- Range: 200 km, 240 km
- Guidance: GPS enabled

== See also ==
- Hsiung Feng II – (Taiwan)
- AGM-158 JASSM – (United States)
- Storm Shadow – (France, United Kingdom)
- Taurus KEPD 350 – (Sweden, Germany)
- Ra'ad – (Pakistan)
