= AIST (missile) =

- Type: Long-range, all-weather, subsonic cruise missile
- Place of origin: Belarus

Service history
- In service: unknown
- Used by: Belarus Army

Production history
- Manufacturer: GVPK (initially)

Specifications
- Mass: 1500 kg
- Length: 1100 mm
- Height: 455 mm
- Diameter: 0,57 m
- Wingspan: 8 ft 9 in (2.67 m)
- Engine: MS-400 turbofan engine
- Maximum speed: Subsonic; up to 900 km/h

AIST cruise missile - latest development of the Belarusian State Military Industrial Committee. The cruise missile is a high precision short-range subsonic cruise missile developed in close cooperation with Ukrainian and Chinese experts.

== Overview ==
The likeliest missile launcher for the cruise missile Aist is supposed to be the universal multiple launch rocket system (MLRS) Polonez, based on a wheeled chassis MZKT-7930 Astrolog.

Vehicles of this type are widely used as a platform for a number of weapon systems, mainly those produced in Russia. Belarusian 4x4 wheeled chassis, in particular, are used as a platform for the Russian Iskander short-range ballistic missile system and the Pakistani Hatf VII Babur cruise missile.

The ground chassis will comprise all the necessary components of a combat and launcher-loader vehicle. Each combat vehicle will mount two or three missiles.

Aist cruise missile is equipped with a turbofan engine for subsonic cruise missiles and unmanned aerial vehicles MS-400 produced by the Ukrainian enterprise Motor Sich. The Chinese DF-10 (CJ-10) cruise missile as well as the Pakistani Hatf VII Babur cruise missile are also equipped with this type of engine.

== Specifications (with MS-400 turbofan engine) ==
- maximum cruise thrust – 400 kgf;
- fuel consumption – up to 0.8 kg/kgf;
- diameter – 320 mm;
- length (with extended exhaust line) – 1100 mm;
- height (including engine mount components) – 455 mm;
- gross empty mass – 85 kg.
- gross launching mass – about 1500 kg;
- combat load – 350 kg; length – 6 m;
- diameter – 0,57 m; wingspan – 2,7 m;
- range – 500 km; missile velocity – up to 900 km/h.
