= Delilah (missile) =

Delilah missile
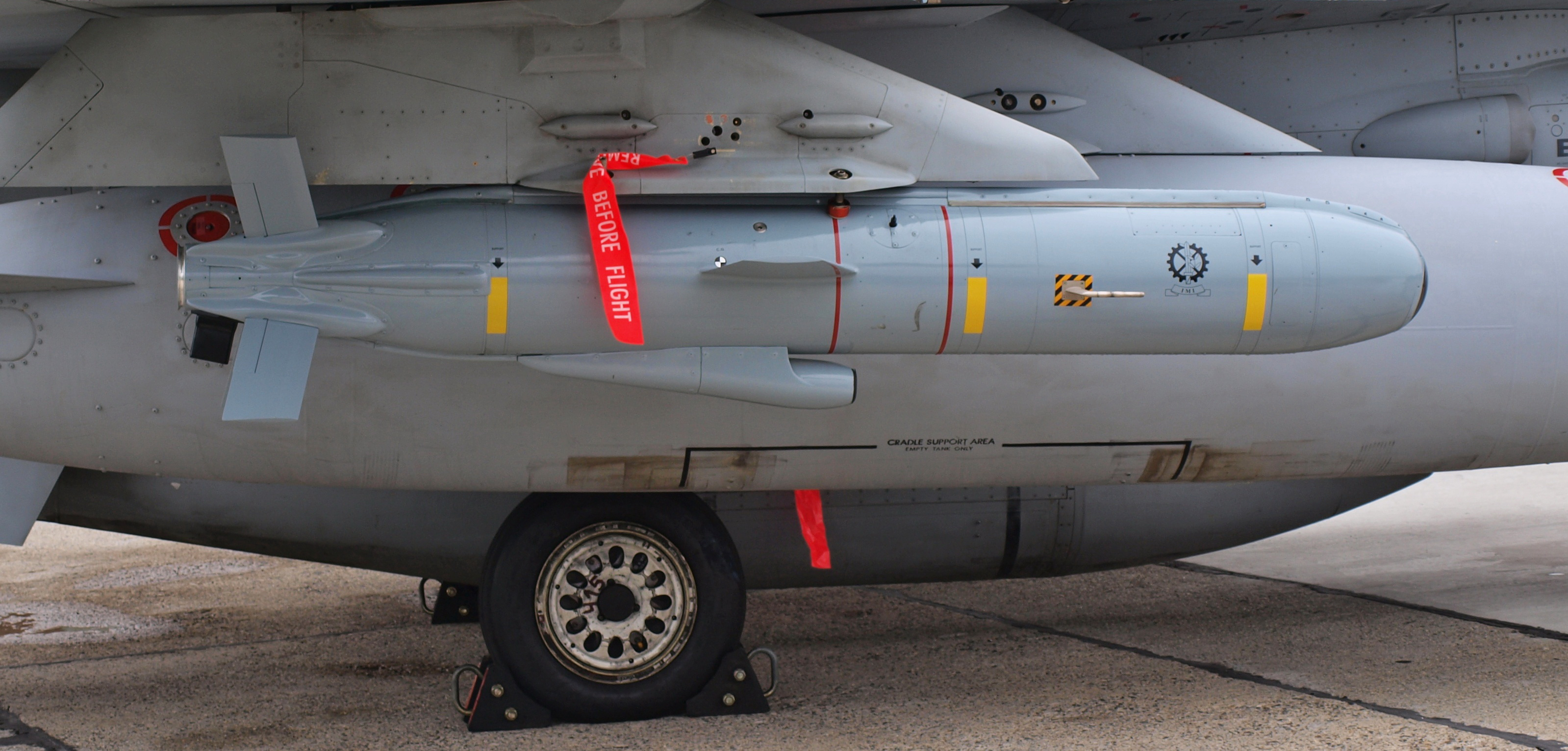
- Type: Air-launched cruise missile / loitering munition
- Place of origin: Israel

Service history
- In service: 1980s (initial versions, limited use), fully operational 1995-present
- Used by: See users
- Wars: Syrian Civil War; 2026 Iran war

Production history
- Manufacturer: Israel Military Industries

Specifications
- Mass: 187 kilograms (412 lb)
- Length: 2.71 metres (8 ft 11 in)
- Diameter: 0.33 metres (1 ft 1 in)
- Wingspan: 1.15 metres (3 ft 9 in)
- Warhead weight: 30 kilograms (66 lb)
- Operational range: 250 kilometres (160 mi)
- Flight altitude: 28,000 feet (8,500 m)
- Maximum speed: Mach 0.3-0.7 (Dive: Mach 0.85)
- Guidance system: CCD\IIR with GPS\INS
- Accuracy: 1 metre (3 ft 3 in) CEP
- Launch platform: aircraft, helicopter, ground launcher, sea launcher

The Delilah missile is a cruise missile or loitering munition developed in Israel by Israel Military Industries (IMI). It is designed to target moving and re-locatable targets with a circular error probable (CEP) of 1 metre (3 ft 3 in). Unlike a typical cruise missile, which is locked onto a pre-programmed target prior to launch, the Delilah missile's unique feature, as claimed by the manufacturer, is being able to loiter and surveil an area before a remote weapon systems officer, usually from the launching fighter aircraft, identifies the specific target of the attack.

== Overview ==
The name Delilah had been used by an anti-radiation attack drone configured after the US MQM-74 Chukar aerial target. It entered service in the Israeli Air Force in the mid-1980s. This air-launched drone identifies radar sites, allowing them to be found and destroyed. The Delilah missile is the name of a missile family built by IMI. Delilah was initially created as an aerial decoy, and was later developed into an offensive strike weapon in the 1990s, used by Israeli F-16 and upgraded F-4E attack aircraft. It is multi-platform and has multi-target capability. Its uses include Air-to-Surface (AS) and Surface-to-Surface (SS), targeting ground targets, vehicles and sea vessels, either stationary or moving. It is classed as a Medium Range, Multi-Purpose Guided Missile (MRMPGM), as All-in-One.

The Delilah is an air-launched stand-off missile and cruise missile with a range of 250 km. It can be fitted with a variety of warheads which can be targeted on both land and sea targets. It has a turbo jet engine that is able to loiter, allowing it to target well-hidden threats in addition to moving targets. Its maneuverability makes the missile ideal for destroying surface-to-air missile threats. The on-board autopilot and inertial navigation/global positioning navigation systems (INS/GPS) allow the missile to perform its mission autonomously. A data link enables intervention and target validation. The Delilah missile was first used in combat by Israel over Lebanon in July and August 2006 and launched by F-16D fighter aircraft. The missile can be fired from most aircraft, helicopters, or ground launchers. Its compact dimensions allow it to be carried by the Sikorsky UH-60 Black Hawk and SH-60B helicopters.

== Delilah-GL missile ==
The Delilah-GL is a ground-launched version of the Delilah cruise missile that has a range of 250 km. It is equipped with a 30 kg conventional explosive warhead. It can be modified to carry other payloads, such as infrared target seeking and guidance devices. It is guided by GPS and has the ability to loiter in the target area, before confirming the target through real-time visual intelligence.

== Operational history ==
On 10 May 2018, Delilah missiles were fired at Syrian and Iranian targets, including multiple anti-aircraft systems, such as SA-5, SA-22 and SA-2 units.

Delilah missiles were used by Israel in combat in the 2026 Iran war.

== Operators ==
=== Current operator ===
- Israel
