= Saber (cruise missile) =

Emirati air-launched cruise missile

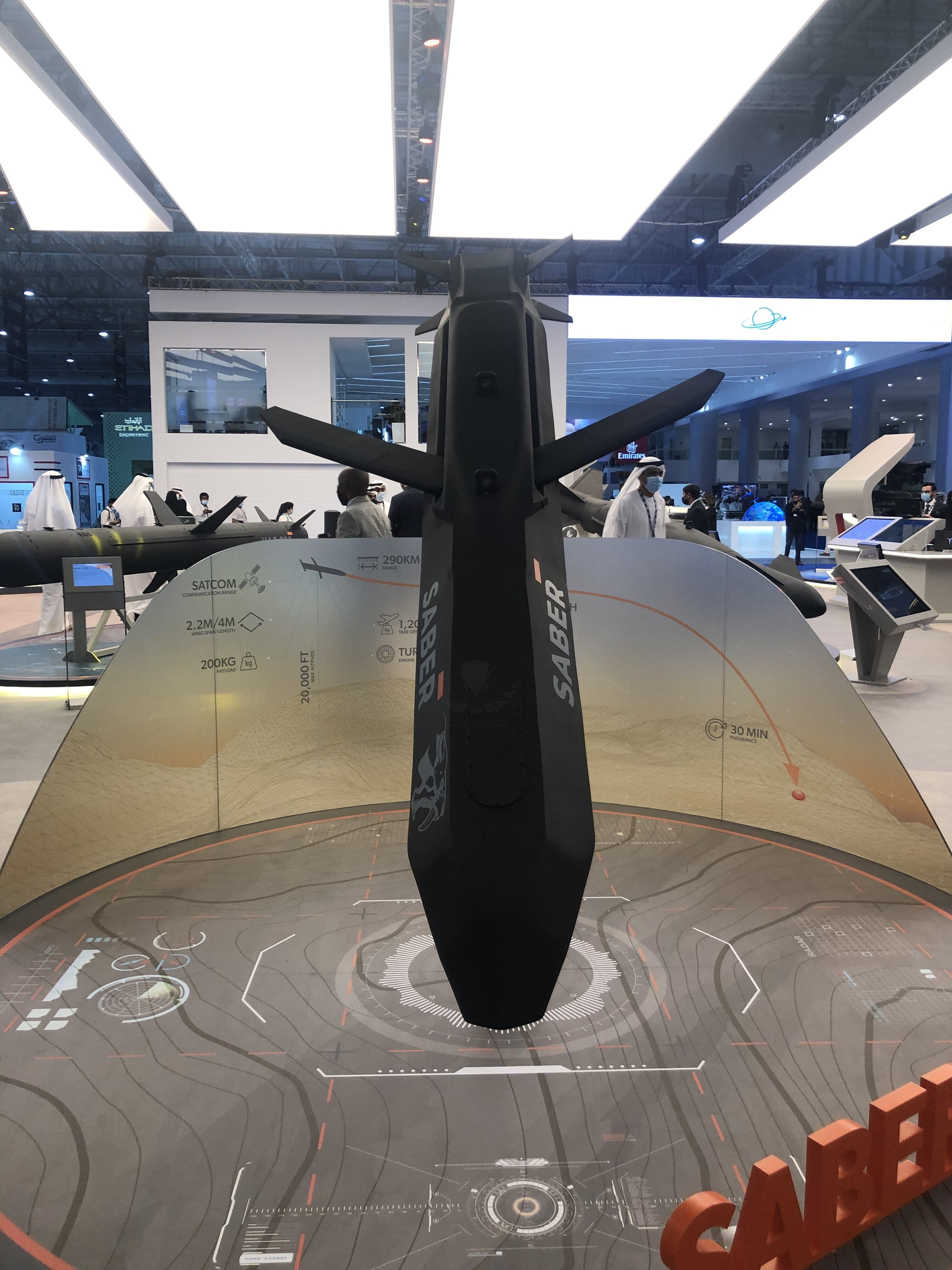
- Type: Air-launched cruise missile
- Place of origin: United Arab Emirates

Production history
- Designer: Halcon Systems
- Manufacturer: Halcon Systems

Specifications
- Mass: 1,200 kg (2,600 lb)
- Length: 4 m (13 ft)
- Wingspan: 2.2 m (7 ft 3 in)
- Warhead: 450 kg (990 lb)
- Engine: Turbo Fan 400
- Operational range: exporting range 290 km (180 mi), actual range 493 km (306 mi)
- Guidance system: Global Positioning System, TERCOM, inertial navigation system (INS)

The Saber is an Emirati low-observable, long-range air-launched cruise missile developed by Halcon Systems for United Arab Emirates Air force.
