= KAI KF-21 Boramae =

South Korean fighter aircraft

KF-21 Boramae
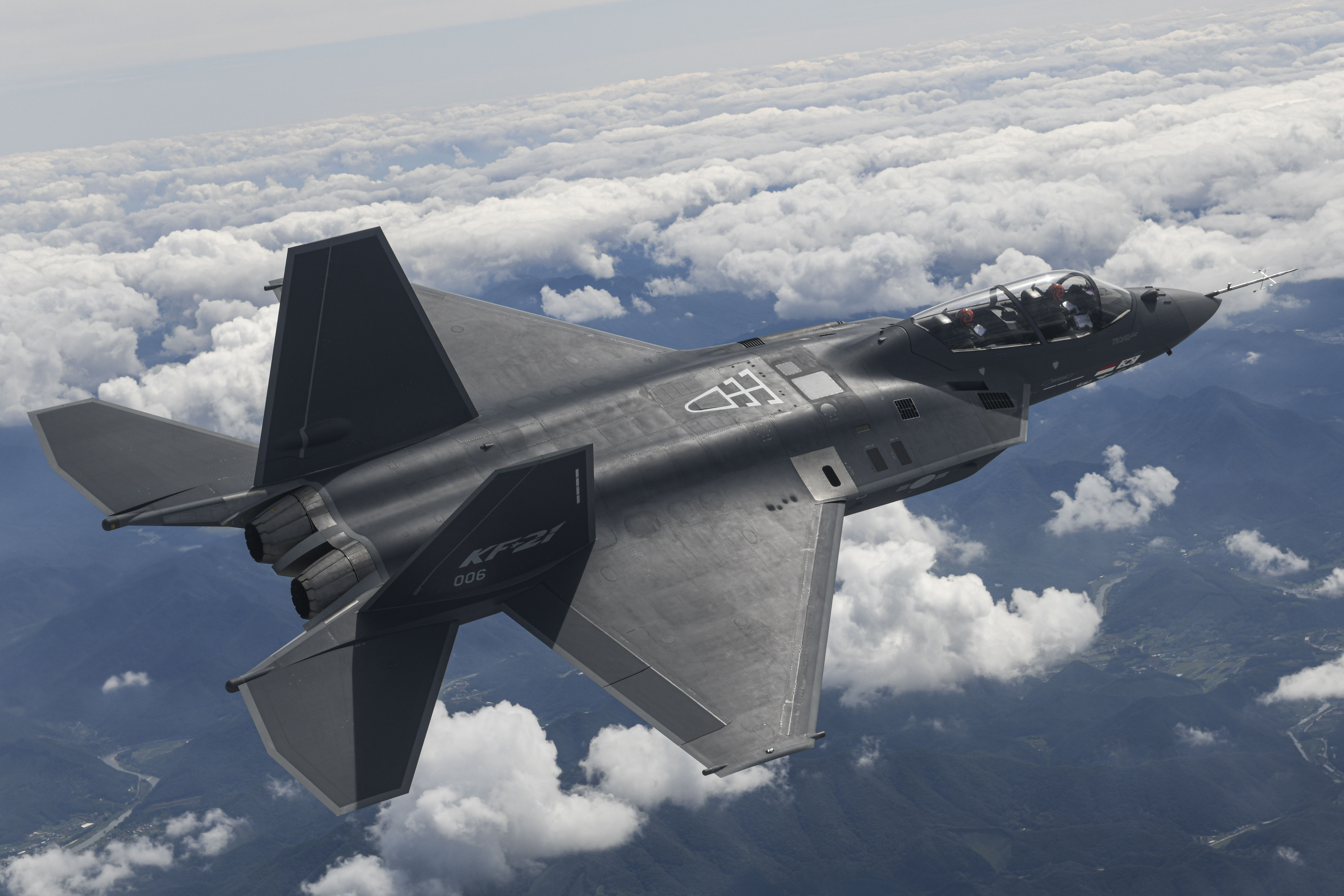

General information
- Type: Block 1: Air superiority fighter Block 2: Multirole combat aircraft Block 3: Stealth multirole combat aircraft
- National origin: South Korea
- Manufacturer: Korea Aerospace Industries
- Designer: Agency for Defense Development
- Status: In service
- Primary user: Republic of Korea Air Force
- Number built: KAI: 6 prototypes ROKAF: 2 (40 orders)

History
- Manufactured: 2024–present
- Introduction date: 22 September 2026
- First flight: 19 July 2022

The KAI KF-21 Boramae (Korean: KF-21 보라매; lit. 'KF-21 Hunting Hawk'; formerly KF-X; commonly KF-21) is a South Korean twin-engine fighter aircraft. The initial goal of the program was to develop an indigenous multirole fighter for the Republic of Korea Air Force (ROKAF). The airframe of Blocks I and II adopts semi-stealth technology with partially embedded external weapons and MUM-T (Manned-Unmanned Teaming) capabilities, while full stealth, including internal weapons bays is planned for the Block III or KF-21EX variant. As South Korea's second domestic fighter jet development program following the FA-50 series, the KF-21 makes the nation the fourth in the world—joining the United States, China, and Russia—to produce an aircraft featuring stealth avionic architecture.

The Block I program is led by the South Korean government, which holds 60% of the shares. An additional 20% is held by the manufacturer Korea Aerospace Industries (KAI), with Indonesia holding the final 20% stake. Later, in August 2024, Indonesia's stake was reduced to 7.5% due to a request from the Indonesian government. The Block II program, which focuses primarily on the serial integration of air-to-ground and air-to-ship armaments, is already underway. Block III (KF-21EX) program is set to be carried out with newly formed global partnerships.

In April 2021, the first prototype was completed and unveiled during a rollout ceremony at the headquarters of KAI at Sacheon Airport. It was named the Boramae after a juvenile Eurasian goshawk. (Note: The word Boramae (보라매) refers to a young hawk trained specifically for hunting and is more accurately understood as a "young hunting hawk". Historically, the term was used during the Goryeo dynasty to describe juvenile hawks that were captured and trained for falconry, a traditional hunting practice using birds of prey. These trained hawks were also exported or presented as gifts to nobles of the Mongol Empire. The term is believed to be a combination of bor (бор; meaning "tan color") from Mongolian and mae (매; meaning "hawk") from Korean, literally translating to "tan hawk"—a reference to the plumage of a juvenile Eurasian goshawk before reaching maturity. In Korean falconry tradition, birds were classified according to age and training level. A boramae was a hawk less than one year old that had undergone specialized training for hunting. As the hawk matured, it would be referred to by other names, such as sujini (수진이; over one year old) and samgyetcham (삼계참; over three years old). Among these, boramae represented the youngest and most vigorous stage. Despite its youth, a boramae—through systematic training—was capable of capturing large prey such as geese or herons.) The maiden flight was on 19 July 2022. Serial production started in July 2024, with the initial rollout taking place in March 2026. 40 Block I units are scheduled for deployment beginning in September 2026; the ROKAF expects to complete additional 80 Block II units' deployment by 2032. It is available for export. The ROKAF will initially begin replacing its aging F-4D/E Phantom II and F-5E/F Tiger II jets with the KF-21. Over time, the KF-21 will also replace its fleet of KF-16s and F-15Ks in service.

The first mass-produced KF-21 entered service with the Republic of Korea Air Force's 156th Fighter Squadron on 22 September 2026.

== Background ==
Announced in March 2001 by South Korean President Kim Dae-jung at a graduation ceremony of the Korea Air Force Academy, the KF-X project aimed to produce an advanced multirole jet fighter to replace South Korea's aging F-4D/E Phantom II and F-5E/F Tiger II aircraft. In 2002, research and development (R&D) requirements were determined by the Joint Chiefs of Staff. The project was considered extremely ambitious; the Korea Institute for Defense Analyses (KIDA), a state-owned defense ministry think tank, expressed serious doubt about the country's ability to complete such a complex undertaking. The ROK Air Force expressed concerns that a delay or failure of the KF-X program could significantly compromise its future security readiness. During this period, the project faced heavy scrutiny from local media, which maintained a predominantly pessimistic tone regarding its massive budget and technical viability.

Consequently, the program was subjected to a grueling cycle of ten separate feasibility studies, leaving the evaluation phase fraught with delays while its economic cost and potential risks were debated. However, the project received renewed interest after a feasibility study in 2008 and attacks by North Korea in 2010. The last feasibility study concluded that developing the domestic defense industry was considered a matter of national importance and expected to generate positive ripple effects across high-tech sectors despite the project's risks and the significantly higher per-unit cost compared to foreign alternatives. The study still required a foreign partner to mitigate financial risks.

To fulfil the foreign partnership requirement, South Korea first offered Turkey a 20% stake in the KF-X project; however, Turkey declined, seeking greater control over the initiative. The South Korean government expected to commit 60% of the development cost, with the remaining 40% to be covered by domestic and foreign partners. As an alternative, Indonesia agreed to fund the 20% share through Indonesian Aerospace and purchase 50 of the approximately 150–200 planned aircraft. On 15 July 2010, South Korea and Indonesia formalised a partnership, launching the KF-X (Note: In Indonesia, the KF-X program is referred to as the IF-X program.) development program with a target to begin aircraft deliveries in 2026.

== Design and development ==
The initial goal for the program was to develop a single-seat twin-engine multirole fighter with stealth capabilities exceeding the Dassault Rafale, Eurofighter Typhoon, F-16 Fighting Falcon, but less than those of the Lockheed Martin F-35 Lightning II. The Weapon Systems Concept Development and Application Research Center of Konkuk University advised that the KF-X should be superior to the F-16 Fighting Falcon, with 50% greater combat range, 34% longer airframe lifespan, better avionics, active electronically scanned array (AESA) radar, more-effective electronic warfare, and data link capabilities. Their recommendations specified approximately 50,000 pounds-force (220,000 N) of thrust from two engines, supersonic interception and cruising capabilities, and multi-role capabilities. The Block I configuration requirements were later finalised by the ROKAF and DAPA to a 4.5 generation fighter with semi-stealth capabilities.

=== Configuration development and selection ===
A subsonic wind tunnel test of the scale model of KF-X C105 at the Korea Aerospace Research Institute

At the onset of configuration development, South Korea had achieved a 65% indigenous technology localization rate for the KF-X program, prompting efforts to both develop the remaining capabilities domestically and seek international partnerships to fill the gaps. The Agency for Defense Development (ADD) proposed two primary KF-X concepts: C103, resembling the F-35, and C203, modelled after European fighters with forward canards. These configurations were outlined for potential partnership with the United States or European partners.

On the other hand, Korea Aerospace Industries (KAI) and the Defense Acquisition Program Administration (DAPA) proposed the C501 (a.k.a. KFX-E), a third design that prioritised cost reduction through a smaller, single-engine configuration. While more affordable, the C501 offered lower performance compared to the F-16 and was considered unsuitable for operations over Indonesia's large airspace.

Besides, ROKAF favoured a twin-engine design for its superior combat performance, enhanced survivability, and larger airframe capable of accommodating future upgrades. These enhancements could eventually allow the aircraft to be reclassified as a fifth-generation fighter, whereas the C501 remained closer to a fourth-generation standard. By December 2015, the development team had begun designing the KF-X, with initial research and design based on the C103 configuration. After receiving the basic drawings of the C103, C104, and C105 from ADD, the team built an experimental model of the C105 and conducted wind tunnel tests, which were then repeated on the newly designed C107 featuring a larger airframe and greater maximum takeoff weight. An audit in 2015 estimated that 87% of the technologies required for the KF-X program had already been secured by this time.

For the remaining technologies, Lockheed Martin initially agreed with South Korea on transfer of 25 technologies to KAI under an offset trade agreement linked to a contract to acquire 40 F-35As. However, the U.S. later disapproved the transfer of four core technologies - AESA radar, infrared search and track (IRST), electro-optical targeting pod (EO TGP), and radio frequency jammer (RF jammer) technology—requiring South Korea to develop these capabilities domestically. For the rest of 21 general technologies, the U.S. government approved the transfer to South Korea in December 2015, including avionics operational flight program (OFP) software, head-mounted displays (HMD), and aerial refueling control units. Despite its previous partnership on the T-50 design, Lockheed Martin's role in the KF-21 Boramae program was limited. While the company provided guidance to KAI's engineers during the KF-21's development and testing, Lockheed Martin does not possess any design rights to the fighter jet. It later emerged that Lockheed Martin had maintained a skeptical outlook, predicting that the KF-X program would eventually be cancelled or fail to reach completion.

For the initial armaments, the U.S. government delayed integration approval for the Raytheon AIM-120 AMRAAM and AIM-9X Sidewinder, South Korea moved decisively to secure alternatives, quickly integrating the European MBDA Meteor and Diehl IRIS-T to maintain the KF-21's development timeline. These European systems were selected to diversify the platform's strike options and arm initial production blocks while South Korea fast-tracks the development and integration of its own indigenous air-to-air missiles; notably, the U.S. later granted approval for its weapons systems only after the European integration had been finalised.

Following approximately two years of wind tunnel experiments and continued domestic technology development, the C109, jointly proposed by ADD and KAI, was selected in 2018 as the prototype design for the KF-X. The preliminary design was finalised in June 2018, and a critical design review in September 2019, examining 390 technical data sets, confirmed that the KF-X met ROKAF's requirements. The specific mandate for high manoeuvrability, low radar cross-section (RCS), and the higher survivability of a twin-engine configuration naturally dictated an airframe shape similar to the F-22 Raptor, as both aircraft were engineered to meet similar stealth-physics and performance benchmarks. However, in terms of physical dimensions, the aircraft's footprint is more comparable to the F-35 Lightning II than the larger Raptor.

KF-X Design Configuration Comparison
	KAI C501	ADD C103	ADD C104	ADD / KAI C105	ADD / KAI C107	ADD / KAI C109
Empty weight	9,300 kg (20,500 lb)	10,900 kg (24,000 lb)	11,090 kg (24,450 lb)	11,100 kg (24,420 lb)	11,600 kg (25,500 lb)	11,800 kg (26,000 lb)
Max takeoff weight	20,900 kg (46,000 lb)	24,000 kg (53,000 lb)	24,100 kg (53,200 lb)	24,500 kg (53,900 lb)	25,800 kg (56,900 lb)	25,400 kg (56,000 lb)
Internal fuel	3,600 kg (8,000 lb)	5,400 kg (12,000 lb)	5,400 kg (12,000 lb)	5,400 kg (12,000 lb)	>5,400 kg (12,000 lb)	5,400 kg (12,000 lb)
Wingspan	9.8 m (32 ft)	10.7 m (35.2 ft)	10.7 m (35.2 ft)	11.0 m (36.08 ft)	11.2 m (36.7 ft)	11.2 m (36.75 ft)
Length	15.2 m (50 ft)	15.7 m (51.3 ft)	15.7 m (51.3 ft)	16.0 m (52.49 ft)	16.8 m (55.1 ft)	16.9 m (55.4 ft)
Wing area	37.1 sq m (399 sq ft)	42.7 sq m (460 sq ft)	42.7 sq m (460 sq ft)	42.7 sq m (460 sq ft)		46.5 sq m (501 sq ft)
Engine	1 × P&W F100 or GE F110	2 × EJ200 or GE F414	2 × GE F414	2 × GE F414	2 × GE F414	2 × GE F414
Maximum speed	Mach 1.89		Mach 1.97		Mach 1.97	
Hardpoints	9	10	10	10	10	10
Weapons bay	None	Space secured	Space secured	Space secured	Space secured	Space secured

=== Modular design and evolutionary approach ===
KF-21 prototype 3 displayed at Sacheon Airshow 2022

U.S. Air Force F-16 and U-2 and ROK Air Force KF-21, F-35A, and F-15K in formation during an exercise Freedom Flag 2026

The KF-21 program's core philosophy centers on a spiral development model, where the aircraft is introduced in a series of progressively more capable versions, or blocks. This modular approach allows for incremental improvements, with each block introducing new capabilities and technologies. The initial focus was on developing a highly capable 4.5-generation fighter jet with scalability to be upgraded to a true 5th-generation aircraft in later iterations. It was intended to both fulfil the ROKAF's urgent need to retire its F-4 Phantom II and F-5 Tiger II jets and to secure opportunities for future upgrades.

A demonstration flight of KAI KF-21 Boramae at ADEX 2023

The spiral development approach required a significant upfront investment in design, as even the initial Block I must be engineered with future upgrades in mind. The KF-21 was designed from the ground up to accommodate the necessary changes for later iterations, such as a stealth-optimized avionics architecture and the inclusion of a pre-allocated space for an internal weapons bay—a key difference that sets it apart from classic 4th-generation fighters like the Rafale, Eurofighter, and F-16. Unlike those legacy platforms that have reached their physical limits for internal expansion, necessitating external pods and protrusions for new hardware, the KF-21 possesses a spacious internal layout that allows for the embedding of advanced electronic warfare suites and sensors within the airframe; this maintenance of a 'clean' exterior profile is important for preserving low-observable characteristics that older 1980s-era designs struggle to sustain during modernisation.

The initial production version, the KF-21 Block I, is a 4.5-generation fighter with semi-stealth capabilities, featuring main air-to-air armaments mounted on the semi-recessed weapons bay located on the aircraft's belly. The planned Block II variant will be a multi-role aircraft, integrated with a wider range of air-to-ground and anti-ship weapons. The ultimate goal is the Block III, a true 5th-generation stealth fighter, which will feature an internal weapons bay and improved sensors. KAI's strategy is that the Block III can be introduced when the technology and budget are ready, building upon the mature airframe and systems of the earlier blocks. This evolutionary path reduces the initial development risk and shortens the time to fielding an operational aircraft. By focusing on a more attainable 4.5-generation platform first, KAI was able to start serial production and begin squadron service just five years after the first prototype's maiden flight. This approach also makes the program more financially manageable and allows for a "fly before you buy" model for potential export customers. To date, the Air Force chiefs of South Korea, Poland, and the UAE have conducted test flights, while their counterparts from the Philippines, Malaysia, Saudi Arabia, and Peru have performed detailed inspections of the aircraft. These flights are unique in the defense industry, as piloting an airframe still in its development phase involves inherent risks—a fact that highlights the manufacturer's immense confidence in the jet's operational stability.

=== Dual-path approach ===
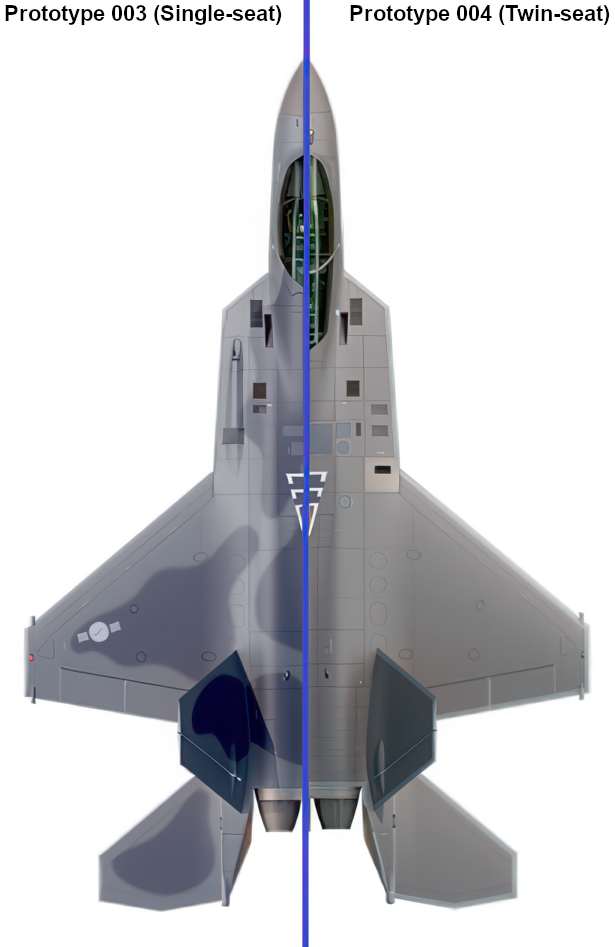
A design comparison of KF-21 prototype 003 (left) and 004 (right) aircraft developed with single and twin seats

The KF-21 program, led by KAI and the ADD, prioritizes the indigenization of technologies where feasible. The rationale behind the KF-21's development is to first create a capable and cost-effective 4.5 generation fighter by combining domestic technological advancement with international expertise. This dual-path approach allows South Korea to avoid the significant time and cost of developing every component from scratch, while simultaneously building its own defense industrial base. Besides, such an approach can also provide future users with further credibility on capability and reliability of a newly developed aircraft. Most importantly, this strategic approach allowed the twin-engine fighter KF-21's unit cost to be 30-40% lower than that of the Rafale and Eurofighter, and even competitive with the latest variant of classic single-engine fighters such as the F-16V and Gripen E/F.

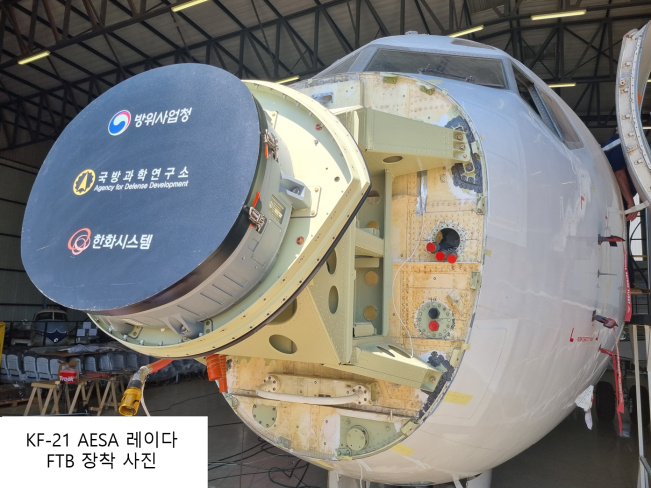
Hanwha Systems APY-016K AESA radar mounted on the KF-X Flying Test Bed (FTB), 2021

By focusing on the in-house development of critical, sensitive technologies like the AESA radar and electronic warfare systems, the program enhances national self-reliance and bypasses potential arms-trading restrictions. For other components, such as engines, KAI contracts with experienced international partners to ensure reliability and performance, helping meet a challenging project timeline and budget. KAI and the ADD have strategically deferred the development of select components—even where a strong indigenous base exists—to avoid potential schedule slippage or unnecessary increases in the jet's unit cost. This balanced strategy maximizes the value of local investment by concentrating on technologies of strategic importance, while leveraging foreign expertise to ensure a high-performance aircraft.

While core technologies such as the AESA radar, EO TGP, IRST, and RF jammer were developed locally, foreign companies provided counter-testing and technical advice to ensure the reliability of these systems and to navigate arms-trading restrictions. In August 2016, Hanwha Systems commenced full-scale development of the AESA radar under the leadership of the ADD. Building upon its fully indigenous development process, Hanwha Systems produced an AESA radar prototype in 2020, with Elta Systems providing third-party verification of its performance. Saab provided technical advice to LIG Nex1, which develops Multi Function Radar (MFR) software for AESA radars. On August 5, 2025, Hanwha Systems unveils the first mass-produced AESA radar. Hanwha Systems also developed the Infrared Search and Track (IRST) system by integrating its proprietary processor unit (PU) and Leonardo’s SkyWard-K sensor head unit (SHU), controlled by specialized software developed in Korea. The electro-optical targeting pod (EO TGP) was developed by Hanwha Systems, and integrated electronic warfare suite (EWS) was developed by LIG Nex1.

KF-21 Boramae engine starting

For the engine, Hanwha Aerospace signed an agreement with General Electric to manufacture General Electric F414 engines for KF-X aircraft. According to the contract, Hanwha is to manufacture key parts, locally assemble the engines, and oversee the installation of the engine on the aircraft. The company will support flight testing and build an extensive support system for the aircraft's operations. As of September 2025, the South Korean government has prioritized the complete localization of the KF-21's propulsion system to mitigate reliance on international supply chains and enhance export competitiveness. In support of this initiative, the Ministry of National Defense allocated ₩86 billion (approximately US$62 million) in the 2026 fiscal budget to replace the US-sourced General Electric F414-GE-400K with a domestic alternative. The development program, led by Hanwha Aerospace and Doosan Enerbility, aims to produce a 16,000 lbf thrust class turbofan engine by the 2030s.

For general components that can be sourced more cost-effectively than developing them domestically, KAI and ADD strategically partnered with numerous international companies. For instance, Texstars was contracted to provide birdstrike-resistant canopy and windshield transparencies. Triumph Group supplies the airframe mounted accessory drives (AMADs), which transfer engine power to other systems. Other notable collaborations include Aeronautical Systems (CESA) for the emergency braking system, United Technologies for the environmental control system, and Martin-Baker for the Mk18 ejection seat. Cobham provides missile ejection launchers, external fuel tanks, and oxygen systems, while Meggitt is responsible for the wheel braking system and internal sensors. standby flight displays, and internal sensors including a fire detection system. The program also benefits from contributions by Elbit Systems for terrain-following systems and Curtiss-Wright, which supplies the flight test instrumentation system for data acquisition. This international cooperation for minor systems highlights a pragmatic approach to the KF-21's development, ensuring the aircraft maintains lower unit cost and is equipped with reliable, proven components.

The strategic approach taken for the KF-21 program, which involves combining local development of core technologies with some international cooperation for minor components, has been noted by militry analysts as a practical and effective way to manage a highly complex project. While other competing programs, such as Turkey's Kaan and India's AMCA, have pursued a more ambitious, fully indigenous development path, the KF-21 model has been credited with achieving its development goals in a relatively efficient manner. The KF-21 program has been recognized for its adherence to its original timeline and budget, a notable accomplishment in a field where major defense programs frequently encounter delays and cost overruns.

The local production rate for domestic components of KF-21 Block I has reportedly exceeded 65%. KAI plans to further increase domestic components during the development of future blocks, at which point it expects to produce reliable parts cost-effectively and within schedule.

=== Open architecture ===
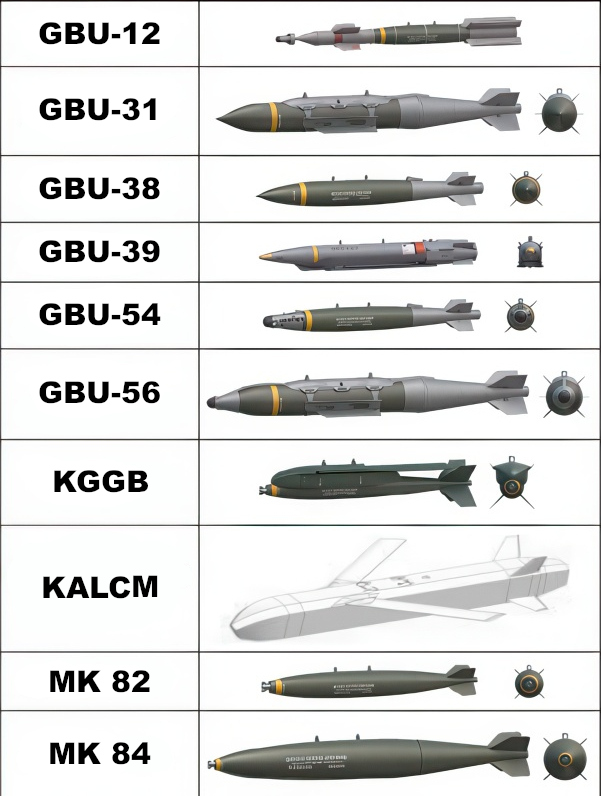
A variety of air-to-surface munitions of the KF-21 Boramae Block II

The KF-21 Boramae is engineered with an Open Mission Systems (OMS) architecture, a design philosophy that mirrors the modularity of modern smartphone operating systems. This framework allows for "plug-and-play" integration of advanced sensors, armaments, and software modules. By utilizing standardized interfaces, the aircraft can undergo rapid hardware and software updates without necessitating a complete overhaul of the core mission computer code. This modularity ensures the platform remains technologically relevant throughout its service life, allowing it to adapt to emerging threats with minimal downtime and reduced developmental costs.

Central to this flexibility is the localization and international standardization of the aircraft's middleware. This software layer acts as a critical translator between low-level hardware—such as AESA radars and weapon pylons—and high-level mission applications, including artificial intelligence (AI) and pilot interfaces. By adopting an internationally recognized standard for this middleware, the KF-21 facilitates the seamless integration of third-party systems and indigenous weapons developed by export customers. This capability is particularly vital for bypassing restrictive international arms regulations (e.g., ITAR), as it allows operators to integrate non-U.S. or non-Korean components with significantly reduced technical friction.

In contrast, legacy platforms such as the Lockheed Martin F-35 Lightning II and the Dassault Rafale serve as prominent examples of closed-loop modular architectures. Although these aircraft pioneered integrated avionics, their systems are fundamentally proprietary ecosystems optimized for specific vendor-controlled hardware and domestic armaments. For international customers, this closed architecture presents significant 'vendor lock' hurdles, making the integration of third-party software or indigenous technology a costly and time-consuming process that requires the original manufacturer's intervention. In contrast, the KF-21 offers greater technical sovereignty by providing an adaptable platform that allows the manufacturer, KAI, to easily integrate custom avionics and strike capabilities tailored to specific national defense requirements.

=== Manned-Unmanned Teaming and AI pilot ===
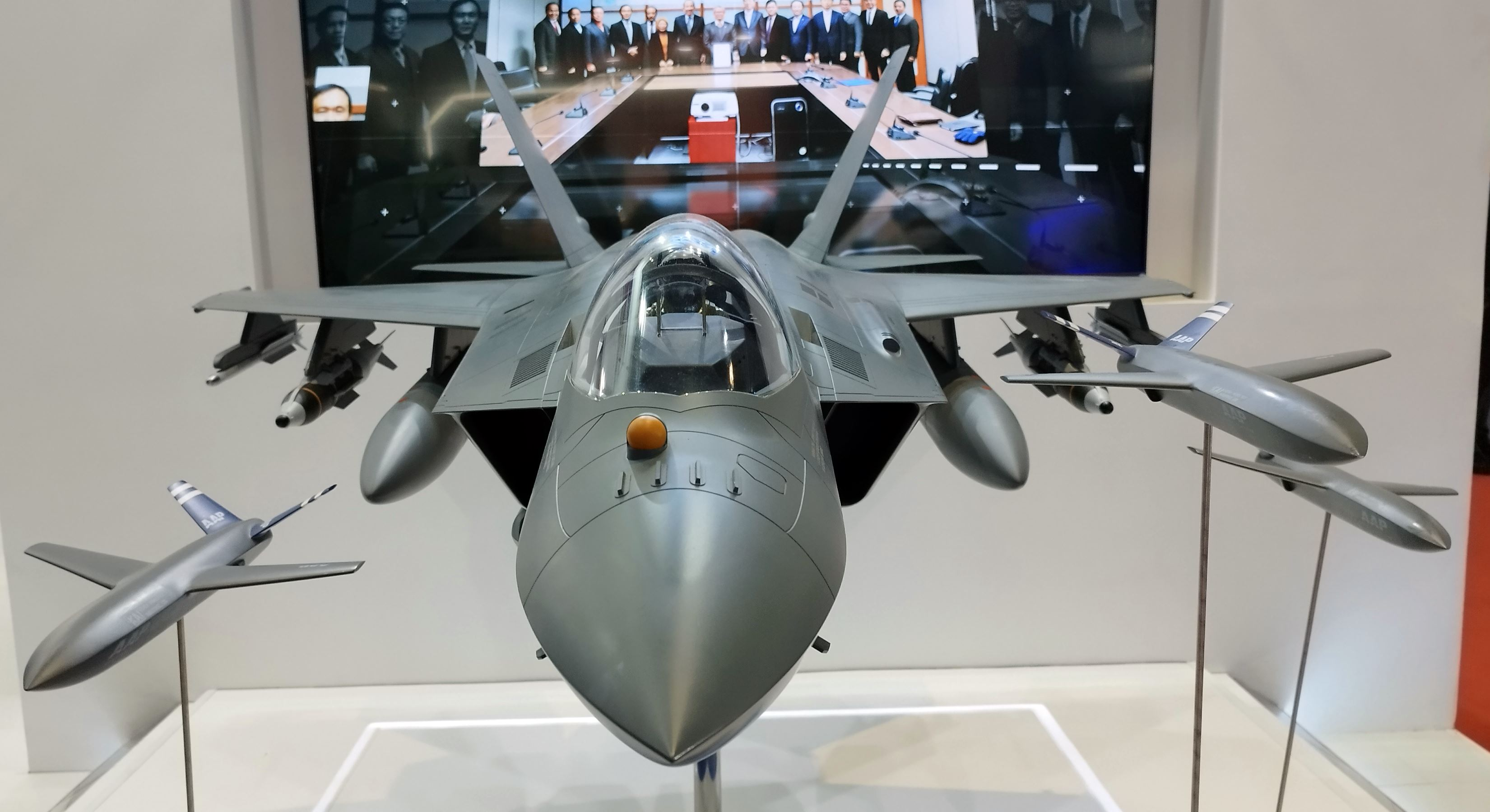
A scale model of the KF-21 with Manned-Unmanned Teaming (MUM-T) UCAVs at the Asian Defense and Security Event (ADAS) 2024 in Pasay

The KF-21 Boramae is designed to serve as the central node in a next-generation Manned-Unmanned Teaming (MUM-T) ecosystem. This operational concept involves a manned fighter controlling multiple highly autonomous Unmanned Combat Aerial Vehicles (UCAVs), often referred to as "Loyal Wingmen." This capability is increasingly recognized as a defining characteristic of 6th-generation air dominance systems, as it shifts the role of the fighter from a standalone combatant to an airborne command-and-control hub. By leveraging the aircraft's advanced data link capabilities and sensor fusion, the KF-21 can delegate high-risk tasks—such as suppression of enemy air defenses (SEAD), electronic warfare, or forward reconnaissance—to its unmanned partners. This synergy significantly enhances the survivability of the manned platform while extending its offensive reach across a contested battlespace.

A critical structural advantage for the KF-21 in this role is the existence of its tandem-seat (twin-seat) variant. Simultaneously developing both single and twin-seat variants is a deliberate strategic decision, as it necessitates a significant increase in development assets, including a larger fleet of specialized prototypes for concurrent flight testing. Unlike the single-seat-only F-35, Su-57, or J-35, the KF-21's twin-seat configuration allows for a specialized division of labor: while the front pilot focuses on flight operations and immediate threats, the rear-seat officer can act as a dedicated mission commander for the unmanned swarm. This second operator manages the complex tactical data and command-and-control (C2) requirements of the "Loyal Wingmen," ensuring that the cognitive load of controlling multiple assets does not overwhelm the pilot during high-intensity combat.

As part of its Next-Generation Air Combat System (NACS), Korea Aerospace Industries (KAI) is developing two distinct classes of Collaborative Combat Aircraft (CCA) to serve as the "arms and wings" of the manned KF-21. The MUCCA (Medium Unmanned Collaborative Combat Aircraft) is a 5.4-ton multi-role platform designed to conduct high-risk air-to-air and air-to-ground missions alongside manned fighters, effectively acting as an attritable yet high-performance force multiplier. In contrast, the SUCA (Small Unmanned Combat Aircraft) is an ultralight 220 kg platform specialized in reconnaissance and electronic warfare support. Together, these systems are managed by an AI Pilot (K-AI Pilot) capable of autonomous tactical recognition and engagement, allowing the human pilot to transition from a traditional flyer to a high-level mission commander within a sophisticated Manned-Unmanned Teaming (MUM-T) network. KAI has indicated that while the baseline technology is being matured through the Block I flight test program, the initial integration of these collaborative capabilities—including the software packages required for multirole MUM-T operations—is slated for the Block II variant, expected to reach operational readiness by 2028.

=== Prototype production and testing ===
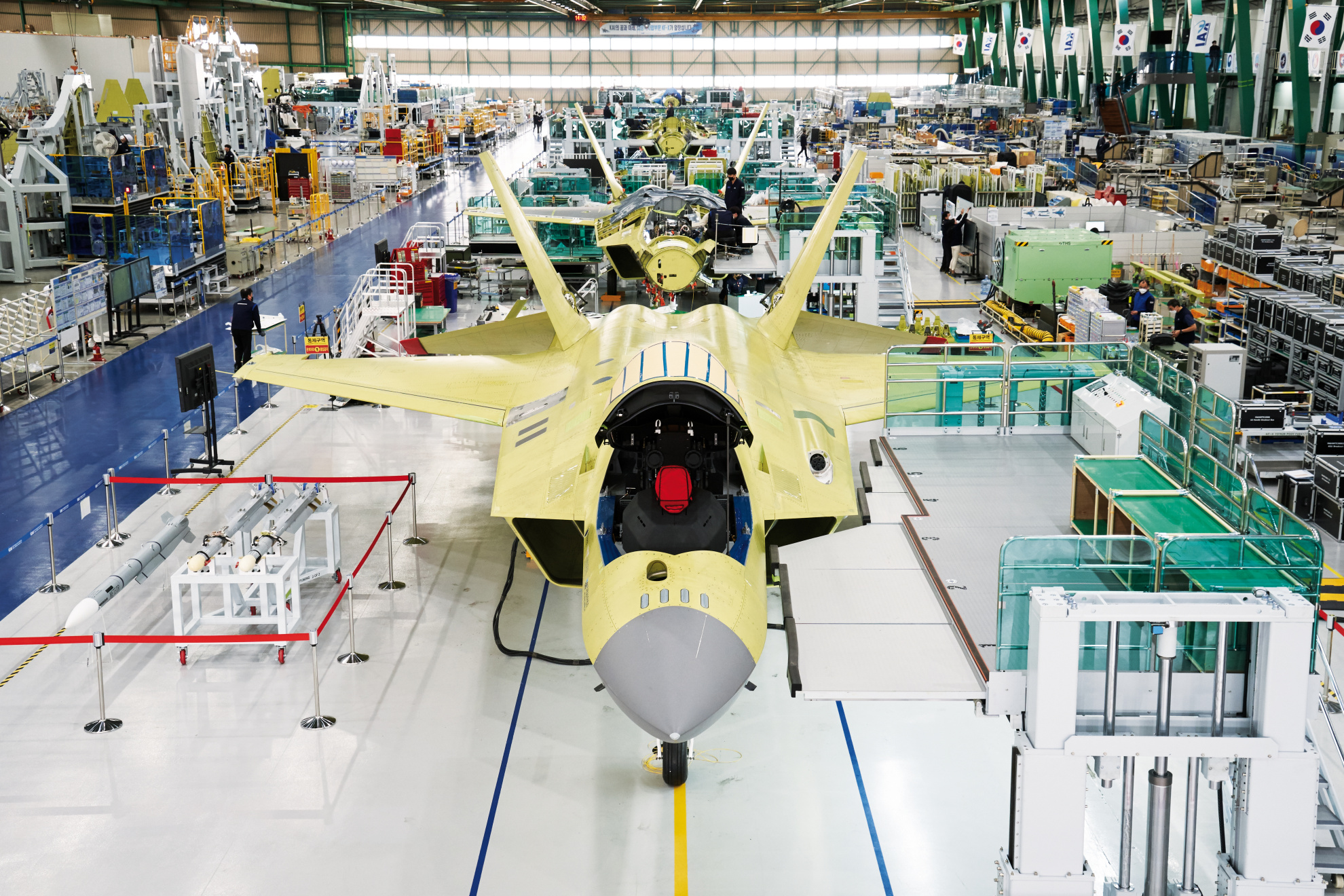
KF-21 Prototypes 3, 4, 5, and 6 at the assembly line, 2021

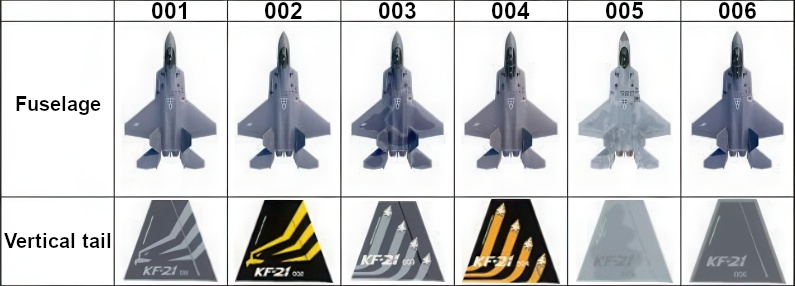
External shape of six KF-21 prototypes, 2023

To significantly accelerate the testing timeline and boost reliability, KAI strategically produced a total of six flying prototypes not just one or two. This was a deliberate departure from the traditional industry practice—where designers typically iterate on a new prototype and are subsequently required to discard data from previous models, mandating that all flight tests be restarted from scratch for the new iteration. In contrast, KAI’s approach—though it required heavy upfront investment—enabled extensive parallel testing and cross-verification, while providing a unique opportunity to test various camouflage patterns simultaneously. Prototypes 1, 2, 3, and 5 were single-seat variants, while prototypes 4 and 6 were dual-seat types. The prototypes were designed to be nearly identical to the final production aircraft to prevent delays and save costs. This strict requirement stemmed from the ROKAF's concern that a program failure could cause a serious gap in their future combat readiness. This strategy is consistent with the choice to forgo a flying demonstrator, a phase that was part of other projects, such as the TAI TF Kaan's P0.

In February 2019, KAI had begun production on the KF-X prototypes and all six aircraft were completed by 2021. These prototypes then underwent four years of flight trials, with the development process concluding by mid-2026. In addition to the six flying prototypes, KAI built two additional prototypes specifically for ground-based tests. The six flight-test aircraft were scheduled to conduct a total of 2,200 flights.

From July 2022 to April 2025, the KF-21 Boramae prototypes underwent an extensive series of tests, demonstrating significant achievements in development and performance. The test program began with initial taxi and engine run tests, leading to the maiden flight of the first prototype on July 19, 2022. Subsequent prototypes, including the single-seat and dual-seat variants, completed their first flights over the following months. A key milestone was the first supersonic flight on January 17, 2023, where the KF-21 broke the sound barrier at an altitude of 40,000 feet. The prototypes were also tested for various operational capabilities, including night flights, aerial refueling, and weapon separation and firing tests with missiles like the Meteor and IRIS-T. Additionally, they performed tests for high angle of attack stability and endured extreme environmental conditions like heavy rain and icing. By May 2024, the KF-21 had reached a top speed of Mach 1.8, and by late 2024, it surpassed 1,000 accident-free flight sorties, solidifying its safety and reliability. These rigorous trials culminated in the aircraft being declared "provisionally suitable for combat" in May 2023, paving the way for further development and eventual mass production.

After three years of flight testing the KF-21 prototype, only one observable design change has been implemented on the initial serial production models being assembled: the sharp, angular sides of the inboard tail booms next to the two GE Aerospace F414 engine nozzles have been flattened. This minor modification was necessary to correct a slight vibration that test pilots had detected while operating the prototype aircraft within specific flight conditions.

==== Testing achievements ====
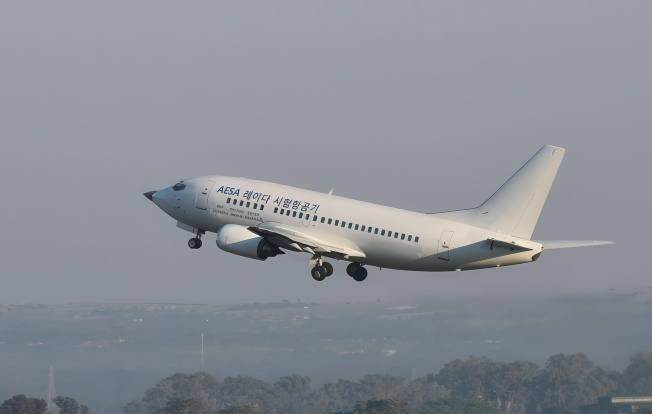
KF-X airborne radar testbed modified based on Boeing 737 aircraft

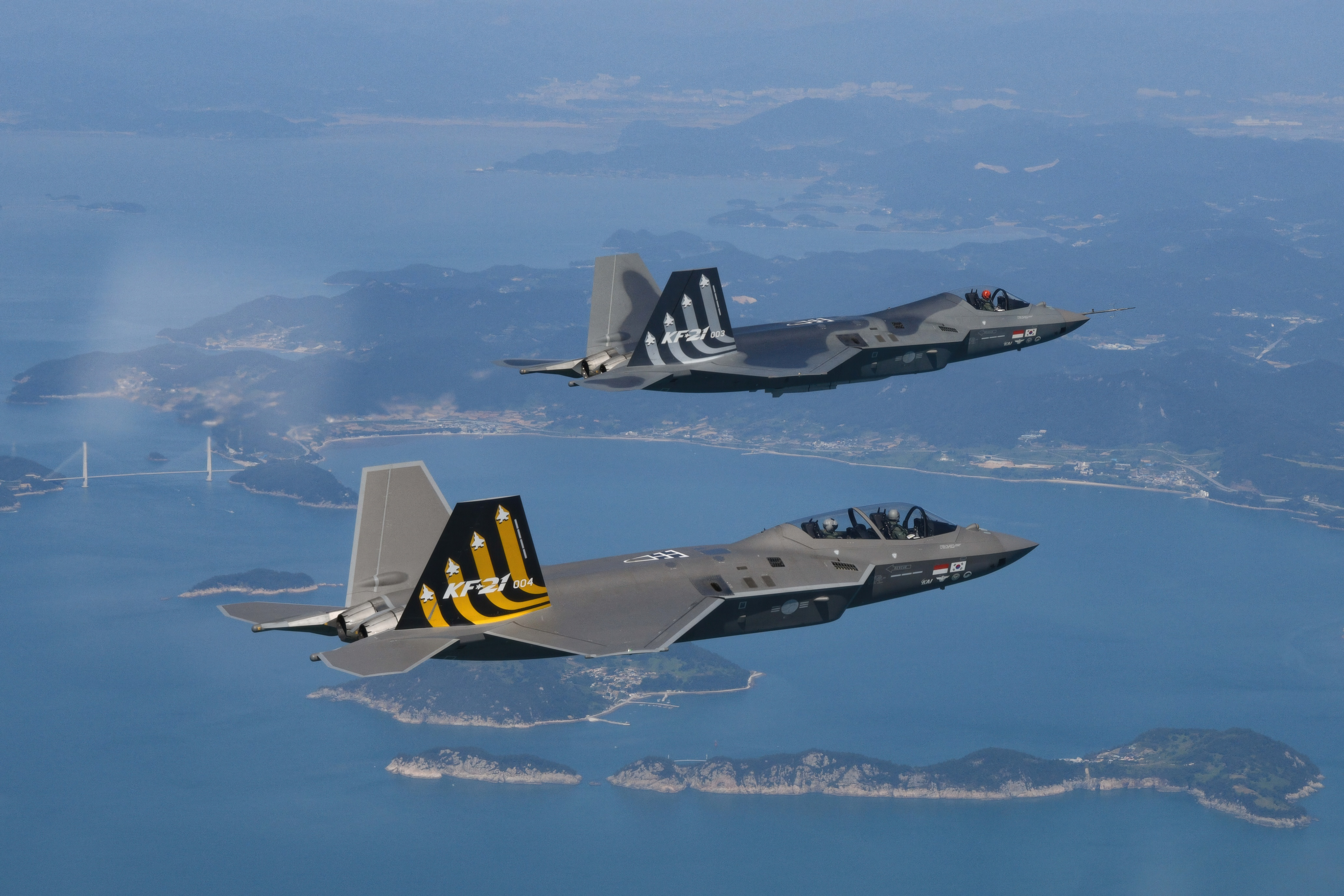
Prototype 003 and 004 in formation, 2023

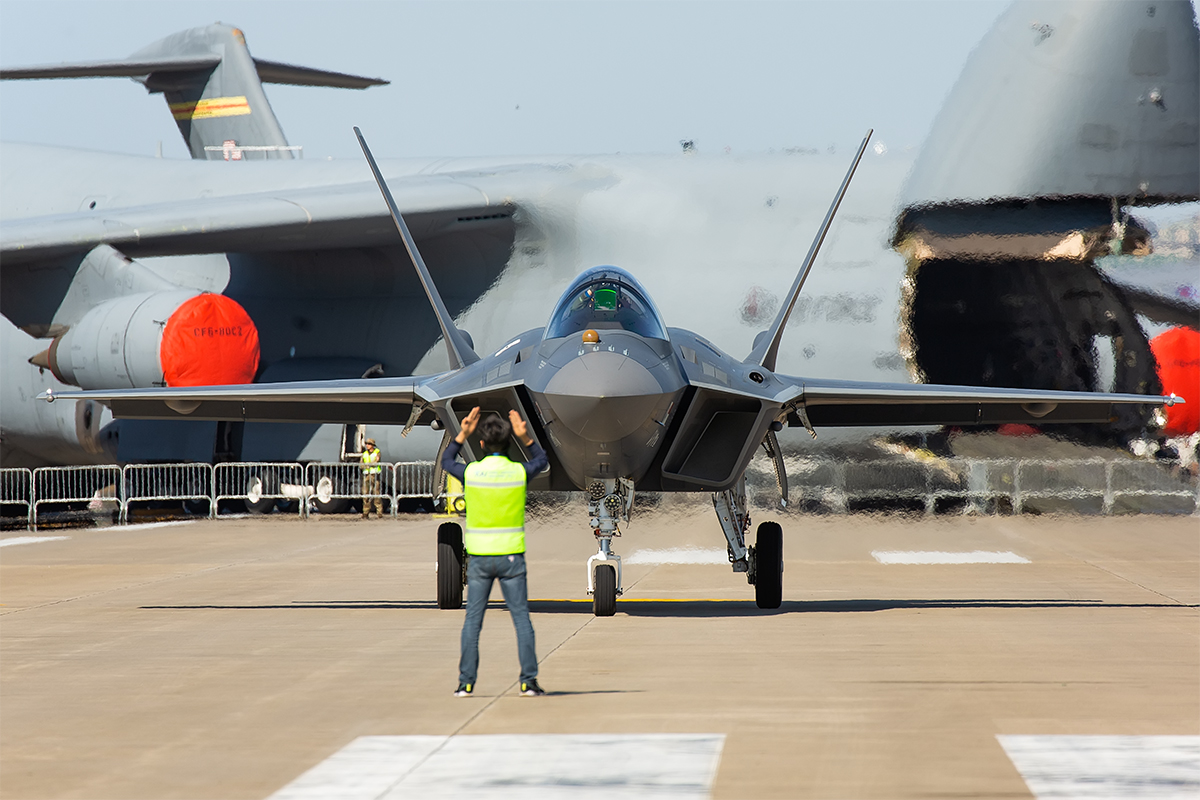
Taxiing KF-21 prototype at Seoul ADEX 2023

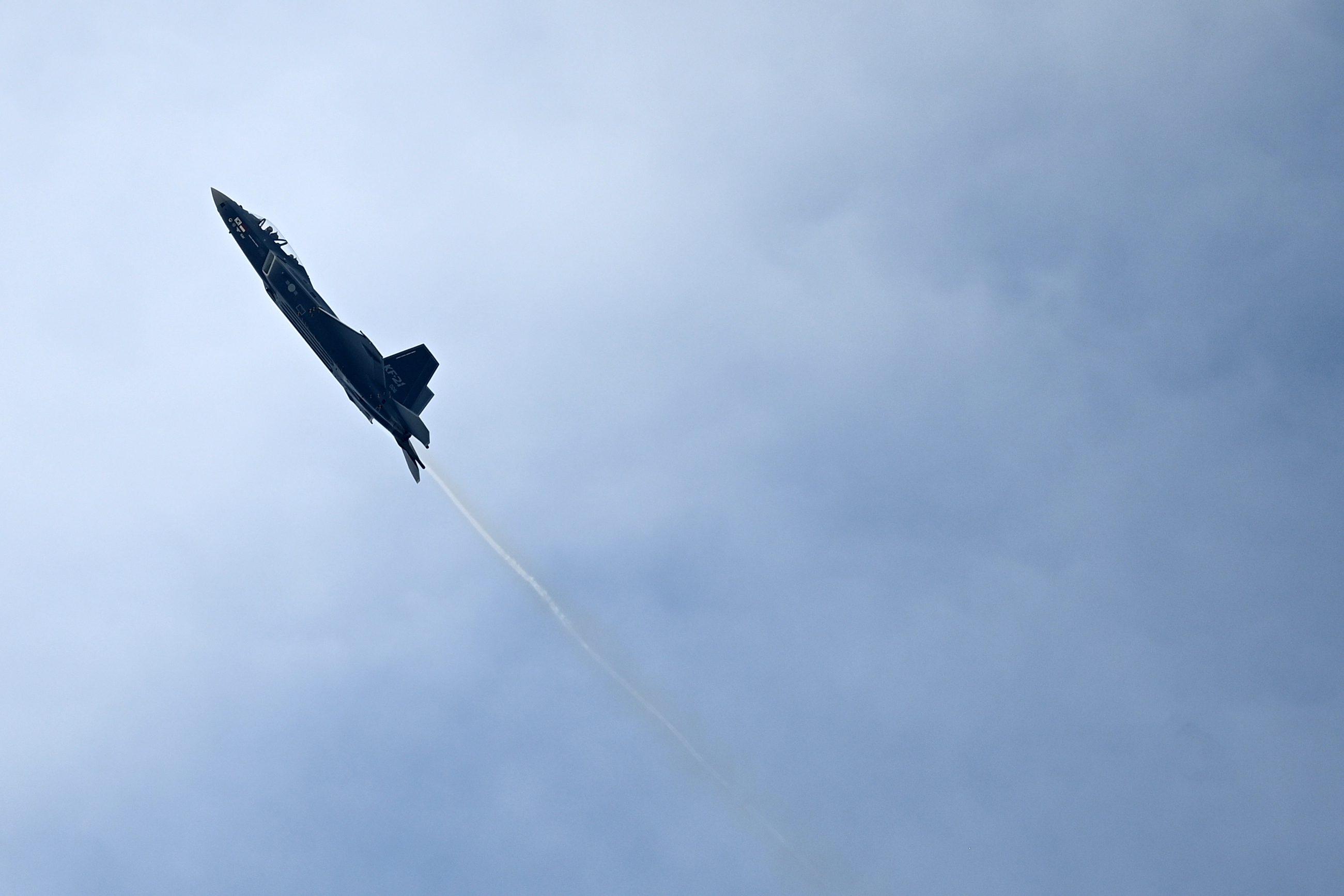
Soaring KF-21 prototype, 2023

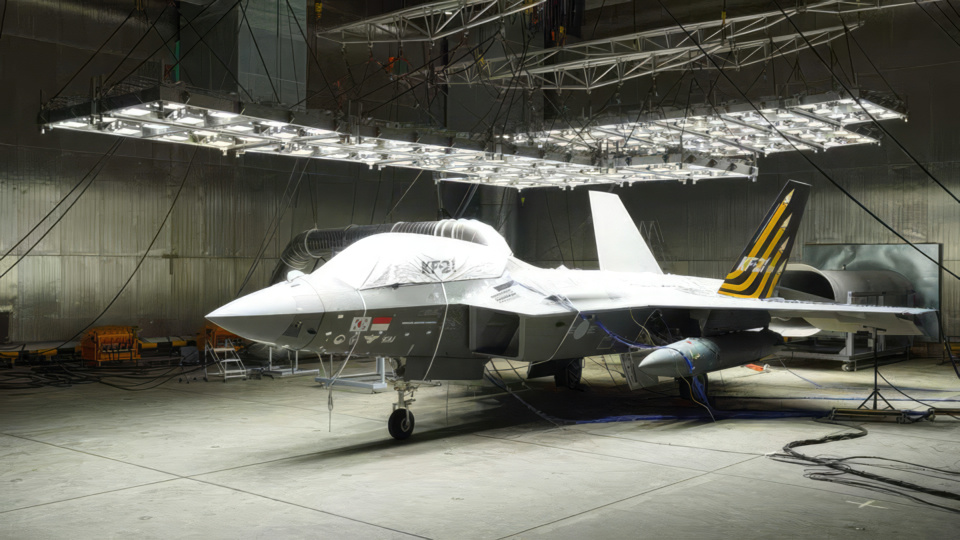
The fourth prototype during a full-scale airframe environmental testing, 2024

In January 2022, the KF-21 prototype experienced final assembly.

In March 2022, ground testing was conducted for the AESA radar. The AESA radar of the KF-21 is equipped with about 1,000 transmit-receive modules and electronically steers the radar beam by adjusting the phase of the radio waves.

In April 2022, the AESA radar began its domestic flight tests. By the first half of 2023, all developed functional and performance requirements of the AESA radar were verified through flight tests. Various flight scenarios and repeated tests improved the completeness and reliability of the AESA radar. In South Africa, a civilian aircraft (Boeing 737-500) was modified to create a test aircraft (FTB: Flying Test Bed) equipped with the AESA radar. From November to December 2021, a total of 10 sorties were conducted to test the basic functions and performance of the radar, including its most critical performance, maximum detection range.

On 6 July 2022, the first prototype of the KF-21 conducted a ramp taxi test in preparation for its maiden flight.

On 7 July 2022, the final engine run test. and a high speed taxi test was conducted in preparation for its maiden flight.

On 19 July 2022, the KF-21 successfully completed its maiden flight. The KF-21 took off at 3:40 PM and landed at 4:13 PM, marking a successful 33-minute first flight. It will undergo approximately 2,000 flight tests in the future to verify various performance aspects and weapons compatibility.

On 28 September 2022, the ROKAF released a video demonstrating the KF-21's landing gear operation during flight, addressing public curiosity about the mechanics of the landing gears and caps.

On 10 November 2022, the second prototype took off from Sacheon Air Base in South Gyeongsang Province, tested its flight performance for 35 minutes, and landed safely.

On 3 January 2023, the third prototype successfully completed its first test flight. The third prototype took off from the 3rd Training Wing in Sacheon, South Gyeongsang Province at 1:01 PM and landed at 1:38 PM. The first test flight recorded a maximum speed of 370 km/h and a maximum altitude of 4,600 meters, which is similar to the levels achieved by the first and second prototypes. The third prototype is equipped with speed and structural load expansion measurement systems. It is expected to facilitate smoother speed and structural load expansion tests, which constitute a significant portion of the KF-21 system development flight tests.

On 17 January 2023, the KF-21 successfully achieved its first supersonic flight. The KF-21 first prototype took off from the ROKAF's 3rd Training Wing and broke the sound barrier (Mach 1.0, approximately 1,224 km/h) for the first time while flying at an altitude of about 40,000 feet over the South Sea.

On 20 February 2023, DAPA announced that the fourth prototype of the KF-21 successfully completed its maiden flight, taking off from the 3rd Training Wing in Sacheon at 11:19 AM and landing at 11:53 AM after a 34-minute flight. The fourth prototype is a two-seat aircraft with seats arranged in tandem, accommodating two pilots. The two-seat KF-21 will primarily be used for training new pilots (prototype composition: 4 single-seat (prototypes 1, 2, 3, 5), 2 two-seat (prototypes 4, 6)). Despite being a two-seat aircraft, only one pilot flew the fourth prototype for this initial flight to verify early flight stability. Until the completion of system development in June 2026, the fourth prototype will undergo various flight tests to assess the impact of design differences on the aircraft, perform AESA radar avionics tests, and more. The livery of the fourth prototype features an image of four aircraft simultaneously ascending into the sky on the vertical tail, similar to the third prototype, but with yellow-colored ascending aircraft. With the fifth and sixth prototypes starting flight tests in the first half of 2023, all six prototypes will continue expanding the flight envelope and verifying aircraft performance through continuous flight tests.

On 9 March 2023, KF-21 prototypes 3 and 4 successfully completed a night flight test and landed safely. During this test flight, the proper functioning of both internal and external lighting systems on the aircraft was verified in a low-light environment. The lighting on the aircraft plays an important role in night flights, including collision avoidance and identification of instruments for the pilot. With this successful test, it is expected that the KF-21 will be capable of performing nighttime missions.

On 28 March 2023, DAPA announced, 'The KF-21 successfully conducted air-to-air weapon separation tests and aerial gun firing tests over the South Sea, taking off from the Air Force's 3rd Training Wing in Sacheon.' The second KF-21 prototype conducted weapon separation tests with Meteor medium-range air-to-air missile test round, while the third prototype performed aerial gun firing tests with around 100 rounds. These tests aimed to verify the safety by checking changes in the aircraft's structure, engine, and aerodynamic characteristics that can occur when weapons are separated or guns are fired from the fighter jet, and to confirm the normal operation of avionics systems related to weapon operation. Since its maiden flight in July 2022, the KF-21 has conducted approximately 150 flight tests, successfully verifying its supersonic flight capabilities and the performance of advanced avionics including the AESA radar.

On 4 April 2023, the KF-21 successfully conducted a weapon separation test with AIM-2000 short-range air-to-air missile test round. This test aimed to verify the safety by checking for changes in the aircraft's structure, engine, and aerodynamic characteristics that can occur when weapons are separated from the fighter jet, and to confirm the normal operation of avionics systems related to weapon operation.

On 16 May 2023, DAPA announced that the fifth prototype successfully completed its maiden flight, taking off from the 3rd Training Wing in Sacheon and flying over the South Sea. With the successful maiden flight of the fifth prototype, all four single-seat KF-21 prototypes have now completed their first flights. The fifth prototype will primarily conduct avionics performance verification tests, including those for the AESA radar, and is scheduled to undergo aerial refueling tests in the second half of 2023.

On 23 May 2023, DAPA revealed the site of the mounting demonstration for the Meteor medium-range air-to-air missile and the AIM-2000 short-range air-to-air missile.

On May 16, 2023, DAPA announced that the KF-21 Boramae had been declared "provisionally suitable for combat." After over two decades of development, including more than 200 flight tests, the KF-21 has proven its capabilities, such as supersonic and night flight, and has successfully tested its Active Electronically Scanned Array (AESA) radar and AIM-2000 air-to-air missile separation.

On 28 June, DAPA announced that the sixth prototype successfully completed its maiden flight, taking off from the 3rd Training Wing in Sacheon, and flying for 33 minutes from 3:49 PM to 4:22 PM. With the successful maiden flight of the sixth prototype, all six KF-21 flight test prototypes have now completed their first flights. This milestone comes 11 months after the first prototype's successful flight on 19 July 2022.

On 12 October 2023, the KF-21 prototypes 3 and 4 conducted a formation flight.

On 20 October 2023, at the Seoul ADEX, the KF-21 showcased its technological capabilities during a five-minute demonstration, performing manoeuvres such as horizontal sharp turns and inverted flights. This was the first time the aircraft's flight performance was revealed to the public.

On 12 January 2024, the KF-21 second prototype successfully conducted a high angle of attack (AOA) flight stability test. The aircraft maintained a maximum pitch angle of approximately 70 degrees, flew to an altitude of over 38,000 feet, and then successfully returned to a stable flight condition after reaching a low-speed state (below approximately 20 KCAS).

On 19 March 2024, DAPA announced that the fifth prototype (single-seat) successfully completed an aerial refueling flight over the South Sea after taking off from the Air Force's 3rd Training Wing in Sacheon. This achievement has secured the KF-21's long-range operational capability.

On 22 April 2024, the KF-21 fourth prototype conducted a "full-scale environmental test" at the Agency for Defense Development's Haemi Test Center. This test verifies the aircraft's normal operation in extreme environments (low temperature, heavy rain, and icing). The test simulated extreme rain and icing conditions on the ground to check the KF-21's waterproof and anti-icing performance. The test results were successful.

In May 2024, the KF-21 surpassed Mach 1.8, the highest speed achieved by a domestically produced fighter jet, during a test flight.

On 8 May 2024, a KF-21 equipped with a Meteor missile successfully completed its test from Sacheon Airport. The same day, it also aced an AIM-2000 missile test, tracking a drone 87 km away and passing within 1 meter using AESA radar. Later that month, a KF-21 successfully fired an IRIS-T missile for the first time, following earlier tests with an unguided dummy missile of the same type in 2023.

On 24 October 2024, Prototype 6 of the KF-21 Boramae demonstrated exceptional stability and agility at Sacheon Airshow 2024, performing advanced manoeuvres with precision.

On 28 November 2024, KAI's KF-21 Boramae achieved a milestone of 1,000 accident-free flight sorties, showcasing its outstanding safety and reliability.

On 19 February 2025, Air Force Chief of Staff Lee Young-su participated in a KF-21 Boramae test flight at Sacheon Air Base, becoming the first non-test pilot to fly aboard the aircraft. Gen. Lee flew at an altitude of approximately 4,500 meters over the southern coast at a speed exceeding 1,000 km/h, assessing the KF-21's stable aerial operational capabilities. Additionally, he flew alongside a KF-16 to verify its tactical interoperability with other aircraft.

On 8 April 2025, the KF-21 Boramae successfully conducted its first nighttime aerial refueling trial with the KC-330 tanker. Performed using the fourth prototype, the test was completed on the first attempt under low-visibility conditions, demonstrating the aircraft's all-weather and long-range operational capabilities.

=== Serial production ===
In June 2024, 20 units of KF-21 Block I ordered for a value of US$1.41 billion.

In July 2024, the serial production of the 20 KF-21 Block I started.

On May 20, 2025, the Defense Acquisition Program Administration (DAPA) marked the start of final assembly for the first mass-produced KF-21 Boramae fighter jet with a special ceremony.

In June 2025, additional 20 units of KF-21 Block I ordered with the delivery of 40 units to begin in March 2026 (since delayed) and to be completed by 2028.

On August 5, 2025, Hanwha Systems rolls out the first mass-produced AESA radar. The resulting domestically produced radar, the APY-016K is equipped with approximately 1,000 transmit-receive modules, enabling it to detect targets from 150 to 200 km away and track about 20 targets simultaneously, allowing the KF-21 to engage multiple enemies effectively.

On August 8, 2025, DAPA reported that the KF-21 Block II version, which includes air-to-ground (A2G) capabilities, is now anticipated to be ready by early 2027. This acceleration of the development schedule by more than 1.5 years demonstrates that the project has exceeded its initial expectations.

On October 17, 2025, during the first public day of the Seoul ADEX 2025, the KF-21 Boramae successfully demonstrated a series of high-difficulty aerial maneuvers at Seoul Airport, showcasing its advanced combat agility. Unlike previous exhibitions, this flight was conducted with G-force restrictions lifted, allowing the indigenous supersonic fighter to perform high-speed sharp turns, inverted flights, vertical climbs, and rolls, as well as a low-altitude flyby reaching speeds of approximately 1,000 km/h. Military officials and observers noted that while the KF-21 had appeared at the previous year's event, this latest performance utilized more sophisticated piloting and intensified maneuverability to definitively prove the aircraft's operational stability and superior flight performance to the public.

On December 23, 2025, the Defense Acquisition Program Administration (DAPA) officially launched the KF-21 Additional Armament Test Project during a kick-off meeting at Korea Aerospace Industries (KAI) in Sacheon. This 700 billion KRW initiative is dedicated to transforming the KF-21 into a full-scale multirole fighter by integrating and verifying more than 10 types of air-to-ground munitions by December 2028. Building on the success of earlier air-to-air tests and flight stability trials, the project aims to fast-track the deployment of ground-strike capabilities by approximately 18 months, with the first certified weapons expected to be integrated into mass-produced units starting in 2027. Additionally, the DAPA made public a video documenting "pit drop" testing for several key munitions, including the GBU-12 Paveway II, the GBU-56 LJDAM, and the domestically developed KALCM Cheonryong. These trials signify that the integration process for the Block II phase—which focuses on multi-role air-to-ground capabilities—is already well underway even before Block I development reaches its conclusion.

On January 13, 2026, South Korea's Defense Acquisition Program Administration (DAPA) announced the successful completion of the flight testing phase for the KF-21 Boramae. Over a 42-month period, the project achieved approximately 1,600 accident-free flights and verified 13,000 test conditions, including advanced maneuvers, air-to-air weapon launches, and the nation's first-ever aerial refueling tests. By expanding test sites and improving operational efficiency, DAPA shortened the development timeline by two months, concluding the final verification with Prototype No. 4 over the South Sea.

On March 25, 2026, Korea Aerospace Industries (KAI) held the official rollout ceremony for the first mass-produced KF-21 Boramae, marking a significant milestone in the transition from development to active deployment.

On April 15, 2026, the first mass-produced KF-21 Boramae successfully completed its maiden production test flight at the 3rd Training Wing in Sacheon, occurring just 21 days after its official rollout ceremony. This flight, conducted by Republic of Korea Air Force personnel, served as the final validation to ensure that the mass-produced airframe accurately replicates the performance and reliability established during the prototype phase's 1,600 test sorties.

In June 16, 2026, the Defense Acquisition Program Administration (DAPA) announced that the KAI KF-21 Boramae had successfully achieved full Type Certification, concluding a rigorous five-year airworthiness review process that began in 2021. The Airworthiness Certification Committee verified that the aircraft met all 745 inspection items across 14 distinct categories, including structural integrity, weapons integration, and electronic systems. Following the initial "combat readiness" provisional approval achieved in May 2023, this final certification officially validates the aircraft's flight safety and structural integrity under extreme operating conditions.

=== Program funding ===
The funding for the KF-X project is a multi-party effort, primarily led by the South Korean government. The development phase, with an initial cost estimated at 8.8 trillion won (approximately US$7.8 billion), is a joint venture. The South Korean government holds the majority financial responsibility, originally committed to funding 60% of the project. KAI, the prime manufacturer, contributes 20%. The remaining 20% was to be funded by Indonesia; however, due to economic difficulties, Indonesia has struggled with its payments. This led to a revised agreement in August 2024, where South Korea agreed to reduce Indonesia's financial obligation to 600 billion won, which is about one-third of their original contribution (7.5%). This adjustment means that South Korean partners, including the government and KAI, will absorb the shortfall to ensure the project's successful completion and on-schedule delivery. It is known that multiple countries expressed interest in participating in the program by covering Indonesia's funding responsibility to gain their qualifications; among these nations are Poland and the United Arab Emirates (UAE).

Indonesia's Payment Status (2016–2024)
Year	Target Amount (KRW)	Actual Payment (KRW)	Unpaid Balance (Cumulative)
2016	50 billion	50 billion	0
2017	184.1 billion	45.2 billion	138.9 billion
2018	198.7 billion	0	337.6 billion
2019	190.7 billion	132 billion	396.3 billion
2020	208.1 billion	0	604.4 billion
2021	199.4 billion	0	803.8 billion
2022	173.4 billion	9.4 billion	967.8 billion
2023	130 billion	41.7 billion	1.056 trillion
2024	130 billion	106.1 billion	1.08 trillion
Total (2016–2024)	1.4644 trillion	384.4 billion	1.08 trillion

==== Indonesia's contributions and financial challenges ====
In July 2010, the Indonesian government agreed to fund 20% of the KF-X project cost in return for prototype 005 (designated IF-X), system development participation, technical data, and production sharing. In August 2011, a joint research center was opened in Daejeon, South Korea. The second agreement between Indonesia and Korea was a work assignment agreement between KAI and Indonesia's state-owned aerospace manufacturer PT Dirgantara (PTDI). As per this agreement, PTDI sent 100 engineers to South Korea to take part in the structural design of the KF-21, to play a role in its development over time.

In November 2017, Indonesia, through state-owned Indonesia Aerospace, failed to pay its share of the latest round of development costs, prompting criticism from South Korea. As of 2019, Indonesia was renegotiating its involvement in the program. FlightGlobal reported in July 2019 that Indonesia was exploring payment in Indonesia-produced armaments instead of cash. By July 2019, Indonesia was approximately ₩300 billion in arrears.

Yonhap reported in October 2019 that, according to DAPA Korea, there were 114 Indonesian engineers participating during the peak of the KF-21 design phase in July 2019 and the development was ready to go to the prototyping stage after it met all of the requirements in September 2019.

According to a September 2023 report from Yonhap, the South Korean state news agency, Indonesia had paid only US$208 million since 2016 on the research and development stage Another report stated that Indonesia paid US$205 million for research and development and owed about US$420 million. In December 2020, a report showed that Indonesia was likely to pull out of the project. Another stated that South Korea and Indonesia planned to move forward on the KFX/IFX project.

In August 2021, Indonesia reaffirmed its interest in the KF-21 program, with Indonesian engineers returning to South Korea to continue their work. Further agreement on the costs has been reached between the two countries.

According to reports in May 2022, the issue of Indonesia's unpaid US$4.2 million in development costs had not been resolved. In November 2021, Indonesia and South Korea agreed to draw up a new sharing agreement for development costs by March 2022, but it had not been implemented so far. In November 2022, reportedly Indonesia has resumed payment for its share of the cost for a joint fighter development project.

At the Polish-Korean Defense Industry Cooperation Conference in Warsaw in November 2022, Sebastian Chwałek, chairman of Polish Armaments Group (PGZ), a state-owned defense company, expressed his desire to participate in the KF-21 project.

According to a South Korean government official, in May 2023, during a visit to Korea in mid-April 2023, Sebastian Chwałek, chairman of the PGZ, expressed Poland's desire to participate in the KF-21 project. Specifically, the Polish government wanted to join the project as a development partner in 2026, after the KF-21 Block 1 is developed and when Block 2 begins development. It is reported that the Polish government is discussing the possibility of acquiring Indonesia's stake in the program by paying the ₩800 billion in overdue contribution funds that the Indonesian government has failed to pay. PGZ reportedly plans to deliver a letter of intent to participate in development partners to the South Korean government soon through the Polish government. The South Korean Defense Acquisition Program Administration said it will begin a full-fledged review once it receives a letter of intent from the Polish government.

In September 2023 it was reported that Indonesia did not make its payments, and South Korea had signed a memorandum of understanding with the United Arab Emirates (UAE), that the UAE would buy Indonesia's KF-21 shares and be part of the KF-21 program as a partner. The rumors about the UAE joining the KF-21 program was denied by DAPA based on Korean government-owned media, Yonhap. Indonesian Defense Ministry Technology Director Air Vice Marshal Dedy Laksmono confirmed to the press on 29 October 2023 that the budget for 2024 cost share payment had been set aside at 1.25 trillion rupiah (US$80 million).

On 21 February 2024, on the sidelines of the G20 meeting in Rio de Janeiro, Brazil, Indonesia foreign minister Retno Marsudi and her counterpart South Korean foreign minister, Cho Tae-Yul, discussed the KF-21/IFX program, and both parties once again reaffirmed their commitment to continue the joint development program between the two countries.

The KAI CEO said in the Korean media that Indonesia entering the program is pretty significant for KF-21 development and the program could have been stalled if there was no continued Indonesia participation.

On 16 August 2024, the 163rd Defense Acquisition Program Promotion Committee readjusted the development contributions Indonesia was supposed to pay from ₩1.6 trillion to ₩600 billion, and Indonesia's stake was reduced to 7.5% as the shortfall was decided to be covered by the Korean government's additional budget. The deal was agreed in June 2025 and Indonesia has restarted payments on late 2025, but under this new adjustment Indonesia will not receive a prototype of the aircraft.

On 27 June 2025, Colonel Ferrel "Venom" Rigonald of the Indonesian Air Force became the first Indonesian pilot to fly the aircraft. He flew the aircraft for an hour long test flight accompanied with KAI test pilot, Koh Hwi Seok. The test flight by an Indonesian pilot reaffirms Indonesia's participation in the program. On 30 September 2025, another Indonesian test pilot, Colonel Mohammad "Mammoth" Sugiyanto, conducted an hour long test flight, accompanied again by KAI test pilot Koh Hwi Seok. This flight is Sugiyanto's first flight from the pilot seat after he previously flew the aircraft from the rear seat on 16 May 2023.

After high level talks between Presidents Lee Jae Myung and Prabowo Subianto agreeing to expand defense cooperation ties to special comprehensive strategic partnership, South Korea mulled on transferring a single seated prototype of the aircraft to Indonesia. DAPA announced that they will decide on the transfer schedule once Indonesia has fulfilled their 600 million won contribution. As of 8 April 2026, Indonesia has paid 536 million won and is expected to pay the remaining 64 million won in June 2026 in order to make the transfer possible. On 10 June 2026, Ambassador Cecep Herawan announced that one KF-21 prototype will be transferred to Indonesia with outstanding payments has been concluded. KAI confirms the prototype transfer will be conducted with both sides discussed about the transfer mechanism. However, Indonesian Ministry of Defense announced that the co-production of KF-21 with PTDI has been cancelled and has instead opted to purchase the aircraft as a regular customer, ending all contributions despite concluding payment on the remaining contribution.

Indonesian Defense Ministry official never said that co-production of KF21 with PTDI has been cancelled, he only said that the possible initial 16 KF21 order will be direct order from Korea and no final assembly in PTDI This doesnt mean there is no co-production with PTDI as PTDI (Indonesian Aerospace) Vice President of Business Development, Heber MF Panjaitan, stated on 20 September 2026 that PTDI has secured an Industrial Collaboration Agreement (ICA) with Korea Aerospace Industry to manufacture 15% of the KF21 airframe for aircraft intended for Indonesian Aerospace.

== Challenges and setbacks ==
=== Foreign bribery allegations ===
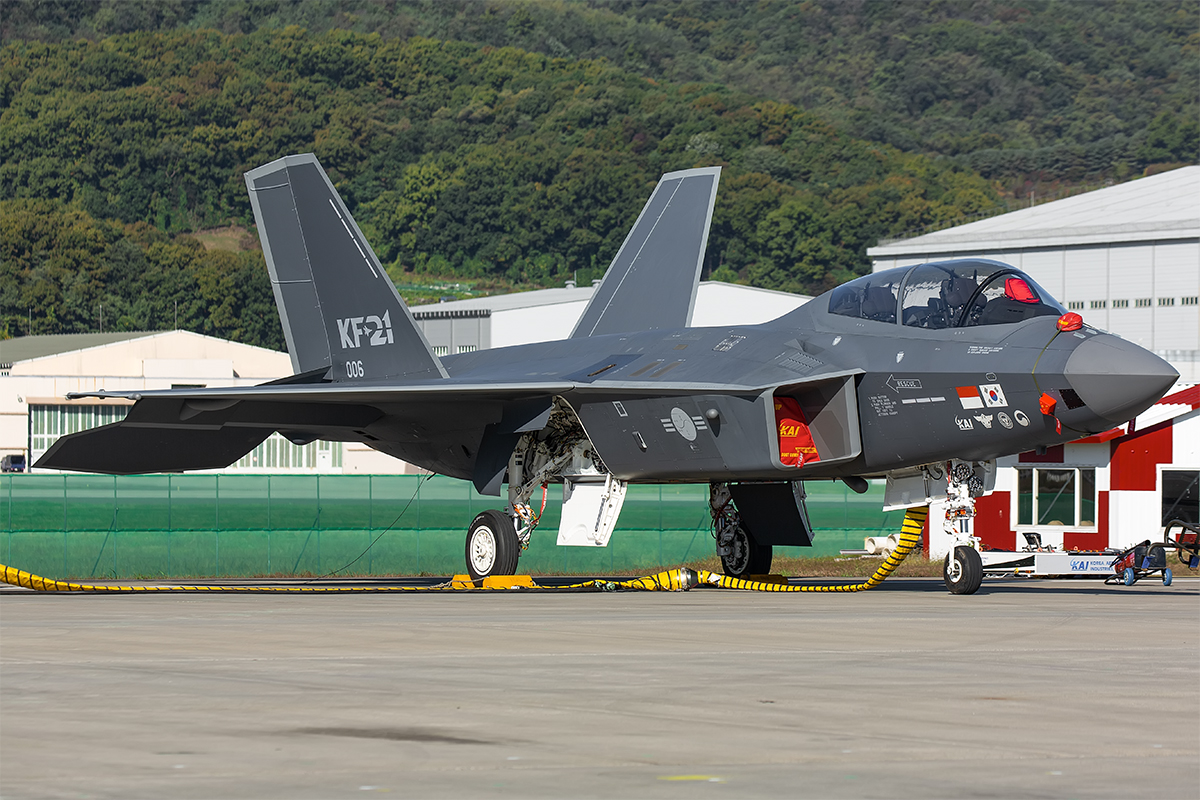
Prototype number 006 in 2023

In October 2009, a retired ROKAF general was arrested for leaking classified documents to Saab. The general was alleged to have been given a bribe of several hundred thousand dollars for copies of a number of secret documents that he had photographed. Saab officials denied any involvement.

The Defense Security Command (DSC) found evidence that another foreign defense firm had also bribed a member of the Security Management Institute (SMI). President Lee Myung-bak believed that such corruption resulted in a 20% increase in the defense budget.

=== Opposition ===
In 2017, the Korean defense think tank KIDA told a public meeting that South Korea is not technologically equipped to develop the KF-X aircraft, that the project is economically unviable and that the KF-X would not be a successful export product. It also questioned the ADD cost estimates. DAPA's estimated ₩6 trillion development cost was criticized by some analysts, who said the project could cost up to ₩8.5 trillion.

Defense researcher Lee Juhyeong held a seminar on the program, stating that the KF-X development would cost more than ₩10 trillion (US$9.2 billion) and could cost more than twice as much as an imported aircraft over the life of the program.

Critics noted that the KF-X would cost up to twice as much as a top-end F-16 model and that Japan had encountered a similar situation with its Mitsubishi F-2.

=== EADS funding pullout ===
In May 2013, EADS (European Aeronautic Defence and Space Company), the defense subsidiary of Airbus, offered a US$2 billion investment into the KF-X program, if South Korea selected its Eurofighter Typhoon for the F-X Phase 3 fighter procurement program. The US F-35A was selected instead. EADS repeated its investment offer, for a split-buy of 40 Eurofighters and 20 F-35As. In September 2017, South Korea confirmed purchase of 40 F-35 fighter jets, causing EADS to withdraw its offer.

=== Postponements and delays ===
The KF-X project had a history of delays and postponements since its announcement in 2001. Foreign partners were sought to share costs and guarantee purchases, and several failed attempts were made to entice Sweden, Turkey, and the United States to join the project. Design concepts and requirements frequently changed while trying to appeal to prospective partners. In March 2013, following the election of President Park Geun-hye, South Korea postponed the project for 18 months, due to financial issues.

In February 2017, Indonesian Vice Minister of Foreign Affairs Abdurrahman Mohammad Fachir said that the KF-X project was further delayed because the US government had refused export licenses for four key F-35 technologies. This disapproval was reaffirmed in October 2015 talks, though the US military stated that there was an agreement to form an interagency working group on such issues and that the US Secretary of Defense would "think of ways for joint cooperation" with technology for KF-X.

In November 2017, state-owned Indonesia Aerospace was overdue in its funding payment, which National Assembly Defense Committee member Kim Jong-Dae said would further delay, or suspend the project. Kim said that the Indonesian government had disclosed its difficulty in paying and did not include the payment in its budget. DAPA stated that it was in talks with Indonesia regarding the payment, which would be discussed at a summit between leaders of the countries. Indonesia stated that it was an administrative error, as it was falsely thought that the payment would be made from the "side defense budget". Parliamentary approval was required to correct the error, and the payment was delivered along with a statement of hope that the program would continue without further delinquencies.

=== Indonesian renegotiation ===
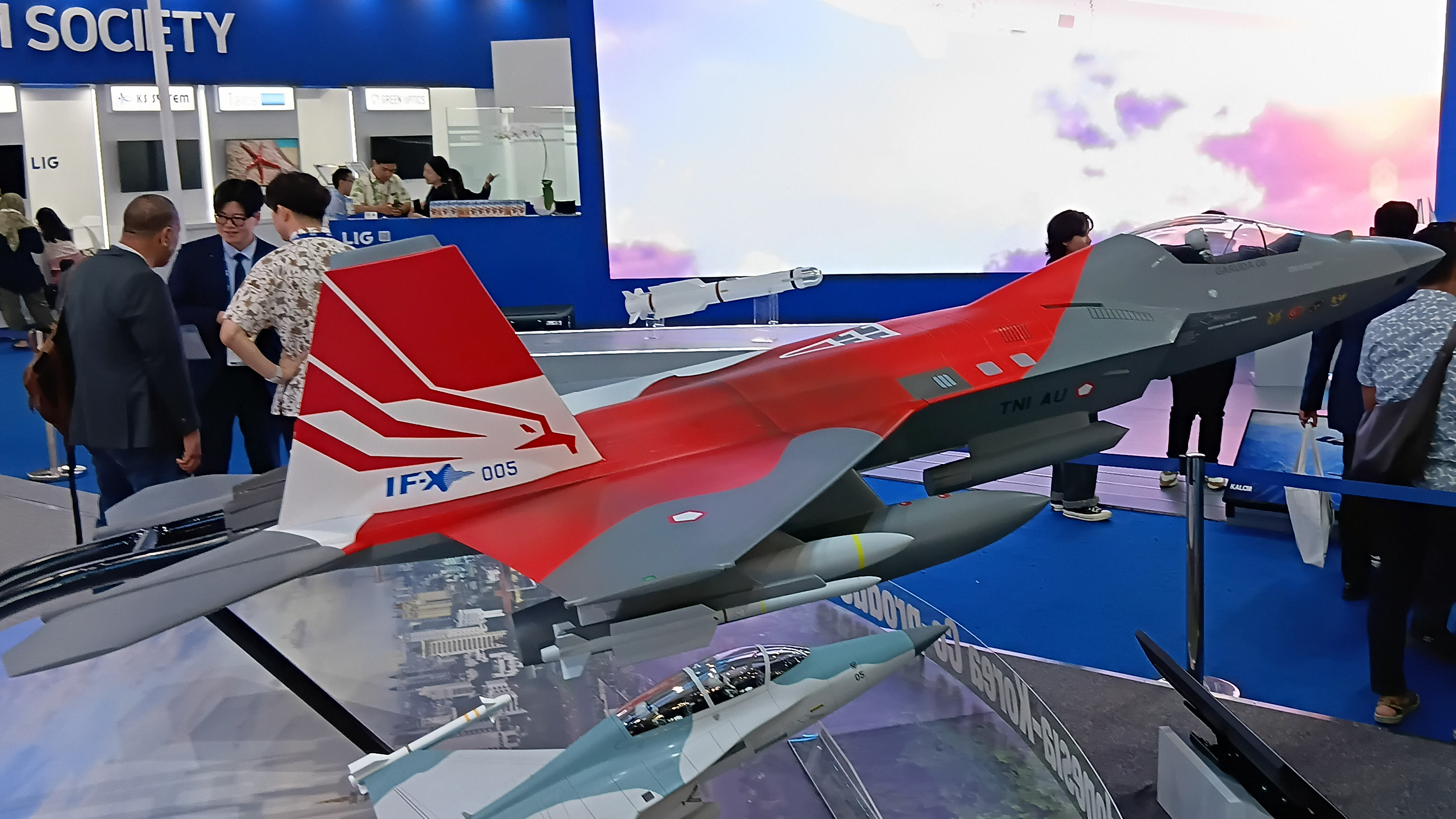
KF-21 scale model in Indonesian Air Force markings at Indo Defence 2024

On 1 May 2018, it was reported that Indonesia had complaints concerning the contract rules surrounding technical benefits and export licensing. Indonesian state media announced that the defense ministry would renegotiate the joint development program in an attempt to gain a larger share of local production, as well as export rights. The Indonesian defense ministry added that it hoped that the program would continue despite setbacks.

Renegotiation talks continued into 2019. According to the agenda of a January 2019 meeting, Indonesia sought to extend its involvement in the program to 2031, and was interested in making part of its payments in trade for Indonesian-produced defense equipment. By August, Indonesia had transport aircraft on offer along with commodities.

In August 2021, Indonesia reaffirmed its commitment to the KF-21 program. Cost negotiations were achieved and agreed by both parties in 2021. In May 2022 it was reported that the issue of development payments had not yet been resolved. In November 2022, it was reported that Indonesia had resumed payment for its share of the costs.

On 13 June 2025, South Korea agreed to reduce Indonesia's contribution to 600 billion won ($439 million) through the signing of a memorandum of understanding at Indo Defence Expo & Forum 2024 in Jakarta. DAPA had also met with Indonesian Minister of Defence Sjafrie Sjamsoeddin to reaffirm the joint partnership, while KAI and Indonesian Aerospace agreed to strengthen practical cooperation in production and marketing for the IF-21 variant.

=== Indonesian engineers' alleged technology theft ===
On 2 February 2024, the South Korean National Intelligence Service (NIS) and the Defense Counterintelligence Command (DCC) announced a joint investigation into whether Indonesian engineers dispatched to KAI violated the Defense Technology Security Act for allegedly attempting to steal classified KF-21 technical data after storing it on an unauthorized USB drive. According to the investigation authorities, on 17 January 2024, an Indonesian engineer was reported to have been caught attempting to take eight USB drives containing 49 confidential data related to KF-21 out of the company, and also included sensitive data of the European and U.S. subcontractors with restricted exports to third countries and avionics only accessible to KAI officials.

On 11 March 2024, the Korean National Police Agency (KNPA), which is investigating the case at the request of DAPA, decided to expand its investigation after circumstantial evidence emerged that another Indonesian engineer was involved in the crime, and an initial investigation result report by NIS and DCC revealed that about 4,000 to 6,600 KF-21 data, including 3D design drawings of the aircraft, were stored on USB drives.

On 15 March 2024, for an in-depth investigation, the security investigation department of the South Gyeongsang Provincial Police Agency dispatched 10 investigators to the Indonesian engineer's home and KAI office to conduct a search and seizure.

South Korea is investigating Indonesian engineers for allegedly attempting to steal classified KF-21 data. The suspects were caught storing information on unauthorized USB devices and are barred from leaving the country. Based on Korean CEO own statement there is no sensitive data on the USB and it is something that is shared with Indonesian team. (edit: the article doesn't confirm this.) Latest development shows that there is no proof on the technology stealing and it is stated by Korean government attorney. KAI CEO Kang Goo-young had hoped that the problem can be amicably resolved as he considered the partnership with Indonesia is still important in order to penetrate other markets such as for ASEAN and Islamic countries.

In late May 2025, South Korean prosecutors concluded their investigation into five Indonesian engineers who had been under scrutiny for allegedly violating the Defense Technology Security Act, the Defense Acquisition Program Act, and the Foreign Trade Act. The prosecutors issued a non-indictment on those charges and granted suspended indictment (기소유예) for alleged violations of the Unfair Competition Prevention Act. A suspended indictment means that while the charges are acknowledged, the prosecutors chose not to proceed with prosecution in light of various mitigating circumstances. The investigation, which had lasted over a year and a half, was effectively concluded with this decision.

Maeil Business Newspaper reported on 2 June 2025 that the five Indonesian engineers who were accused had been acquitted and suspended from prosecution. The Indonesian Ministry of Foreign Affairs has reported that the 5 engineers are now home in good health and gathered with their families. However, the accusation along with uncertainties of Indonesian payment has strained relationship between both countries. South Korean media questioned Indonesia's commitment, even if the allegations are false and urged the South Korean government to get rid of Indonesia from the program itself. On the other side, Indonesian defense experts also questioned the government's commitment towards the project.

Fresh tensions between Indonesia and South Korea over the KF-21 erupted again as Indonesia renewed diplomatic relations with North Korea, including initiating high-level visits and trade discussions. This prompted South Korean analysts to warn the government to beware of potential technological leaks that may occur in such third-party channels despite no strong evidence that Pyongyang sought after this technology. DAPA brushed off this concern as the technology remains protected through a nondisclosure agreement with Indonesia.

=== Indonesian Aerospace - Korea Aerospace Industry ICA ===
In June 2026, Indonesia’s Ministry of Defense stated that Indonesia would no longer pursue joint production of the KF-21 with South Korea and would instead seek to acquire the aircraft through direct purchase. Under the revised arrangement, Indonesia was expected to retain a more limited role focused on procurement, evaluation, and possible sustainment-related cooperation.

Indonesian Defense Ministry official never said that co-production of KF21 with PTDI has been cancelled, he only said that the possible initial 16 KF21 order will be direct order from Korea and no final assembly in PTDI This doesnt mean there is no co-production with PTDI as PTDI (Indonesian Aerospace) Vice President of Business Development, Heber MF Panjaitan stated that PTDI has secured an Industrial Collaboration Agreement (ICA) with Korea Aerospace Industry to manufacture 15% of the KF21 airframe for aircraft intended for Indonesian Aerospace.

== Potential sales ==
=== Egypt ===
According to Korea Aerospace Industries (KAI), Egypt has shown interest in acquiring the FA-50 light combat aircraft and the newly developed KF-21 Boramae fighter jet.

=== Indonesia ===
In 2016, Indonesia agreed to contribute approximately $1.25 billion (1.7 trillion won), representing 20% of the KF-21 development costs. 2017 was the last year Indonesia made a payment for several years. From January 2019 to November 2022, payments are halted by Indonesia. In November 2022, a payment is resumed.

In February 2023, another payment is made. At this point, reports state Indonesia still owes more than 1.1 trillion won, having paid only 280 billion won. In June 2023, Indonesia failed to provide a payment schedule as promised. In October 2023, Indonesia failed again to provide a payment schedule.

In August 2024, South Korea agreed to reduce Indonesia's financial contribution to 600 billion won (about $443 million) due to its persistent payment difficulties. On 10 June 2025, South Korea and Indonesia finalized an agreement that revised Indonesia's financial contribution to the KF-21 project. Out of the total project cost of 8.1 trillion won (approximately $5.9 billion), the updated contract reduces Indonesia's share from 1.6 trillion won (approximately $1.168 billion, or 20% of the total) to 600 billion won (approximately $438 million, or 7.4%). The agreement reaffirmed Indonesia's planned purchase of 48 aircraft and the continued participation of PT DI in their production.

In January 2026, Janes reported that Indonesia is interested in purchasing sixteen KF-21 Block II.

The Indonesian Government has officially ended its role as a co-development partner in the KF-21 Boramae fighter aircraft programme with South Korea. Instead of participating in joint production, Indonesia will now acquire the aircraft through a direct procurement arrangement. Previously, on 25 June 2026, Indonesia fulfilled its revised financial commitment by paying 600 billion won (approximately IDR 6.9 trillion).

=== Malaysia ===
The Royal Malaysian Air Force (RMAF) is reportedly considering Russia's Sukhoi Su-57 (NATO: Felon) and the KF-21 Boramae for its Multi-Role Combat Aircraft (MRCA) program.

On 17–18 February 2025, RMAF Chief of Air Force, General Tan Sri Dato' Sri Mohd Asghar Khan Goriman Khan, visited KAI in South Korea. During the visit, he inspected the FA-50 production line and the KF-21 Boramae.

=== Peru ===
Aiming for Peru's fighter jet contract, KAI signed a Memorandum of Understanding (MoU) with the Peruvian Air Force Maintenance Service (SEMAN) to manufacture KF-21 'Boramae' fighter jet components in Peru.

=== Philippines ===
On 16 August 2022, Philippine Air Force (PAF) spokesperson Col. Maynard Mariano confirmed that the KF-21 is being considered as a potential contender for the PAF's future multi-role fighter (MRF) project. In a message to the Philippine News Agency (PNA), he noted that the KF-21, which is "stealthier than any fourth-generation fighter," is a "possibility given that the MRF project has not been funded yet" and the aircraft is still undergoing development and flight testing.

In 2024, the Philippines announced its interest to purchase 40 jet fighters. The Gripen E/F and the F-16 Block 70/72 were pre-selected and South Korea joined the bid in September 2024 with 10 KF-21 Block I with deliveries ahead of ROK Air Force, 12 FA-50 Block 20 (Block 70), and upgrade of 11 existing FA-50PH to Block 20 (Block 70) standard.

On 1 December 2025, The Philippine Star reported that KAI was in talks with the Department of National Defense and the PAF regarding a possible acquisition of KF-21. The report noted that the discussions also included the potential establishment of a maintenance, repair and overhaul (MRO) facility in the Philippines if a sufficient number of aircraft were procured.

In June 2026, Global Economic News reported that South Korea and Korea Aerospace Industries (KAI) were in final negotiations with the Philippine Air Force for the possible acquisition of up to 20 KF‑21 Boramae fighters, supported by a financing package in which 70% of the project—valued at roughly ₩3 trillion—would be covered through KEXIM loans; the report also noted that the proposal includes establishing a joint MRO facility at Clark Air Base and leverages the Philippines’ existing FA‑50PH fleet, which analysts say creates a strong “lock‑in” effect toward adopting the KF‑21.

=== Poland ===
In July 2022, the Polish Armaments Agency said it is closely watching the development of the KF-21 Boramae, potentially paving a way for the purchase of the future Block 2 version of the fighter jet for the Polish Air Force. Polish defense company Polska Grupa Zbrojeniowa (PGZ) is reportedly keen to join the KF-21 fighter program, with a letter of intent expected to be issued soon, according to South Korean broadcaster MBC.

In June 2025, a delegation from the Polish Air Force visited South Korea to inspect the production facilities of the FA-50 light combat aircraft. During the visit, the delegation also evaluated the KF-21 Boramae. Brigadier General Ireneusz Nowak, Inspector of the Polish Air Force, conducted a demonstration flight in the KF-21, as confirmed by KAI. The KF-21 is currently being offered to the Polish Air Force, which has expressed interest in acquiring an additional 32 multirole fighters to strengthen its combat capabilities.

=== Saudi Arabia ===
On 30 January 2024, a South Korean Ministry of Defense official stated that senior representatives from the ministry and the ADD made an unannounced visit to Saudi Arabia from 23 to 26 January. During the visit, the South Korean delegation met with Saudi Arabia's Deputy Defense Minister, Dr. Khalid bin Hussein Al-Biyari, and other officials to discuss the potential joint development of a 5th or 6th generation multi-role fighter based on the KAI KF-21 Boramae design. On 9 February 2025, an image from a presentation by KAI officials to Saudi Arabia regarding the KF-21 fighter jet briefly appeared on social media before being taken down.

On 29 July 2025, Royal Saudi Air Force Commander Lieutenant General Turki bin Bandar bin Abdulaziz met with South Korean Air Force Chief of Staff General Lee Young-soo. The two discussed military cooperation and topics of mutual interest, including potential Saudi involvement in the KF-21 Boramae fighter jet project. On 14 August 2025, officials from Saudi military company SAMI Aerospace held a meeting with the Chief of Staff of the Republic of Korea Air Force to talk about boosting their partnership in the aviation sector.

On January 28, 2026, a high-level delegation led by Prince Turki bin Bandar bin Abdulaziz Al Saud, Commander of the Royal Saudi Air Force (RSAF), visited the Korea Aerospace Industries (KAI) headquarters in Sacheon to discuss strategic cooperation in the aerospace and defense sectors. The visit focused on the potential role of the KF-21 Boramae in Saudi Arabia's air force modernization efforts. During the visit, RSAF officials reviewed KAI's production facilities, MRO (Maintenance, Repair, and Overhaul) capabilities, and the KF-21's Next-Generation Air Combat System (NACS) roadmap. KAI emphasized the aircraft's operational flexibility and its alignment with Saudi Vision 2030, proposing an integrated business model that includes local industrial participation.

=== United Arab Emirates ===
To strengthen its position in developing and exporting next-generation combat aircraft, South Korea has proposed joint development of the KF-21 and its successor to countries in Southeast Asia and the Middle East, with a particular focus on the UAE and Saudi Arabia. On 15 May 2024, senior air force officials from South Korea and the UAE signed a letter of intent for comprehensive cooperation on the KF-21 Boramae. The agreement was signed by South Korean Air Force Chief of Staff General Lee Young-su and UAE Air Force and Air Defence Commander Major General Rashed Mohammed Al-Shamsi.

In April 2025, the UAE Air Force and Air Defence, and the RoKAF signed a letter of intent to further the cooperation on the programme. On 7 July 2025, a friendship flight took place at Sacheon Air Base in Gyeongnam, South Korea, involving high-ranking officials from both the Republic of Korea Air Force and the United Arab Emirates. ROKAF Chief of Staff General Lee Young-su piloted an FA-50 fighter jet, while UAE Assistant Undersecretary of the Ministry of Defense, Ibrahim Nasser Mohamed Al Alawi, flew in a prototype of the KF-21 Boramae fighter.

On August 28 it was reported that the UAE was considering a major strategic investment of approximately 22 trillion KRW (US$15 billion) into the KF-21 program. This move is seen as a strategic effort to enhance defense sovereignty and secure advanced aeronautical technology through joint development and local production. If finalized, the investment would provide the necessary capital for the development of future iterations—including the Block III variant and the expansion of the domestic defense ecosystem. High-ranking UAE defense officials have engaged in direct consultations and participated in flight demonstrations, signaling the potential for the KF-21 to serve as a cornerstone of the UAE's future aerial combat fleet.

== Variants ==
=== Current variants ===
- KF-21 Block I: The Block I focuses on the air-superiority capabilities, though it is reported to include some air-to-ground functionality as well. Scheduled for deployment in 2026.
- KF-21 Block II: With further development for the Block II, the KF-21 will evolve into a swing-role fighter, incorporating attack and reconnaissance capabilities. It shares the same airframe as Block I, requiring only additional integration for expanded armament. Block I aircraft can be upgraded via software updates. Scheduled for deployment in 2028. Blocks I and II are designed to function as advanced 4.5+ generation fighters, offering greater survivability through reduced radar cross-section (RCS), more sophisticated avionics, and relatively cost-effective performance compared to alternative platforms in their class.

=== Potential variants ===
- KF-21 Block III (project name: KF-XX): Block III will be developed as a 5.5+ generation fighter jet, featuring internal weapons bays, enhanced stealth through radar-absorbent materials, and upgraded AESA radar with next-gen avionics. It will support unmanned teaming, network-centric warfare, and improved situational awareness. A domestically developed Korean engine is also planned to replace the current F414-GE-400, reducing foreign dependence. Block III aims to combine high-end performance, survivability, and cost-effectiveness in a competitive fifth-generation platform.
  - KF-21EJ: One of the three new variants revealed in June 2024. Will serve as an electronic warfare aircraft / escort jammer comparable to the EA-18G Growler. This variant would be based on the two-seat KF-21, incorporating a dedicated station for an Electronic Warfare Officer (EWO) to manage complex electromagnetic environments. The KF-21EJ will be designed to perform a critical escort role, utilising its advanced jamming suite to suppress enemy air defences and degrade hostile radar systems. By creating a 'protective bubble' of electromagnetic interference, it will secure safe corridors for friendly fighter and bomber formations, significantly increasing their survivability during high-threat deep-strike missions.
  - KF-21EX: The KF-21EX is a planned advanced variant of the KF-21 Boramae that aims to significantly enhance the jet's strike capability, survivability, and operational effectiveness, particularly within a manned-unmanned teaming (MUM-T) construct. The most significant structural change in this upgraded version is the addition of an internal weapons bay, which allows the aircraft to carry munitions such as the GBU-31 Joint Direct Attack Munition (JDAM) and MBDA Meteor missiles without increasing its radar cross-section. This capability brings the KF-21EX to the strike power of fifth-generation fighters like the F-35. The aircraft will also receive several stealth-focused upgrades, including a reprofiled canopy, low-RCS radome, and new conformal antennas, to improve its survivability against radar threats. In its MUM-T role, the KF-21EX will serve as a manned command platform, working alongside future autonomous drones that will act as stand-in jammers to suppress enemy air defenses. To support this, the fighter will feature enhanced avionics, including an Electro-Optical Targeting System (EOTS), Distributed Apature System (DAS), an upgraded electronic warfare suite, and potentially an AI-enabled mission computer and expendable decoys.
  - KF-21SA: One of the three new variants revealed in June 2024. Will reportedly be a variant specifically dedicated to the export market, with opportunities for the client to modify the aircraft. Specifically, the KF-21SA will offer tailored configurations to suit a customer's specific environmental conditions, including optimized cooling systems for high-temperature climates and specialized anti-corrosion/anti-humid coatings for maritime or tropical operations. To further appeal to international buyers, the variant will support the integration of locally produced armaments and indigenous mission equipment, ensuring compatibility with the purchasing nation's existing defense infrastructure.
- KF-21N: In September 2022, KAI unveiled a model of the KF-21N, a carrier-based version of the fighter. In May 2022, the Ministry of National Defense (MND) decided to drop funding for the CVX, a planned small aircraft carrier capable of operating STOVL F-35B jets. It was later clarified that the MND would consider purchasing a larger aircraft carrier design, if a maritime jet fighter could be developed indigenously. Anticipating this, KAI began a preliminary design concept to make the KF-21 carrier-capable. The wings were 20% larger to ensure safety and stabilization when taking off and landing, and could fold for more compact storage. Structural changes would make the airframe capable of CATOBAR and STOBAR operations. KAI claimed it would be able to build the KF-21N "in a few years" if the Republic of Korea Navy (ROKN) decided to procure an aircraft carrier large enough to operate fighters, but they instead decided to build a ship focused on controlling unmanned vehicles rather than carrying manned fighters.
- KF-21B: A variant planned for the ROKAF Black Eagles aerobatic team as a high-performance successor to the aging T-50B, with a projected transition beginning around 2028. This variant is strategically vital for the team's international operations because it features built-in aerial refueling capabilities—a critical upgrade that resolves the range limitations of the current fleet and allows for seamless global deployment without relying on diplomatic stopovers for ground refueling.

== Operators ==
=== Current operators ===
South Korea

Republic of Korea Air Force

- 16th Fighter Wing
  - 156th Fighter Squadron
- Air Force Test & Evaluation Wing – 6 prototypes (four single-seat and two twin-seat)

=== Future operators ===
South Korea

Republic of Korea Air Force

- 18th Fighter Wing
  - 20 KF-21 Block I ordered in June 2024 for a value of US$1.41 billion. The serial production started in July 2024.
  - 20 additional KF-21 Block I ordered in June 2025. The delivery of 40 units of KF-21 Block I will began in September 2026 and be completed by 2028.
  - 80 KF-21 Block II are planned to be ordered and delivered by 2032.

=== Summary ===
Operators	Orders	Acquisition			Losses	In service	Notes
Operators	Orders	KF-21 Block I	KF-21 Block II	KF-21EX	Losses	In service	Notes
(South Korea) Republic of Korea Air Force	40 (+80)	2 (+38)	(+80)	-	0	0	Batch I: 20 KF-21 Block I ordered. Batch II: 20 KF-21 Block I ordered. Batch III: 80 KF-21 Block II planned.
Total	40	2	0	0	0	0	
Total	40	Total acquired: 2 To be manufactured: 38			0	0	

Legend of the coloured numbers in the table:

Systems assembled and produced in South Korea
Systems assembled or produced outside of South Korea
2nd hand sold/transferred [ – ] and bought/received [ + ]
System upgraded, one variant to the other [ – ] / [ + ]

== Specifications (single seat aircraft) ==
Data from Korea Aerospace Industries, Hanwha Systems and LIG Nex1

General characteristics

- Crew: 1 or 2
- Length: 16.9 m (55 ft 4 in)
- Wingspan: 11.2 m (36 ft 7 in)
- Height: 4.7 m (15 ft 4 in)
- Wing area: 46.5 m^{2} (501 sq ft)
- Empty weight: 11,800 kg (26,015 lb)
- Gross weight: 17,200 kg (37,920 lb)
- Max takeoff weight: 25,600 kg (56,400 lb)
- Fuel capacity: 6,000 kg (13,227 lb) internal
- Payload: 7,700 kg (17,000 lb) external
- Powerplant: 2 × General Electric F414-GE-400K (manufactured under license by Hanwha Aerospace) turbofan, 57.8 kN (13,000 lbf) thrust each dry, 97.9 kN (22,000 lbf) with afterburner

Performance

- Maximum speed: 2,200 km/h (1,400 mph, 1,200 kn)
- Maximum speed: Mach 1.81
- Combat range: 1,000 km (620 mi, 540 nmi) (estimated)
- Ferry range: 2,900 km (1,800 mi, 1,550 nmi)
- g limits: +9.0

Armament

- Guns: 1× 20 mm M61A2 Vulcan rotary autocannon, 480 rounds
- Hardpoints: 10 (6 under-wing hardpoints and 4 under-fuselage hardpoints)
- Missiles:
  - Air-to-air missiles:
    - Meteor
    - IRIS-T
    - LRAAM (Long-Range Air-to-Air Missile, In development)
    - SRAAM (Short-Range Air-to-Air Missile, in development)
    - AIM-120 AMRAAM (Approved)
    - AIM-9X Sidewinder (Approved)
  - Air-to-surface missiles:
    - KALCM Cheonryong (Block 2, in development)
  - Anti-ship missiles:
    - Korean Hypersonic anti-ship missile (In development)
- Bombs:
  - GBU-12 Paveway II (Block 2)
  - GBU-31 Joint Direct Attack Munition (Block 2)
  - GBU-38 Joint Direct Attack Munition (Block 2)
  - GBU-39 Small Diameter Bomb (Block 2)
  - GBU-54 Joint Direct Attack Munition (Block 2)
  - GBU-56 Joint Direct Attack Munition (Block 2)
  - KGGB (Block 2)
  - Mark 82 bomb (Block 2)
  - Mark 84 bomb (Block 2)

Avionics

- APY-016K Active Electronically Scanned Array (AESA) radar
- Hanwha Systems Electro-Optical Targeting Pod (EO TGP)
- Skyward-K Infra-Red Search and Track (IRST) system
- Flight Control Computer (FCC)
- ARINC 653 Mission Computer (MC)
- Stores Management Computer (SMC)
- Head-up display (HUD)
- ARINC 818 Multi-Function Display (MFD)
- Nex electronic warfare suite (EWS) includes:
  - Electronic Warfare Computer (EWC)
  - Radar warning receiver (RWR)
  - Radio frequency jammer
  - Counter Measures Dispenser System (CMDS)
- Audio Communication Control System (ACCS)
- AN/ARC-232A U/VHF-AM Radio
- Flight Data Recorder (FDR)
- Radar altimeter (RALT)

== See also ==
- Fifth-generation fighter
- Lockheed Martin F-22 Raptor
- Lockheed Martin F-35 Lightning II
- Chengdu J-20
- Shenyang J-35
- Sukhoi Su-57
- TAI TF Kaan

Aircraft of comparable role, configuration, and era

- Chengdu J-10C
- Boeing F-15EX Eagle II
- Dassault Rafale
- Eurofighter Typhoon
- Lockheed Martin F-16V Viper
- Shenyang J-15T
- Shenyang J-16
- Sukhoi Su-35
