= APY-016K =

KF-21 Boramae fire-control radar

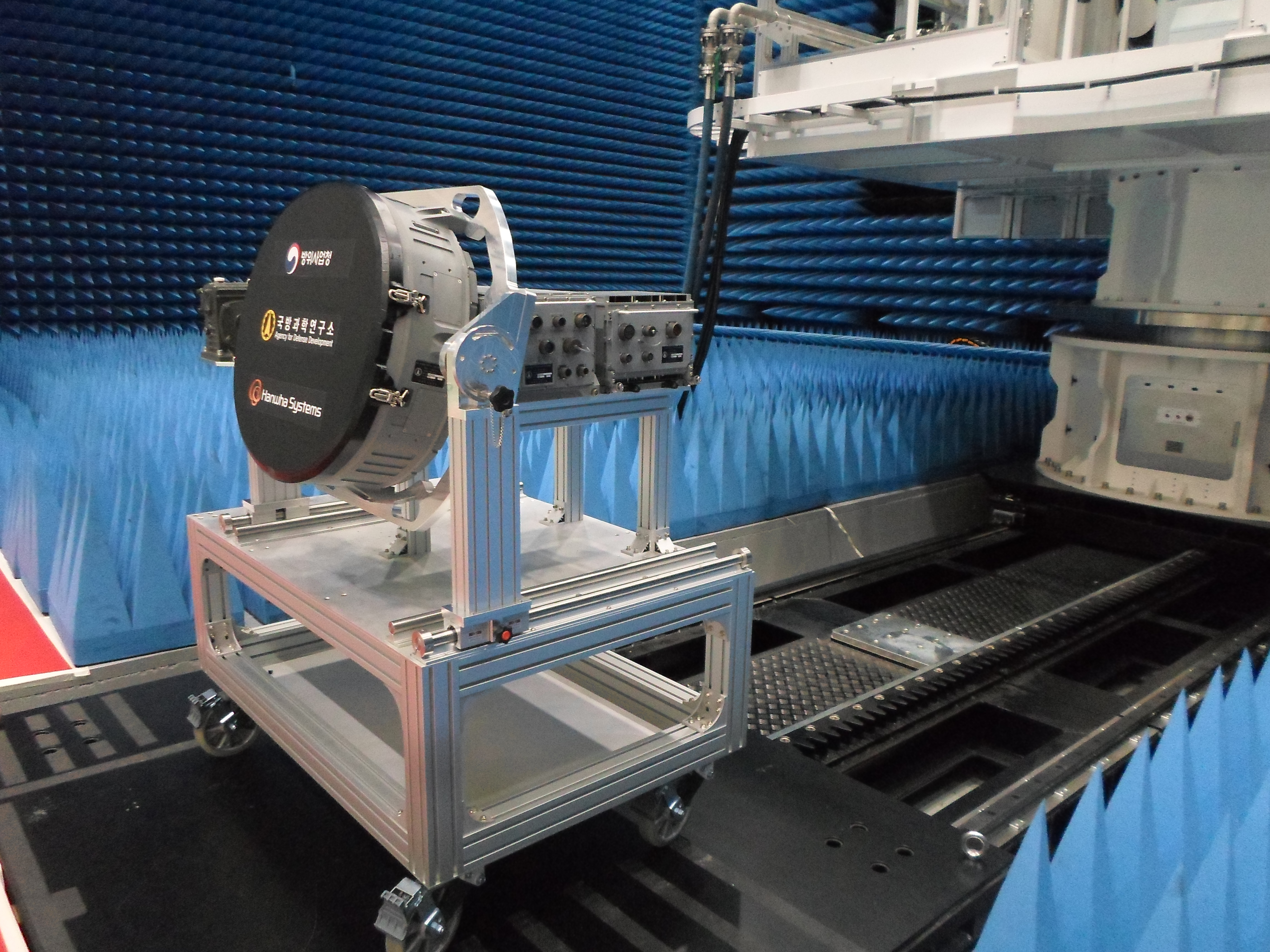
- Hanwha Systems APY-016K AESA radar in Compact Antenna Test Range (CATR) in 2020
- Country of origin: South Korea
- Manufacturer: Hanwha Systems (final assembly); Broadern (transmit/receive module)
- Designer: Agency for Defense Development (antenna unit); Hanwha Systems (processor unit)
- Introduced: 2020
- Type: Solid-state AESA fire-control radar
- Frequency: X-band; 8–12 GHz (3.7–2.5 cm)
- Beamwidth: 120° (horizontal), 120° (vertical)
- Pulsewidth: <200 µs (maximum)
- Range: >200 km (120 mi)
- Other names: KF-X AESA Radar

The APY-016K is a gallium nitride (GaN) based active electronically scanned array (AESA) fire-control radar designed by Agency for Defense Development (ADD) and Hanwha Systems for the KAI KF-21 Boramae fighter aircraft. The early prototype was developed with 1,400 transmit/receive modules (TRM) with 14 kW of power, but by the time of the later prototype, the design had been changed to an antenna unit with 1,152 TRMs.

The development program was conducted from August 2016 to August 2020 and has been produced by Hanwha Systems since August 2025.

== Design ==
The APY-016K has air-to-air, air-to-ground detection and tracking capabilities, as well as synthetic-aperture radar (SAR) and terrain-following radar (TFR) modes, and interleaved modes to operate two different modes simultaneously. The antenna units operated at the X-band frequency are composed to a total of 1,152 transmit/receive modules (TRM).

=== Transmit/receive module ===
One transmit/receive module is assembled with one compact brick-type radiating element in the form of a square 4 millimeters wide. The module system is also applied with solid-state power amplifier (SSPA), high-speed signal processing, low-noise amplifier (LNA), and 6-bit phase shift technology.

- Operating frequency: X-band (8–12 GHz)
- Tx gain: >36 dB
- Rx gain: >26 dB
- Noise figure: <4.5 dB
- Input P1dB Rx: <37 dBm (maximum)
- Pulse width: <200 µs (maximum)
- Duty cycle: 15%
- Rise time: <100 µs
- Communication interface: Parallel RS-422

== Radar modes ==
The radar system has two air-to-air and air-to-ground main modes, each of which is operated in a selective sub-mode.

Main mode	Submode	Operational interleaved mode
Air-to-air	Search while track (SWT)	SAR/TFR
Air-to-air	High priority precision track (HPPT)	SAR/TFR
Air-to-air	Raid assessment (RA)	SAR/TFR
Air-to-air	Air combat maneuvering (ACM)	TFR
Air-to-ground	Real beam ground map (RBGM)	SAR/TFR
Air-to-ground	Doppler beam sharpening (DBS)	SAR/TFR
Air-to-ground	Ground moving target indication (GMTI)	SAR/TFR
Air-to-ground	Ground moving target track (GMTT)	SAR/TFR
Air-to-ground	Air-to-ground ranging (AGR)	SAR/TFR
Air-to-ground	Sea surface search (SSS)	SAR/TFR
Air-to-ground	Sea moving target track (SMTT)	SAR/TFR

== See also ==
- List of radars
