= Long-Range Hypersonic Weapon =

U.S. Army prototype missile

Long-Range Hypersonic Weapon (LRHW)
- Long-Range Hypersonic Weapon deployed to Cape Canaveral for testing
- Place of origin: United States

Service history
- In service: 2023–present
- Used by: United States Army; United States Navy (planned)

Production history
- Manufacturer: Lockheed Martin
- Unit cost: $41 million

Specifications
- Mass: 16,300 lb (7,400 kg)
- Diameter: 34.5 in (0.88 m) (reportedly)
- Operational range: 2,175 mi (3,500 km)
- Maximum speed: Mach ≥5

The Long-Range Hypersonic Weapon (LRHW), also known as the Dark Eagle, is an intermediate-range surface-to-surface boost-glide hypersonic weapon being developed for use by the United States Army. The United States Navy intends to procure a ship/submarine-launched variant of the missile as part of the service's Intermediate-Range Conventional Prompt Strike (IRCPS) program. The weapon consists of a large two-stage rocket booster that carries the unpowered Common-Hypersonic Glide Body (C-HGB) in a nose cone. Once the booster reaches significant altitude and speed, it releases the C-HGB, which glides at hypersonic speeds as it descends towards its target. Dynetics will build the hypersonic glide vehicle, while Lockheed Martin will build the booster as well as assemble the missile and launch equipment.

The C-HGB has been successfully tested in October 2017, March 2020, 28 June 2024, and 12 December 2024. The missile had been planned to enter service with the Army in 2023. The Navy intends to field the weapon aboard its Zumwalt-class destroyers by 2025 and later on its Block V Virginia-class submarines in 2028; it was intended to also be fielded on guided missile variants of the Ohio-class ballistic missile submarines, but funding delays and the boats' impending retirement caused those plans to be scrapped.

== Development and testing ==
=== Common-Hypersonic Glide Body ===
In 2018, the Navy was designated to lead the design of the Common-Hypersonic Glide Body with input from the Army's Rapid Capabilities and Critical Technologies Office.

==== Design ====
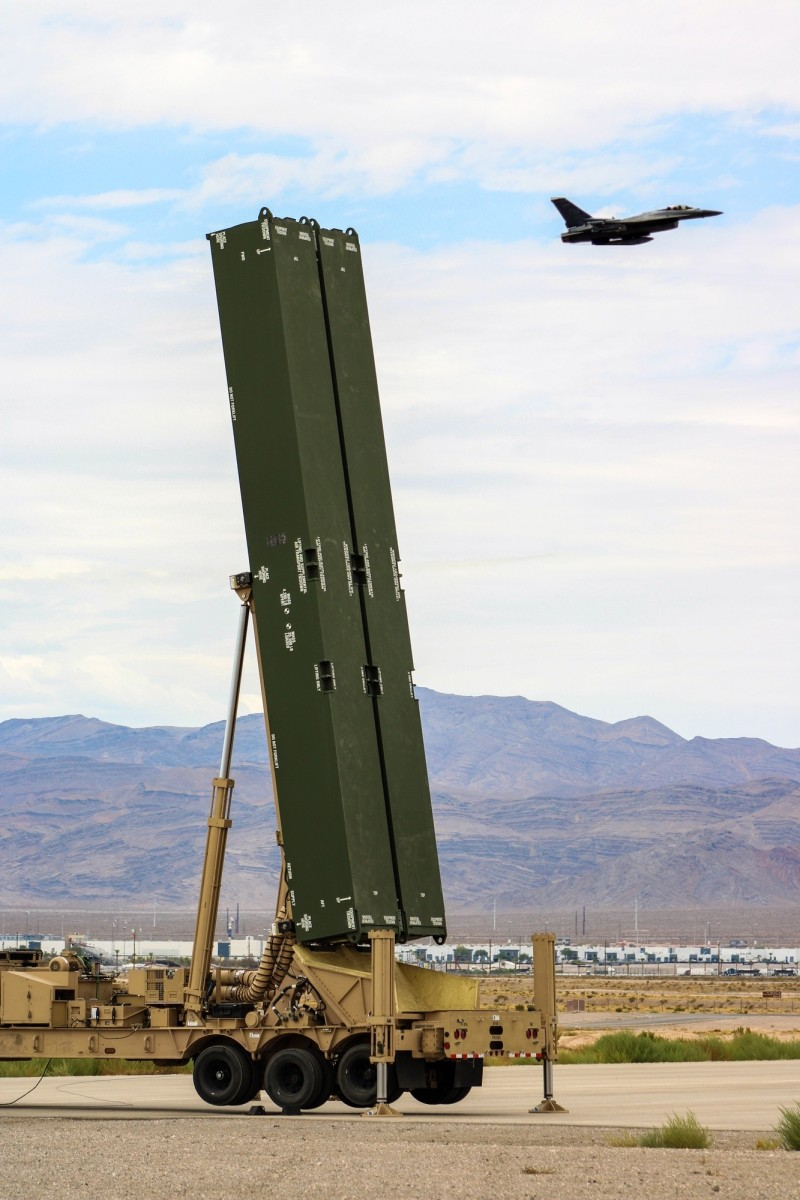
LRHW on transporter erector launcher, 3 August 2024, Exercise Bamboo Eagle 24-3, Nellis AFB

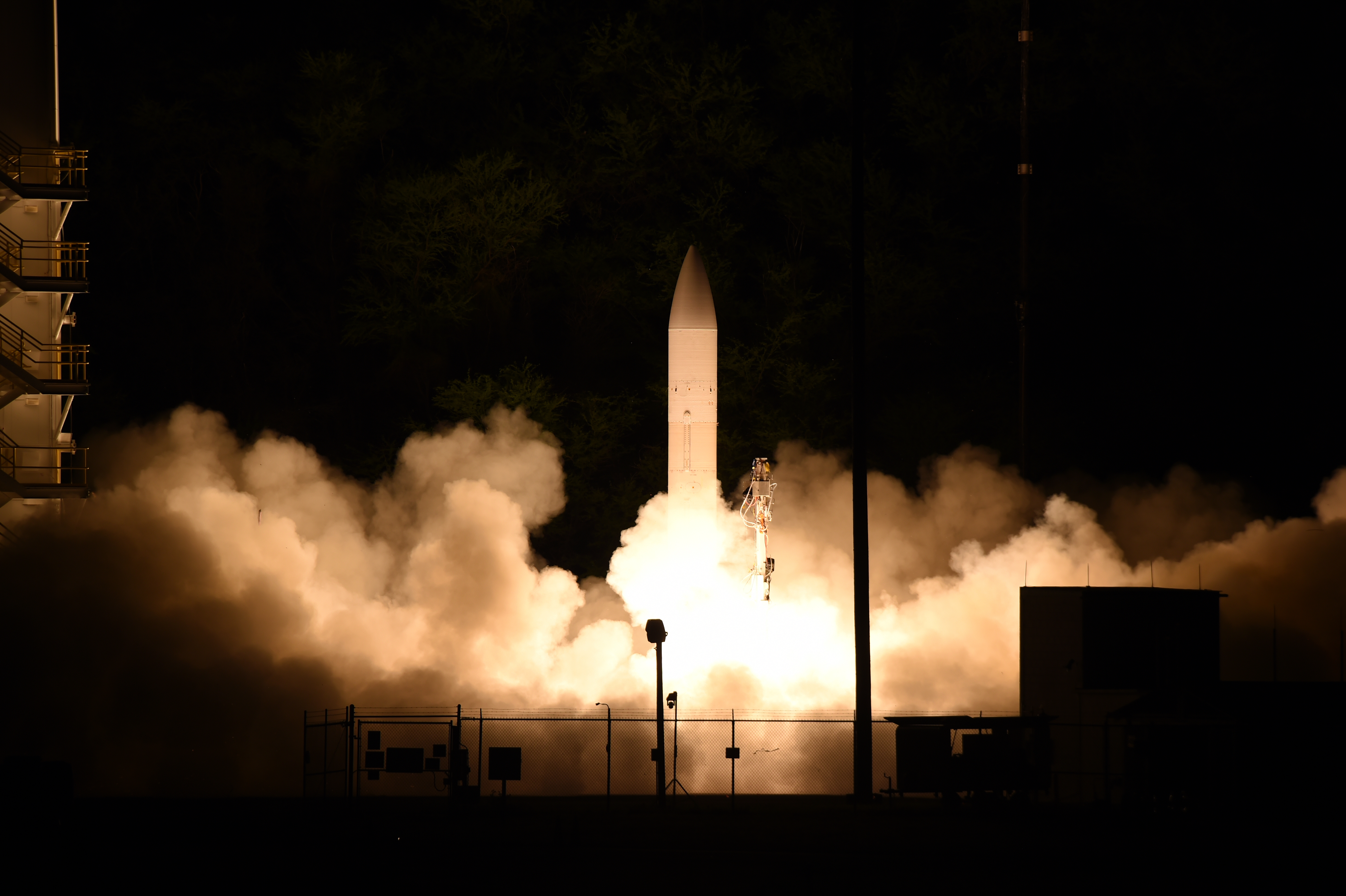
A 2020 test launch of a STARS booster carrying a prototype of the Common-Hypersonic Glide Body

The design of the Common-Hypersonic Glide Body with a kinetic energy projectile warhead is based on the previously developed Alternate Re-Entry System, which was tested in the early 2010s as part of the Army's Advanced Hypersonic Weapon program. The Alternate Re-Entry System was itself based on the Sandia Winged Energetic Reentry Vehicle Experiment (SWERVE) prototype developed by Sandia National Laboratories in the 1980s. Design work is by Sandia, while Dynetics constructs prototypes and test units.

==== Testing ====
The first test of the Intermediate Range Conventional Prompt Strike Flight Experiment-1, was on 30 October 2017. A missile capable of fitting in the launch tube of an Ohio-class ballistic missile submarine flew over 2,000 nautical miles from Hawaii to the Marshall Islands at hypersonic speeds. The Common-Hypersonic Glide Body was tested in March 2020. LRHW subsystems were tested at Project Convergence 2022 (PC22).

On 28 June 2024, the Department of Defense announced a successful recent end-to-end test of the US Army's Long-Range Hypersonic Weapon all-up round (AUR) and the US Navy's Conventional Prompt Strike. The missile was launched from the Pacific Missile Range Facility, Kauai, Hawaii, landing more than 2000 miles away in the Marshall Islands. A second 2024 test of the land-based launcher fired an all-up round (AUR) from a transporter erector launcher (TEL) using a Battery Operations Center at Cape Canaveral on 12 December 2024, which was successful.

=== Boosters ===
The first stage solid rocket motor was tested on 27 May 2020.

Both stages of the missile booster as well as a thrust vector control system were tested in 2021.

On 29 October 2021, the booster rocket for the Long-Range Hypersonic Weapon was successfully tested in a static test in Utah; the first stage thrust vector control system was included in the test.

In March 2021, training with inert missile canisters began. On 7 October 2021, 17th Field Artillery Brigade of the I Corps received ground equipment for the first operational LRHW battery.

In June 2022 in Hawaii, a launch failure of Conventional Prompt Strike occurred after ignition. The test of a completely assembled CPS weapon, which uses a two-stage booster, failed before ignition of the C-HGB. Conventional Prompt Strike was successfully tested 12 December 2024.

== Entry into service ==
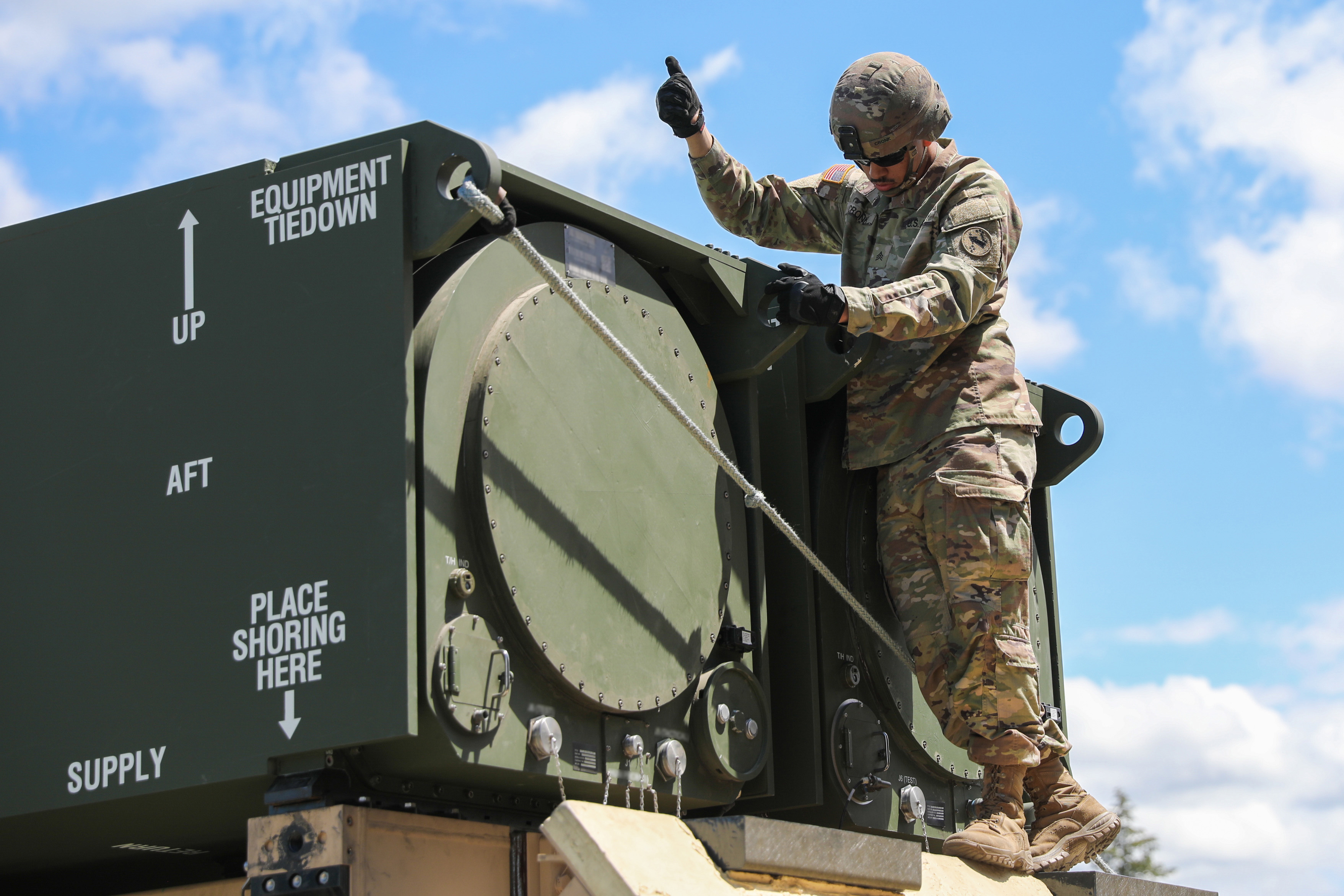
LRHW placed on transporter erector launcher

The United States Army intends to deploy the Long-Range Hypersonic Weapon in an eight missile battery containing four M983 trucks and trailers each holding two missiles in launch canisters alongside a command vehicle. The LRHW has been also named Dark Eagle by the US Army.

In February 2023, the 5th Battalion, 3rd Field Artillery Regiment (5-3 LRFB)—1st MDTF's long-range fires battalion—deployed the LRHW from Joint Base Lewis-McChord, Tacoma, Washington to Cape Canaveral, Florida. The first battery of missiles was expected to be deployed by end of September 2023.

On 7 September 2023, a test launch of the LRHW system was canceled due to an unspecified failure of pre-flight checks. United States Assistant Secretary of the Army for Acquisition, Logistics, and Technology Douglas R. Bush revealed that the launcher had a "mechanical engineering problem", and that a new plan was in place to correct and test it. An LRHW all-up round was successfully tested sometime prior to 28 June 2024.

On 12 December 2024, the Army and the Navy announced that the Dark Eagle had completed a successful end-to-end flight test at Space Launch Complex 46 at Cape Canaveral.

On 29 April 2026, the US Central Command requested that the Dark Eagle be sent to the Middle East for potential deployment against Iran during the 2026 Iran war, marking the first time Washington would deploy the technology, according to Bloomberg. According to a person with direct knowledge of the issue, US CENTCOM made the request after Iran moved its missile launchers out of range of the US Army's Precision Strike Missile, the current technology it has deployed.

== See also ==
- OpFires – another Lockheed Martin boost glide medium-range system
- AGM-183 ARRW
- Hypersonic Attack Cruise Missile (HACM)
- Hypersonic flight
- Prompt Global Strike/Conventional Prompt Strike
