= Mako (missile) =

- The Lockheed Martin Mako missile, as displayed at Sea Air Space Expo 2024.
- Type: Hypersonic anti-ship missile
- Place of origin: United States

Production history
- Manufacturer: Lockheed Martin Missiles and Fire Control

Specifications
- Mass: 1,300 lb (590 kg)
- Length: 13 ft (4.0 m)
- Diameter: 13 in (33 cm)
- Warhead: 130 lb (59 kg)
- Propellant: Solid-rocket motor
- Maximum speed: Mach 5+ (planned)
- Launch platform: F/A-18E/F Super Hornet, EA-18G Growler, F-16, F-15, F-35A/B/C, F-22, P-8A Poseidon, surface ships and submarines (via VLS)

The Mako Multi-Mission Hypersonic Missile is a hypersonic missile developed by Lockheed Martin and CoAspire, specifically designed to fit in the internal weapons bay of the F-35A/C and F-22A. It is the first hypersonic weapon compatible with a fifth-generation fighter. The missile was unveiled in April 2024 at the Navy League’s Sea Air Space exposition in Maryland, with Lockheed Martin pitching it to both the U.S. Navy and Air Force. It has also been considered for deployment on submarines and surface warships.

== Development ==
Development work on the Mako began in 2017. Originally planned for the Air Force's Stand-in Attack Weapon (SiAW) program, the Mako reflects a strategic shift towards more affordable, yet effective hypersonic strike weapons. Unlike larger hypersonic cruise missiles, the Mako offers a degree of standoff range and rapid response capabilities, making it suitable for a variety of military operations that require a shorter range than the Hypersonic Air Launched Offensive Anti-Surface (HALO) missile — which is optimized for anti-ship missions – or the much larger AGM-183A Air-Launched Rapid Response Weapon (ARRW).

The Mako missile is 13 feet (4.0 m) long, 13 inches (33 cm) in diameter and weighs 1,300 pounds (590 kg), including a 130–pound (59 kg) warhead. It is powered by a solid-fuel rocket motor and is capable of achieving hypersonic speeds of at least Mach 5, though more specific details about its flight profile have not been disclosed. According to Rick Loy, Senior Program Manager for the Missile and Fire Control division at Lockheed Martin, the Mako is “compatible with any aircraft that has 30-inch lugs,” using the common BRU-32 heavy-duty ejector rack. It is also capable of sub-surface launches from a submarine's vertical launch system.

Lockheed Martin has explored the missile's compatibility with various aircraft types, including electronic and physical fit-checking, on the F/A-18E/F Super Hornet, EA-18G Growler, F-16, F-15, as well as all three versions of the F-35 Lightning II, among others. In particular, the F-35A/C and F-22 can carry the missile inside internal weapons bays, while other aircraft like the F-35B would have to carry it on external pylons. According to Lockheed Martin, an F-35A or C could carry six Makos between internal and external bays. The P-8A Poseidon, known for maritime patrol and surveillance, has received fit-checking and could also adapt the Mako for offensive missions. According to Naval News, the missile is fitted with multiple types of guidance system, and it is expected to be able to engage many, if not all, of the same targets as the SiAW as well as maritime targets. Mako uses a conventional solid-fueled rocket motor as a cost-saving measure, eschewing more exotic hypersonic propulsion systems. This is expected to reduce costs, which analysts have noted is particularly important in potential confrontations with major powers like China and Russia, where its hypersonic speed is crucial for stand-off engagements of time-sensitive targets such as mobile air defenses and ballistic missile systems, which are integral components of anti-access/area denial (A2/AD) strategies employed by these nations.

Lockheed Martin has expressed interest in exporting the Mako to other nations "interested in acquiring hypersonic capability." At the Farnborough International Airshow in England, on 25 July 2024, Lockheed Martin proposed opening its first Mako production facility in the UK to produce missiles for the RAF's Eurofighter Typhoons.

== See also ==
- Hypersonic Attack Cruise Missile
- Hypersonic Advanced Weapon Concept
- Harpoon (missile)
