= OpFires =

Hypersonic glide vehicle medium-range ballistic missile

Operational Fires (OpFires)
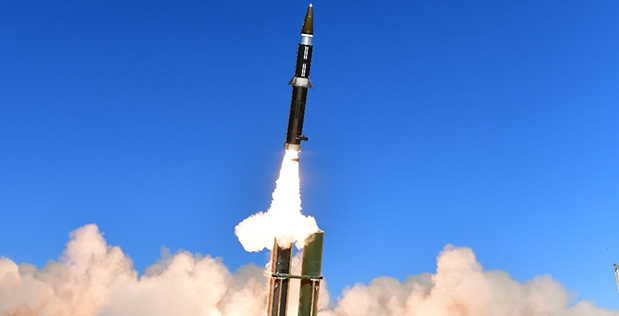
- OpFires successfully executed its first flight test in July 2022
- Type: Hypersonic glide vehicle medium-range ballistic missile
- Place of origin: United States

Service history
- In service: Experimental program which concluded in FY2022
- Used by: United States

Production history
- Designer: DARPA

Specifications
- Engine: rocket motor
- Operational range: 1000 miles (1609 kilometers)
- Maximum speed: hypersonic
- Launch platform: specialized pallet for Palletized Load System

Operational Fires (abbreviated as OpFires) is a hypersonic ground-launched system developed by DARPA for the United States Armed Forces. The system deploys a boost glide vehicle. The prime contractor for the program is Lockheed Martin. The missile's range is thought to be up to 1,000 miles (1,609 kilometers).

OpFires intended to produce a medium-range hypersonic missile that costs less and with less range than the Long-Range Hypersonic Weapon (LRHW) to strike larger numbers of targets at operational ranges. It will reuse the glide body from the AGM-183 ARRW. The unique aspect of OpFires is use of a "throttleable" rocket motor, where thrust can be turned off at a desired point mid-flight instead of needing to wait until all fuel is burned to make it better able to hit a short-range target.

== History ==
The system was successfully tested in July 2022 from a Palletized Load System-based launcher vehicle at White Sands Missile Range. The system achieved all test objectives, including first ever use of a U.S. Marine Corps (USMC) logistics truck as a medium-range missile launcher, missile canister egress, stable flight capture, and use of U.S. Army inventory artillery fire control systems to initiate the test mission. Lockheed Martin built the system, which includes a Northrop Grumman rocket motor, and conducted the test.

== See also ==
- Pershing II (similar range)
- Long-Range Hypersonic Weapon
- AGM-183 ARRW
- Hypersonic Air-breathing Weapon Concept
