= SCIFiRE =

American-Australian missile project

SCIFIRE, or the Southern Cross Integrated Flight Research Experiment, is an American-Australian military technology partnership that is developing a solid-rocket-boosted, air-breathing, hypersonic conventionally-armed cruise missile that can be launched by existing fighter or bomber aircraft. The missile, known as Hypersonic Attack Cruise Missile (HACM), will be built by Raytheon and powered by a Northrop Grumman scramjet.

== History ==
The project is led by the United States Department of Defense and the Australian Department of Defence. The United States Air Force, United States Navy, the Royal Australian Air Force Headquarters, and the Australian Defence Science and Technology Group are working with contractors Boeing, Lockheed Martin, Northrop Grumman, and Raytheon Technologies.

The project is an "outgrowth" of the 2007-initiated HIFiRE project, which involved the same partners and explored scramjet engine technology and tested the flight dynamics of a Mach-8 hypersonic glide vehicle. SCIFiRE officially commenced in November 2020. The missile will be capable of Mach 5 speed and will be suitable for launching from an F/A-18F Super Hornet, EA-18G Growler, F-35A Lightning II, or a P-8A Poseidon maritime surveillance aircraft. Flight testing was expected to occur at the RAAF Woomera Range Complex in South Australia.

As of 2021, the missile was expected to enter service within 5 to 10 years. The Australian Government considers the missile to be a potential deterrent to would-be aggressors in the Pacific region.

The tactical-range Hypersonic Attack Cruise Missile (HACM) will be built by Raytheon Technologies and will use a Northrop Grumman scramjet.

In March 2026, joint USAF-RAAF testing of HACM was revealed to have been conducted at RAAF Woomera Range Complex under the auspices of the SCIFiRE agreement.
