= AGM-88J SiAW =

U.S. Air Force air-to-surface missile

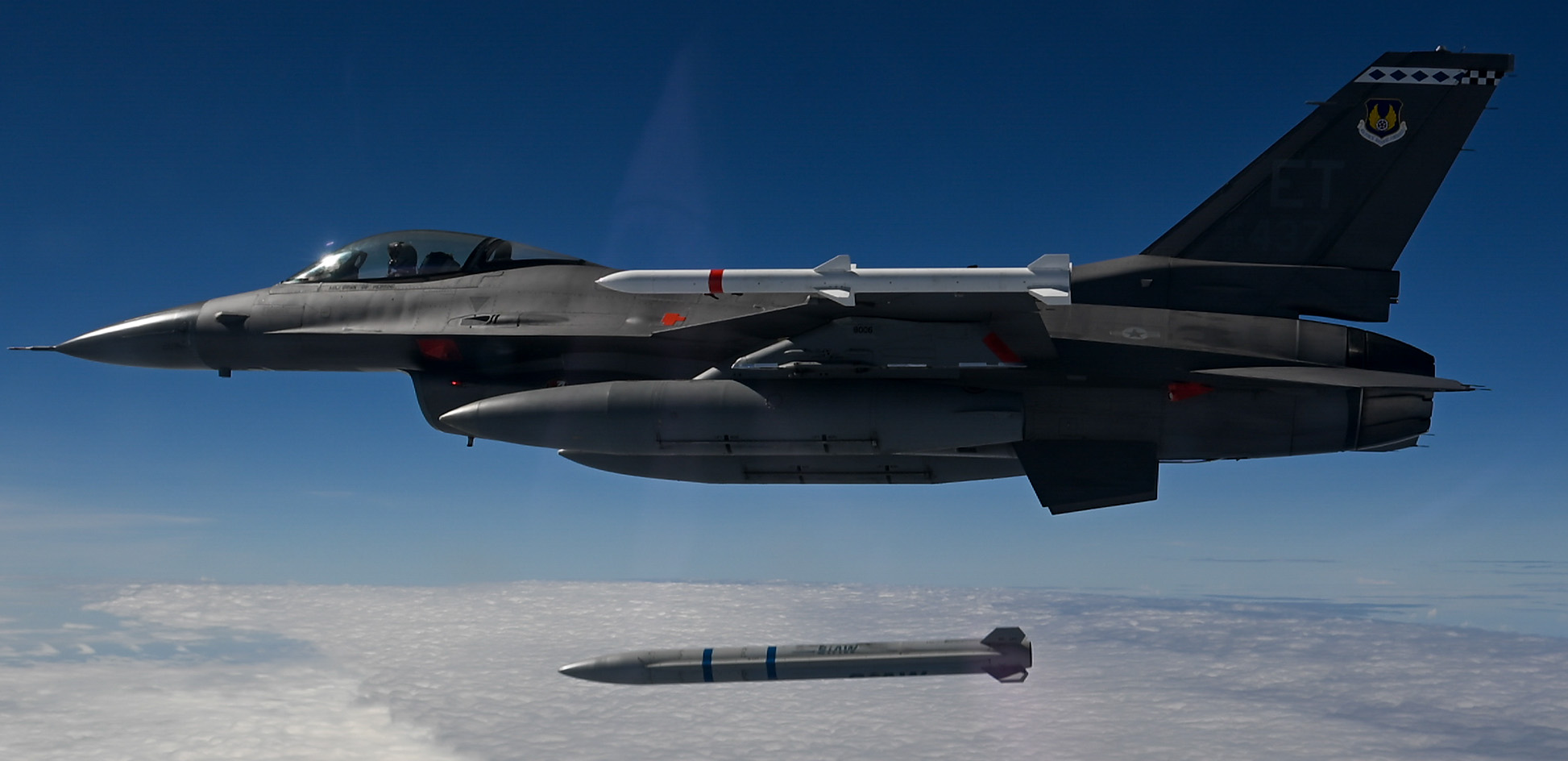
- An AGM-88J SiAW being tested by a United States Air Force F-16
- Type: Air-to-surface missile, aimed at targeting anti-access / area denial (A2 / AD) weapons
- Place of origin: United States

Service history
- In service: Planned for 2026
- Used by: To be used by the United States Air Force

Production history
- Designer: Northrop Grumman
- Designed: Since May 2022
- Manufacturer: Northrop Grumman
- Developed from: AGM-88G AARGM-ER
- Produced: Since 2024
- Variants

Specifications
- Steering system: Tail controlled missile
- Launch platform: Developed with: F-16; To be introduced with: F-35A; Planned to be used with: F-15E, F-15EX, F-47, B-21

The AGM-88J SiAW (Stand-in Attack Weapon) is a tactical air-to-surface missile under development for the United States Air Force (USAF) by Northrop Grumman.

It is primarily designed to attack air-defences and high-value targets such as command-and-control sites, surface-to-surface missile launchers, anti-satellite systems, and GPS jamming systems.

== History ==
In May 2022, the USAF awarded contracts to L3Harris Technologies, Lockheed Martin and Northrop Grumman to begin the first phase of development for the Stand-in Attack Weapon (SiAW). On 28 September 2023, the USAF awarded a US$705 million contract to Northrop Grumman to develop and test the SiAW. The SiAW is intended to attack relocatable targets including theater ballistic missile launchers, cruise and anti-ship missile launchers, GPS jamming platforms and anti-satellite systems. It will have a shorter range than standoff weapons, being fired by an aircraft after penetrating enemy airspace. The SiAW will fit inside the F-35 Lightning II's internal weapon bays. The design leverages work on the United States Navy's AGM-88G Advanced Anti-Radiation Guided Missile – Extended Range (AARGM-ER). The USAF plans to have an operational weapon by 2026.

In November 2024, Northrop Grumman delivered the first SiAW to the USAF for flight testing.

== See also ==
- Mako Multi-Mission Hypersonic Missile, Lockheed Martin's offering for the SiAW program
