= AGM-183 ARRW =

U.S. Air Force prototype missile

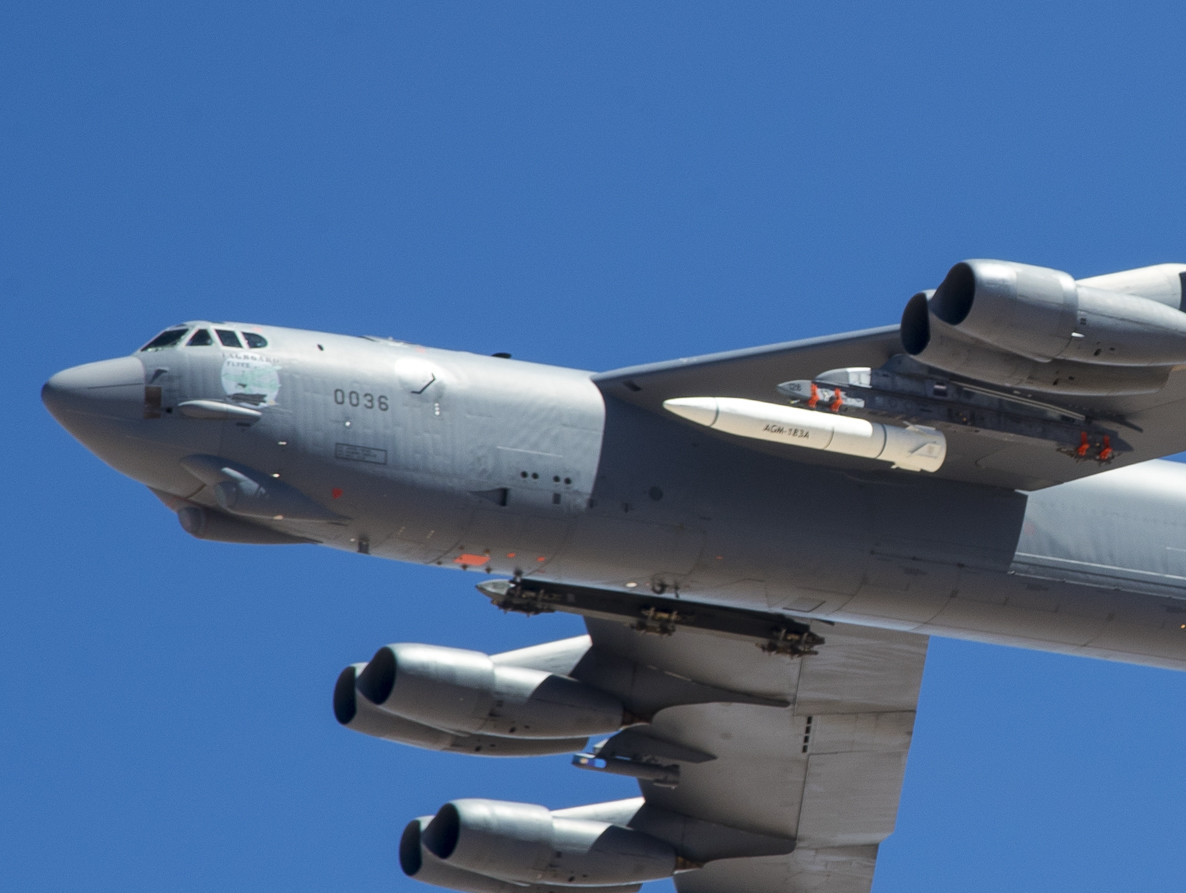
- A prototype AGM-183A is pictured carried by a U.S. Air Force B-52 in a June 2019 test.
- Type: Air-launched ballistic missile with hypersonic glide vehicle
- Place of origin: United States

Service history
- Used by: United States Air Force (planned)

Production history
- Manufacturer: Lockheed Martin
- Unit cost: $15-$18 million

Specifications
- Mass: 6,600 lb (3,000 kg)
- Length: 22 ft (6.7 m)
- Operational range: 1,000 mi (1,600 km)
- Maximum speed: Mach 7+ (planned)
- Launch platform: B-52 (tested); B-1B/F-15E (planned)

The AGM-183 ARRW ("Air-Launched Rapid Response Weapon"; pronounced Arrow) is a hypersonic air-to-ground ballistic missile planned for use by the United States Air Force. Developed by Lockheed Martin, the boost-glide vehicle is propelled to a maximum speed of more than Mach 5 by a rocket motor before gliding toward its target. The program was initially cancelled in March 2023 after multiple failed tests and despite multiple announced cancellations and resumptions of development, development has quietly continued and in 2025 the Air Force announced plans to fund ARRW in FY 2026, with the intent to begin procurement. In 2026, the Air Force announced that its FY 27 budget would include funding for an Increment 2 variant of ARRW with undisclosed enhanced capabilities. Simultaneously, they announced plans for life-extension modifications to the Boeing B-52 Stratofortress bomber, developing it as a "standoff" strike weapon, fitting it with external pylons capable of carrying up to 6 AGM-183 missiles per aircraft.

== History ==
=== Development and acquisition ===
In August 2018, the U.S. Air Force awarded a $480 million contract to Lockheed Martin for the development of an air-launched hypersonic weapon. The resulting missile, the AGM-183A ARRW ("Arrow"), underwent an initial captive carry flight test aboard a U.S. Air Force B-52 in June 2019.

In February 2020, the Trump Administration proposed a 23% increase in funding for hypersonic weapons, and the same month, the U.S. Air Force announced it had decided to move forward with acquisition of the AGM-183A.

In March 2020, Under Secretary of Defense for Research and Engineering Michael D. Griffin stated that the United States was "close at hand" to having a hypersonic boost-glide weapon ready to field.

In early 2023, the Congressional Budget Office (CBO) estimated that a production run of 300 ARRWs would have a unit cost of $14.9 million per missile and a program cost of $5.3 billion including platform integration and 20 years of sustainment. For a production run of 100, each unit would cost $18 million with a program cost of $2.2 billion.

On March 29, 2023, Assistant Secretary of the Air Force for Acquisition, Technology and Logistics, Andrew Hunter told the House Tactical Air and Land Forces Subcommittee, a committee responsible for providing oversight for military ammunition, acquisition, and aviation programs, that the AGM-183A program would not proceed, although the ARRW program's last two all-up round test flights would proceed in order to collect data to help with future hypersonic programs. In the Fiscal Year 2025 budget, released March 11, 2024, no funding was provided for procurement or further research and development of the AGM-183, at the time seemingly effectively ending the project. The prototype stage of the program was declared completed in 2024.

However, in 2025, the Air Force announced that it intended to revive the shelved AGM-183A hypersonic program and move it into the procurement phase. Air Force Chief of Staff Gen. David Allvin announced in a June 2025 congressional hearing that the Air Force wants to include funding for both ARRW and the Hypersonic Attack Cruise Missile (HACM), in the FY 2026 budget, citing the need to catch up to Chinese and Russian hypersonic operational capabilities. Acquisition funds were procured for the program in the FY 2026 budget, while the FY 2027 budget includes funding for an Increment 2 variant of ARRW with undisclosed enhanced capabilities and plans on doubling production rates for ARRW, with a planned investment of $1.8 billion across the FYDP between both ARRW and HACM. The FY 27 budget simultaneously procured funding for $342 million to modernize the remaining B-1B fleet, which will carry the ARRW both as a hypersonic test platform and operationally.

=== Theorized relation to the "Super-Duper Missile" ===
A "Super-Duper [sic] Missile" was announced by US President Donald Trump during a press availability in the Oval Office on May 15, 2020. According to Trump, the weapon is 17 times faster than existing missiles in the United States arsenal; however, Kingston Reif of the Arms Control Association believes the claim may have been a misstatement. PBS news correspondent Nick Schifrin has theorized that the "Super-Duper Missile" is the AGM-183A, as has the China Times.

== Design and Performance ==
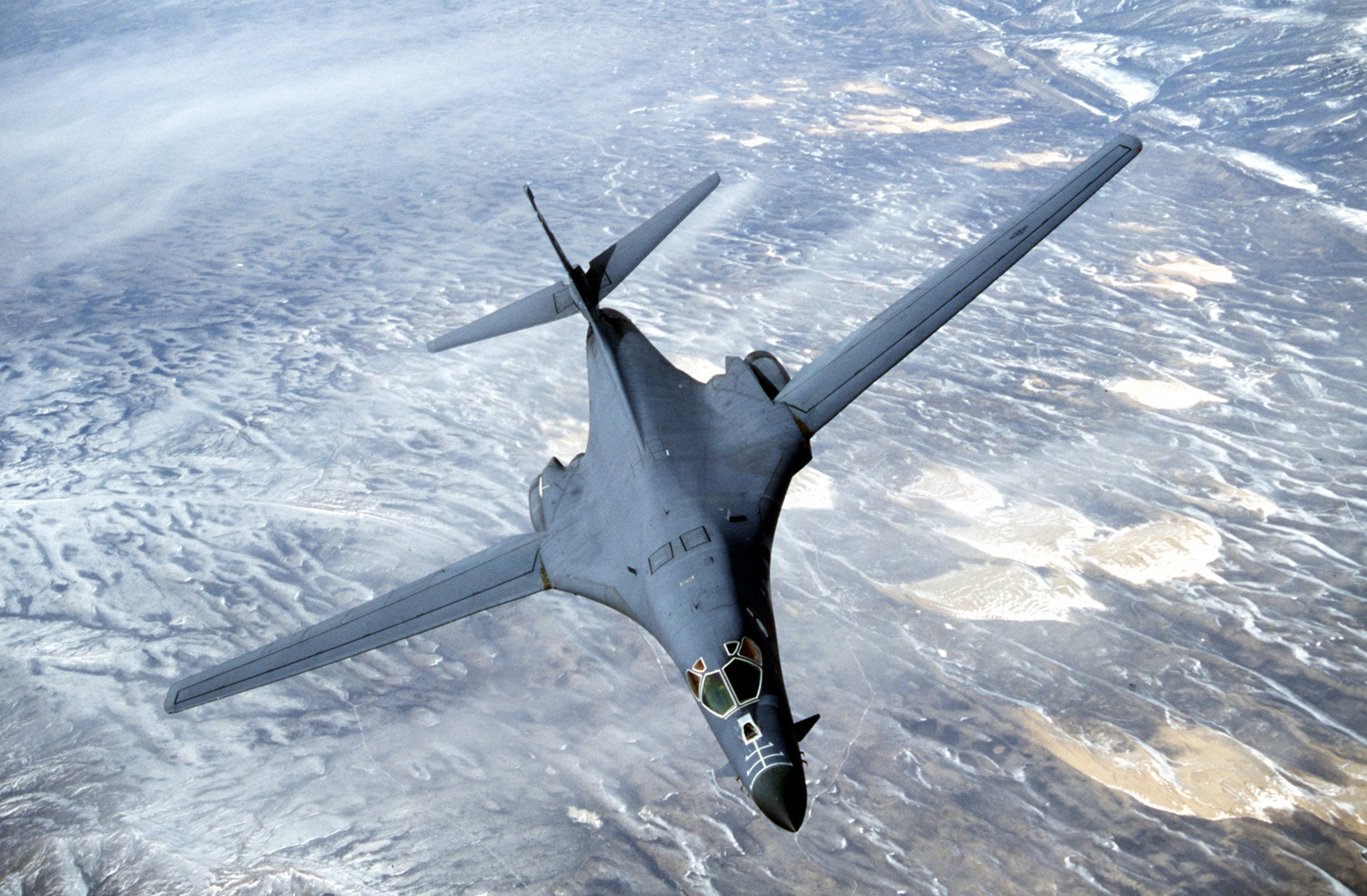
The B-1B was being considered as a platform for the AGM-183.

The AGM-183A had a claimed maximum speed of more than 15,000 miles per hour (24,000 km/h; Mach 20).

The weapon used a boost-glide system, in which it was propelled to hypersonic speed by a rocket on which it was mounted before gliding toward a target. According to Air Force Global Strike Commander General Timothy Ray, the U.S. Air Force was, as of April 2020, considering using the remaining fleet of B-1B bombers as AGM-183A firing platforms, with each aircraft carrying up to 31 hypersonic weapons (between ARRW and HAWC) mounted on the Common Strategic Rotary Launcher and on external pylons.

=== Testing ===
A booster flight test of ARRW took place in April 2021 at Point Mugu Sea Range, off the coast of Southern California but did not launch successfully; this was the eighth test for ARRW.

Another test in May 2021 for the ARRW's avionics, sensors and communications systems, was successful. The test did not use any of the ARRW's systems but instead used a B-52 based system. On a flight to Alaska from Barksdale Air Force Base in Louisiana, the B-52 was able to receive target data from over 1,000 nautical miles (1,900 km) away.

In July 2021, a second flight test at Point Mugu Sea Range, again being dropped from a B-52 bomber, was a failure as the solid rocket motor failed to ignite. On December 15, 2021, the third flight test failed to launch as well. On March 9, 2022, Congress halved funding for ARRW and transferred the balance to ARRW's R&D account to allow for further testing, which puts the procurement contract at risk.

On May 14, 2022, the 419th Flight Test Squadron and the Global Power Bomber Combined Test Force at Edwards Air Force Base conducted the first successful test of the ARRW off the coast of Southern California. The weapon demonstrated separation from the B-52H Stratofortress. Its booster ignited and burned for the expected duration, and the weapon was able to achieve speeds greater than Mach 5 (6,100 km/h; 3,800 mph).

The USAF conducted another successful test of the missile on July 12, 2022.

The USAF completed the first All-Up-Round (AUR) test on December 9, 2022. This test included both the booster and hypersonic glide vehicle. The USAF 412th Test Wing used a B-52H Stratofortress, at Edwards Air Force Base. Test was deemed a success, test range sensors malfunctioned, preventing the Air Force from fully knowing whether the glide vehicle and warhead performed as intended in the terminal flight phase.

On March 13, 2023, the United States Air Force conducted a hypersonic test-launch of an operational AGM-183A prototype from a Boeing B-52H Stratofortress by the 412th Test Wing located at Edwards Air Force Base in California. Air Force Secretary Frank Kendall said the test had failed.

On August 19, 2023, the Air Force conducted another test of the ARRW, and said it had "gained valuable new insights into the capabilities" of ARRW.

On October 12, 2023, the Air Force conducted another test of the ARRW, and said it had "gained valuable new insights into the capabilities of this new, cutting-edge technology".

On November 15, 2023, Lockheed Martin announced that the program was at a point where the company and its suppliers were ready for low-rate manufacture following breakthroughs in development.

On February 28, 2024, Andersen Air Force Base released pictures of a live AGM-183A carried by a B-52 bomber as part of a training event.

On March 17, 2024, the USAF conducted its final planned end-to-end test launch of the AGM-183A, successfully launching one out of a B-52 bomber taking off from Andersen Air Force Base. According to a USAF statement issued on March 20. "The Air Force gained valuable insights into the capabilities of this technology," the statement added without giving further details, including whether the test was deemed a success.

== See also ==
- Hypersonic Attack Cruise Missile – Australian-American air-launched hypersonic cruise missile
- ASN4G - French nuclear capable air-launched cruise missile
- KD-21 - Chinese air-launched ballistic missile
- Kh-47M2 Kinzhal – Russian nuclear-capable air-launched ballistic missile
- ROCKS - Israeli air-launched ballistic missile
