= Hypersonic weapon =

High-speed missiles and projectiles

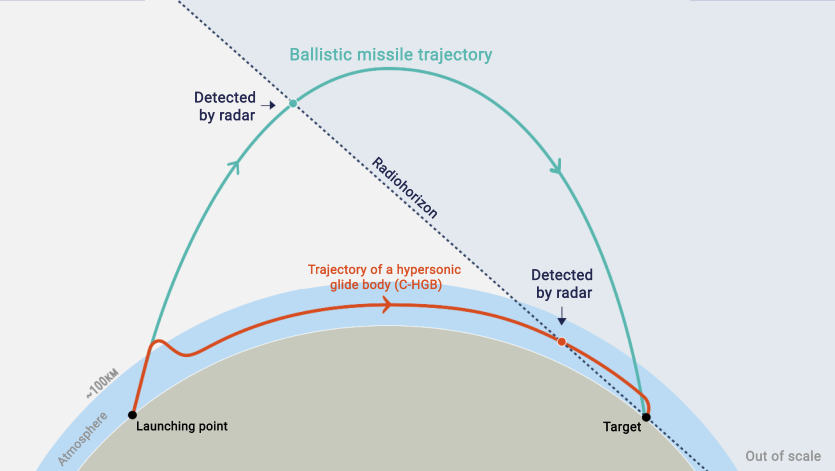
Comparison of ballistic missile and hypersonic glide vehicle flight trajectories

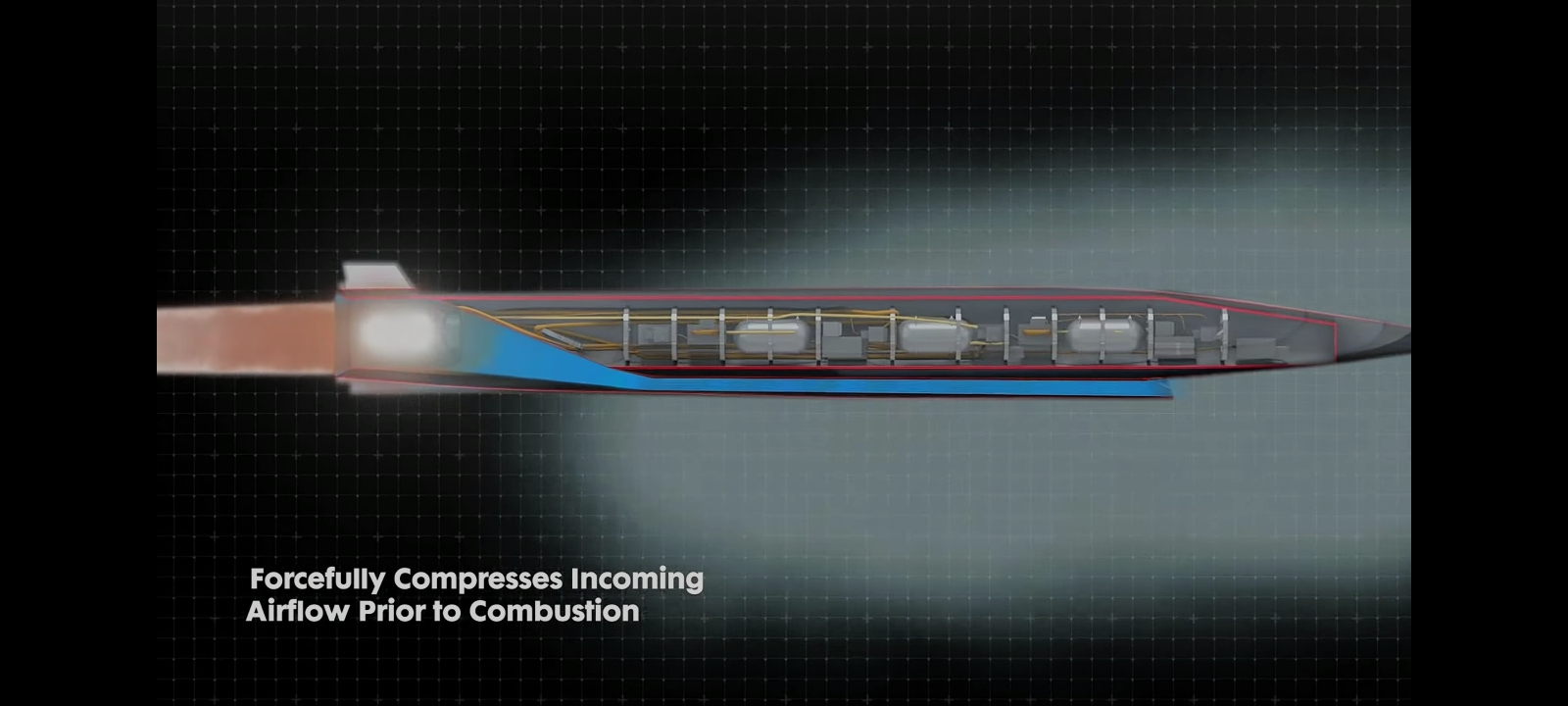
Scramjet-powered hypersonic cruise missile

A hypersonic weapon is a weapon that can travel and make significant sustained maneuvers during atmospheric flight at hypersonic speed, which is defined as above Mach 5 (five times the speed of sound). These typically fall into two main categories: hypersonic glide vehicles (boost-glide weapons), and hypersonic cruise missiles (airbreathing weapons).

Below Mach 1, weapons would be characterized as subsonic, and above Mach 1, as supersonic. At extremely high speeds, air in the shock wave is ionized into a plasma, which makes control and communication difficult.

== Categorization ==
There are two main categories of hypersonic weapon:

1. Boost-glide hypersonic weapons, which glide and maneuver at hypersonic speeds following boosting by rocket propulsion. Typical examples are ballistic missiles fitted with hypersonic glide vehicle warheads.
2. Airbreathing hypersonic weapons, typically hypersonic cruise missiles which maintain hypersonic speed by engines such as scramjets.

Gun-launched weapons, projectiles fired from either a conventional artillery or prospective railguns may also be considered a type of hypersonic weapon, though they are less common than the two main types.

Existing weapon systems such as ballistic missiles already travel at hypersonic speeds (and may actually reach their target sooner when on depressed trajectories) but are not typically classified as hypersonic weapons due to lacking the use of aerodynamic lift to allow their reentry vehicles to maneuver under guided flight within the atmosphere. Maneuverable reentry vehicles, such as employed on the Pershing II, Fattah-1 and DF-21D, are generally excluded from this definition as they maneuver aerodynamically only for short periods of time during the terminal phase, and lack the significant cross-range maneuverability expected from hypersonic weapons. Additionally, air-to-air missiles can temporarily reach hypersonic speeds in certain atmospheric envelopes and launch regimes, but generally are not considered as hypersonic weapons as they do not conduct significant maneuvers at these speeds nor have the ability to evade anti-missile defenses.

== History ==
The Silbervogel was the first design for a hypersonic weapon and was developed by German scientists in the 1930s, but was never constructed.

The ASALM (Advanced Strategic Air-Launched Missile) was a medium-range strategic missile program developed in the late 1970s for the United States Air Force; the missile's development reached the stage of propulsion-system testing, test-flown to Mach 5.5 before being cancelled in 1980.

In the 2022 Russian invasion of Ukraine, Russia was seen to have fielded operational weapons and used them for combat. The Kremlin presents new hypersonic weapons as supposedly capable of overcoming "any" foreign missile defense systems, with the "pre-nuclear deterrence" concept contained in its 2014 iteration of the official Russian Military Doctrine. A volley of Russian hypersonic missiles were launched at Kyiv in January 2023.

== Hypersonic weapon examples ==
Selected examples of hypersonic weapons programs:

=== China ===
- DF-17/DF-ZF - hypersonic glide vehicle / ballistic missile
- DF-27 - hypersonic glide vehicle / ballistic missile
- YJ-17 - hypersonic boost-glide waverider / ballistic missile
- YJ-19 - hypersonic scramjet cruise missile
- CJ-1000 - hypersonic scramjet cruise missile
- YKJ-1000 - Cheap hypersonic missile.

=== France ===
- ASN4G hypersonic air-launched cruise missile (under development; technological work on the missile began in the early 1990s and scheduled to succeed the ASMP in the pre-strategic deterrence role in 2035)
- VMaX hypersonic glide vehicle (under development by ArianeGroup; first flight test took place on June 26, 2023, from the DGA's site in Biscarrosse and was successful)

=== India ===
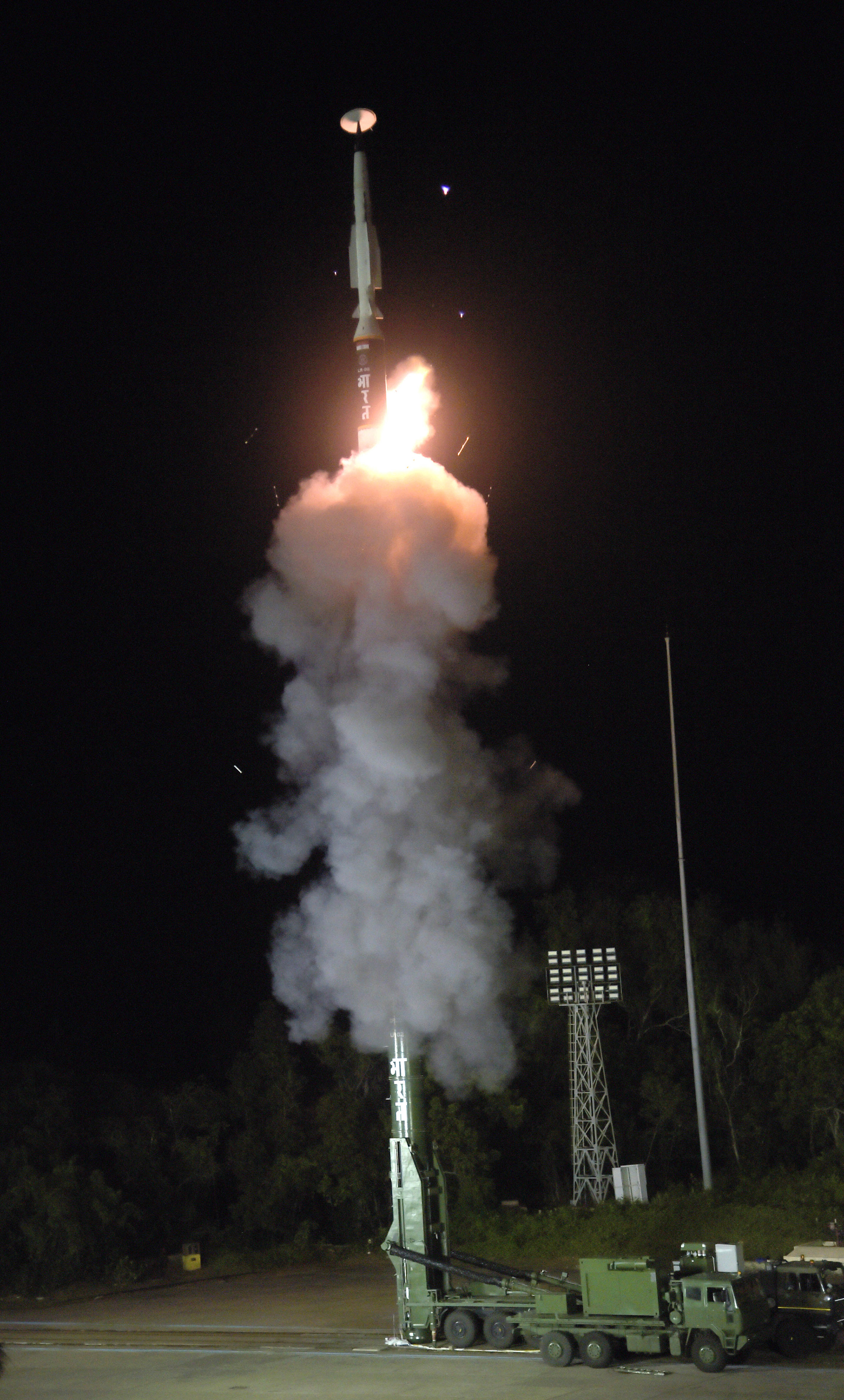
The second firing trial of India's LRAShM

- BM-04
- BrahMos-II
- DRDO HSTDV
- ET-LDHCM
- LRAShM

=== Iran ===
- Fattah-1
- Fattah-2

=== Japan ===
- Hyper Velocity Gliding Projectile

=== North Korea ===
- Hwasong-8 - HGV
- Hwasong-11E - HGV
- Hwasong-12B (unconfirmed) - HGV
- Hwasong-16B - HGV

=== Russia ===
- 3M22 Zircon - often claimed as a hypersonic scramjet cruise missile, but evidence shows that it's probably a quasi-ballistic missile
- Avangard (hypersonic glide vehicle)

=== United States ===
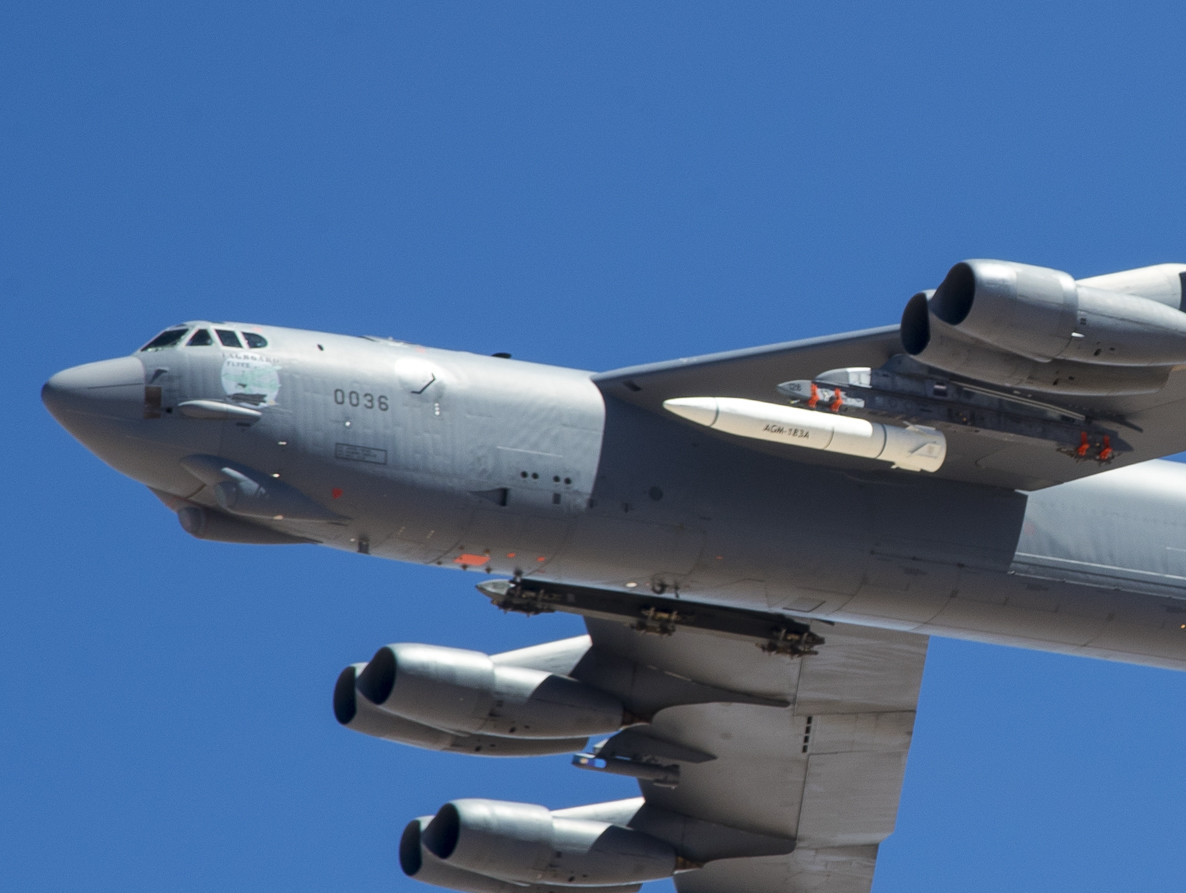
An Air-Launched Rapid Response Weapon (ARRW) carried by a B-52 bomber

- DARPA Hypersonic Air-breathing Weapon Concept (HAWC) hypersonic scramjet cruise missile
- Hypersonic Attack Cruise Missile (Air Force) in partnership with Australia
- Long-Range Hypersonic Weapon (Army) and Conventional Prompt Strike (Navy) boost-glide system, both use the same Common-Hypersonic Glide Body HGV
- OpFires (DARPA) - hypersonic glide vehicle using body from AGM-183 ARRW
- Lockheed Martin Mako (unknown flight profile)
- Blackbeard

== See also ==
- Hypersonic flight
- Scramjet programs
