= ASN4G =

French air-launched nuclear-armed hypersonic cruise missile

Air-Sol Nucléaire de 4ème Génération (ASN4G)
- Type: Air-launched cruise missile Hypersonic weapon
- Place of origin: France

Service history
- In service: 2035 (expected)
- Used by: French Air Force; French Navy

Production history
- Designer: MBDA France

Specifications
- Warhead: TNA4G
- Operational range: > 1,000 km (620 mi)

The ASN4G (Air-Sol Nucléaire de 4ème Génération) is a French nuclear-armed, scramjet-powered, air-launched hypersonic cruise missile under development by MBDA France, assisted by the ONERA. It is intended to succeed the ASMP in the pre-strategic deterrence role from 2035 onwards.

== Overview ==
Technological work on this successor began in the early 1990s and the programme's existence was officially confirmed in 2014 by French defense minister, Jean-Yves Le Drian. The ASN4G project aims to replace the ASMP missile, the cornerstone of the French nuclear deterrent's aerial component, drawing on cutting-edge technologies. Two preliminary study programs had been launched: "Camosis", which focused on stealth; and "Prométhée", focusing on hypersonic speed, with studies on a hybrid ramjet (performing subsonic, supersonic, and then hypersonic combustion in succession). Ultimately, the chosen option was a Mach 7-8 hypersonic missile capable of complex maneuvers, designed to counter enemy defenses in the context of increasing and ever more sophisticated anti-access/area denial means. The new missile is expected to have more than twice the range of the ASMPA-R, the latest iteration of the ASMP, thus significantly above 1,000 kilometres (600 mi).

The ASN4G is due for integration on the Rafale F5 fighter under development and its successor, the Avion de Combat du Futur (ACF).

== Development ==
In 2024, the French defence procurement agency, DGA, awarded the "MIHYSYS" contract to the ONERA and MBDA France. It was meant to enable "the continued improvement of knowledge, forecasting methods, and technological building blocks—including alternatives—for the combustion chambers of supersonic and hypersonic air-breathing propulsion systems". This programme focused, in particular, on developing new capabilities and models for the numerical simulation of combustion chambers using the CEDRE computational code (multiphysics simulation software for energy and propulsion), as well as on developing quantum computing capabilities for fluid mechanics and energy.

On March 18, 2025, French President Emmanuel Macron announced that the 116th Luxeuil-Saint Sauveur Air Base would be the first French base to be equipped with the hypersonic missile.

In June 2026, the Ministry of Armed Forces disclosed the development contract for the ASN4G had officially been notified to MBDA France on 2 June, with entry into service planned around 2035 on the Rafale F5.

== See also ==
- BrahMos-II - Hypersonic scramjet-propelled missile under development by India and Russia
- Hypersonic Attack Cruise Missile – Hypersonic air-launched cruise missile under development by the United States and Australia
