= AHM-4 HACM =

Australian-American air-launched hypersonic cruise missile

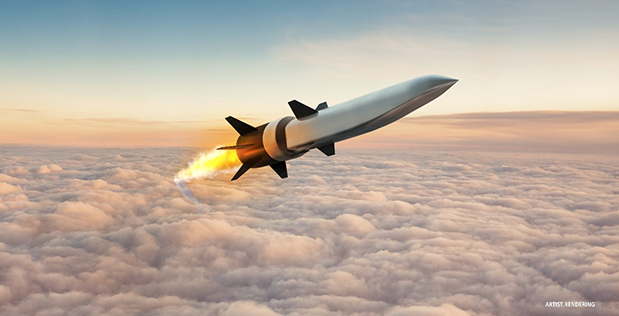
- HAWC missile render, the preceding program for HACM
- Type: Hypersonic air-launched cruise missile
- Place of origin: United States; Australia

Service history
- In service: In development; in service from FY2027
- Used by: United States Air Force; Royal Australian Air Force

Production history
- Designer: RTX Corporation; Northrop Grumman

Specifications
- Engine: Scramjet
- Operational range: 1,000 nmi (1,900 km)
- Maximum speed: Mach 8 (2.7 km/s; 9,800 km/h; 6,100 mph)
- Launch platform: In American Service: F-15E Strike Eagle; In Australian service: F/A-18F Super Hornet; EA-18G Growler; F-35A Lightning II; P-8A Poseidon

The AHM-4 Hypersonic Attack Cruise Missile (HACM; pronounced Hack-em) is an Australian-American scramjet-powered hypersonic air-launched cruise missile project, the successor of the Hypersonic Air-breathing Weapon Concept (HAWC) and the SCIFiRE hypersonic programs.

Technology developed for the HAWC demonstrator was used to influence the design of the HACM, a U.S. Air Force Program of Record to create a scramjet-powered hypersonic missile it could deploy as an operational weapon.

In Australian service, the projectile will become the fastest missile Australia has ever operated, and the first hypersonic missile.

== Development ==
In December 2021, Raytheon Technologies was awarded a $985 million contract to continue its HACM development.

The contract to develop HACM further was awarded to Raytheon in September 2022. HACM will use a Northrop Grumman scramjet. It is designed to be smaller than the AGM-183 ARRW and able to fly along “vastly different trajectories” than the boost-glide ARRW.

The system will give the US military "tactical flexibility to employ fighters to hold high-value, time-sensitive targets at risk, while maintaining bombers for other strategic targets." Following the U.S. Air Force's decision to not pursue procurement of ARRW in March 2023, the HACM became the service's only hypersonic weapon program. Though the USAF confirmed that they would not be purchasing any hypersonic weapons in FY 2024, the budget request for the upcoming fiscal year includes $380 million for R&D on the HACM, followed by a proposed $517 million in FY 2025. The United States hopes to have the missile in operational capacity by FY 2027. The weapon was designated the AHM-4 in April 2025.

The United States Air Force has stated that Australian testing facilities will be used for testing of HACM.

In Australian service, the projectile will become the fastest missile Australia has ever operated, and the first hypersonic missile in the Oceania region.

In June 2025, it was revealed that the program was behind schedule, and the number of tests before entering service would be limited. Prior to this announcement, it had been reported that the missile was actually ahead of schedule. The program falling behind schedule was due to the programs major design review slipping from early 2024 to September 2024, this tightened the testing schedule to only 5 test flights before the planned rapid fielding decision in FY2027.

== Testing ==
- September-October 2026: First release flight test was conducted jointly by the USAF and RAAF from a RAAF F/A-18F Super Hornet in an unnamed range in Australia.

== Future Operators ==
United States
- United States Air Force
  - F-15E Strike Eagle
Australia
- Royal Australian Air Force
  - F/A-18F Super Hornet
  - F-35A Lightning II
  - EA-18G Growler
  - P-8A Poseidon

== See also ==
- Hypersonic Air Launched Offensive Anti-Surface
- 3M22 Zircon
- ASALM
- Kh-90
- ASN4G
