= Hypersonic Air-breathing Weapon Concept =

U.S. scramjet missile project

Hypersonic Air-breathing Weapon Concept (HAWC)
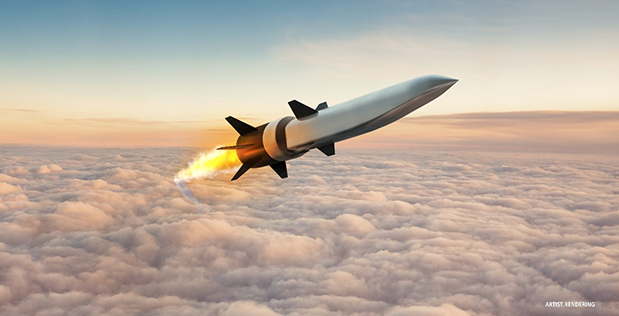
- HAWC Missile Concept Drawing
- Type: Hypersonic air-launched cruise missile
- Place of origin: United States

Service history
- In service: In development
- Used by: United States

Production history
- Designer: DARPA

Specifications
- Warhead: None (uses its own kinetic energy upon impact to destroy the target, see Kinetic energy weapon)
- Engine: Scramjet
- Operational range: >300 nmi (350 miles; 560 km)
- Flight altitude: >60,000 ft (11 mi; 18 km)
- Maximum speed: >Mach 5 (3,800 mph; 6,100 km/h)
- Launch platform: B-52 Stratofortress

The Hypersonic Air-breathing Weapon Concept (HAWC, pronounced "hawk") is a scramjet powered hypersonic air-launched cruise missile project at the U.S. Defense Advanced Research Projects Agency (DARPA), that had a successful hypersonic flight announced in September 2021. It is a kinetic energy weapon, without an explosive warhead.

The scramjet propelled the missile at "a speed greater than Mach 5" (about 3,300 miles per hour).

The first successful flight was in September 2021. Further testing was carried out in mid-March 2022, but was kept secret at the time to avoid the impression of escalation against Russia during the Russian invasion of Ukraine. The existence of the test was revealed in early April 2022.

Principal Director for Hypersonics Mike White stated that HAWC would be smaller than hypersonic glide vehicles and could therefore launch from a wider range of platforms. White additionally noted that HAWC could integrate seekers more easily. DARPA requested $60 million for MoHAWC, the successor program to HAWC, in FY2023.

On 18 July 2022, the third successful flight test of the HAWC was done by DARPA - the missile was able to fly at (3,300 mph; 5,300 km/h) speed at the altitude of more than 60,000 ft (11 mi; 18 km) for more than 300 nautical miles (350 miles; 560 km).

On 30 January 2023, the final successful flight test of the HAWC was reported by DARPA and Lockheed Martin - like its previous flight test, the missile was able to fly at (3,300 mph; 5,300 km/h ) speed at the altitude of more than 60,000 ft (11 mi; 18 km) for more than 300 nautical miles (350 miles; 560 km), and demonstrated improved performances and capabilities. DARPA plans to further these technological improvements through More Opportunities with HAWC program (MOHAWC).

Technology developed for the HAWC demonstrator was used to influence the design of the Hypersonic Attack Cruise Missile (HACM), a U.S. Air Force Program of Record to create a scramjet-powered hypersonic missile it could deploy as an operational weapon. The contract to develop HACM further was awarded to Raytheon in September 2022. HACM will use a Northrop Grumman scramjet.
